= Wilfrid Voynich =

Polish revolutionary, antiquarian and bibliophile (1865–1930)

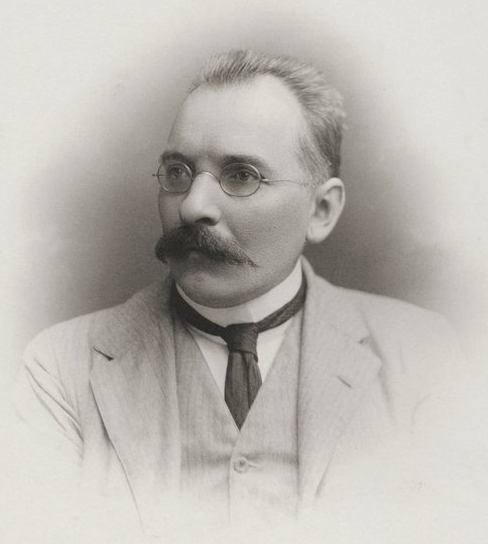
- Voynich c. 1920
- Born: Michał Habdank-Wojnicz; 12 November 1865; Telšiai, Russian Empire (now Lithuania)
- Died: 19 March 1930 (aged 64); New York City, U.S.
- Occupations: Revolutionary; antiquarian book dealer
- Known for: Discovery of the Voynich manuscript
- Spouses: Ethel Lilian Boole; (1902–1930, his death)

Wilfrid Voynich ([ˈvɔjɲitʂ], VOY-nitch; born Michał Habdank-Wojnicz; 12 November [O.S. 31 October] 1865 – 19 March 1930) was a Polish revolutionary, antiquarian and bibliophile. Voynich operated one of the largest rare book businesses in the world. He is remembered as the eponym of the Voynich manuscript.

== Life ==
Michał Habdank-Wojnicz was born in the town of Telšiai in present-day Lithuania, then part of the Russian Empire, into a Polish noble family. The "Habdank" part of his surname is the name of a Polish heraldic clan. He was the son of a Polish petty official (titular counsellor).

He attended a gimnazjum in Suwałki (a town in northeastern Poland), then studied at the university of Warsaw, St. Petersburg, and Moscow. He graduated from Moscow University in chemistry and became a licensed pharmacist.

In 1885, in Warsaw, Wojnicz joined Ludwik Waryński's revolutionary organization, Proletariat. In 1886, after a failed attempt to free fellow-conspirators Piotr Bardowski (1846–1886) and Stanisław Kunicki (1861–1886), who had both been sentenced to death, from the Warsaw Citadel, he was arrested by the Russian police. In 1887, he was sent to penal servitude at Tunka near Irkutsk in Siberia.

Whilst in Siberia, Voynich acquired a working knowledge of eighteen different languages, albeit not well.

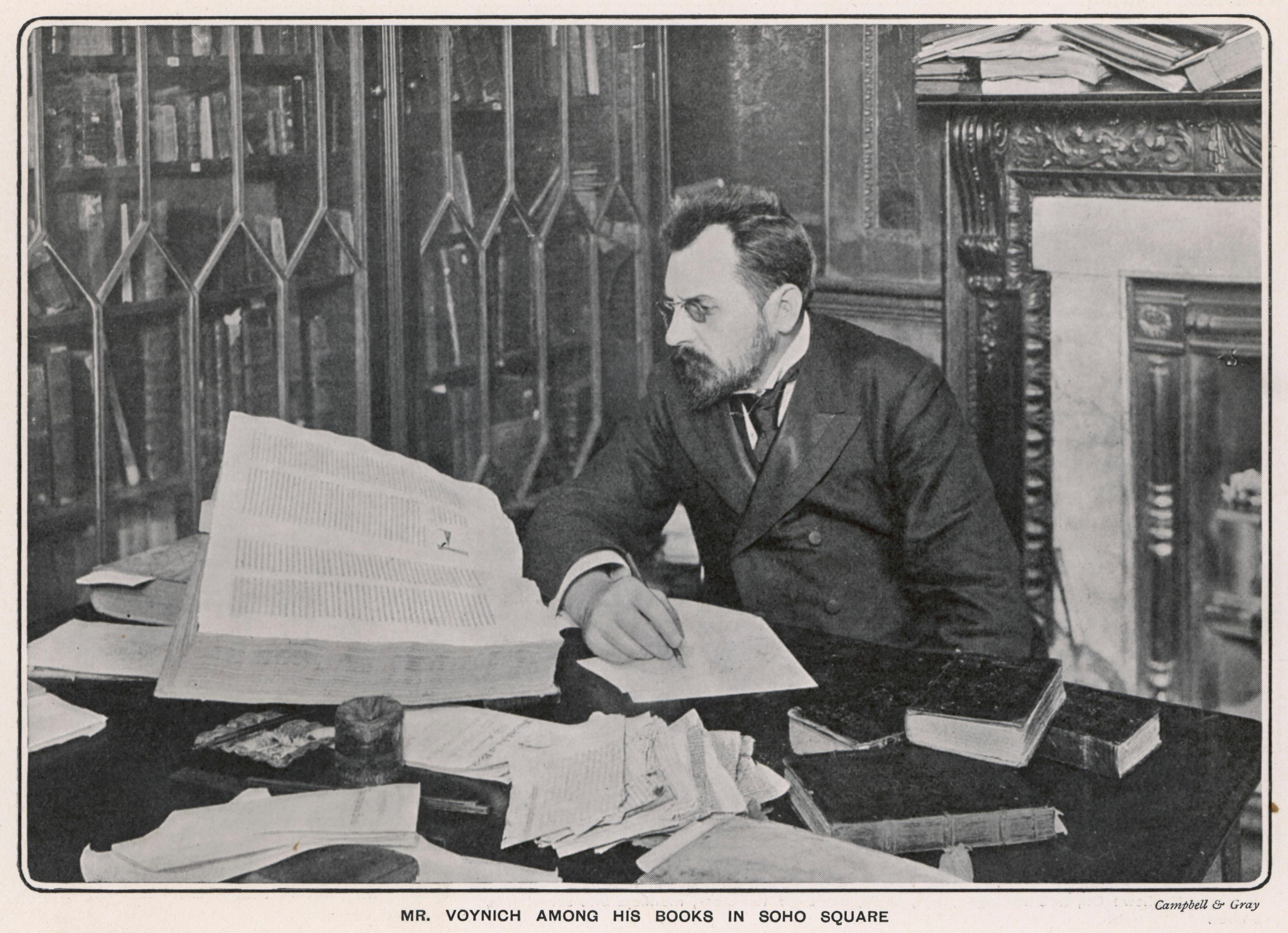
Voynich in his Soho Square bookshop, c. 1899

In June 1890 he escaped from Siberia and travelling west by train got to Hamburg, eventually arriving in London in October 1890. Under the assumed name of Ivan Kel'chevskii at first, he worked with Sergius Stepniak, a fellow revolutionary, under the banner of the anti-tsarist Society of Friends of Russian Freedom in London. After Stepniak's death in a railway crossing accident in 1895, Voynich ceased revolutionary activity.

Voynich became an antiquarian bookseller from around 1897, acting on the advice of Richard Garnett, a curator at the British Museum. Voynich opened a bookshop at Soho Square in London in 1898. He was remarkably lucky in finding rare books, including a Malermi Bible in Italy in 1902.

In 1902, he married a fellow former revolutionary, Ethel Lilian Boole, daughter of the British mathematician George Boole, with whom Voynich had been associated since 1890. Voynich was naturalised as a British subject on 25 April 1904, taking the legal name Wilfrid Michael Voynich.

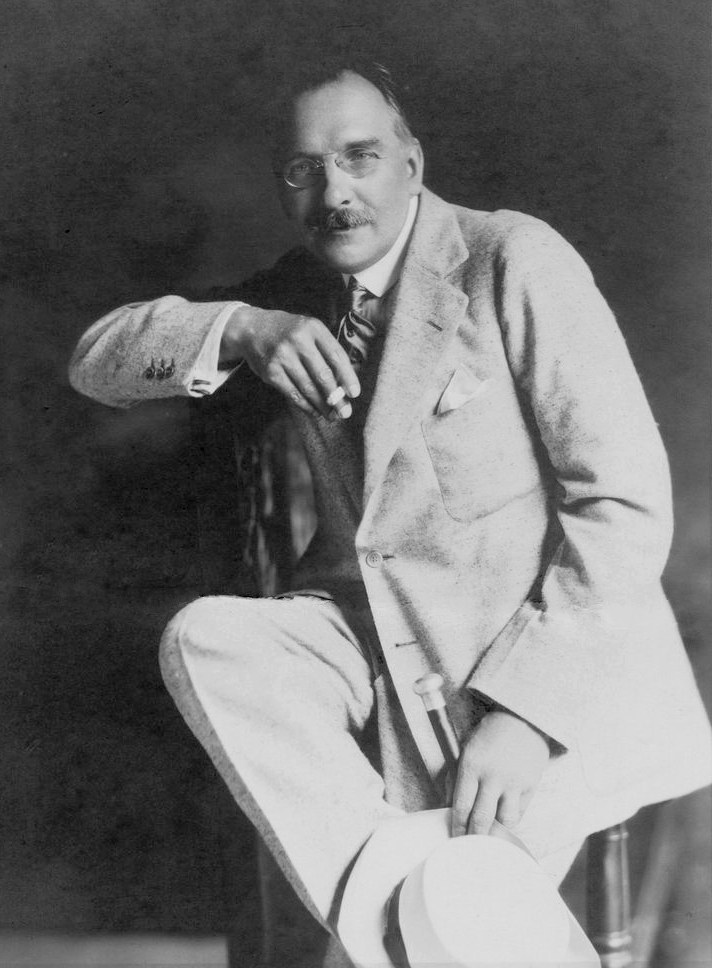
Voynich c. 1923

Voynich opened another bookshop in 1914 in New York. With the onset of the First World War, Voynich was increasingly based in New York. He became deeply involved in the antiquarian book trade, and wrote a number of catalogues and other texts on the subject.

Voynich relocated his London bookshop to 175 Piccadilly in 1917. Also in 1917, based on rumours, Voynich was investigated by the FBI, in relation to his possession of Bacon's cipher. The report also noted that he dealt with manuscripts from the 13th, 12th, and 11th centuries, and that the value of his books at the time was half a million dollars. However, the investigation did not reveal anything significant beyond the fact that he possessed a secret code nearly a millennium old.

Voynich died at Roosevelt Hospital in New York, in 1930, of lung cancer.

== Voynich manuscript ==
The most famous of Voynich's possessions was a mysterious manuscript he said he acquired in 1912 at the Villa Mondragone in Italy, but first presented in public in 1915. The book has been carbon-dated, which revealed that the materials were manufactured sometime between 1404 and 1438. He owned the manuscript until his death.

== See also ==
- List of Poles
