= Maria Bohuszewiczówna =

Polish revolutionary (1865–1887)

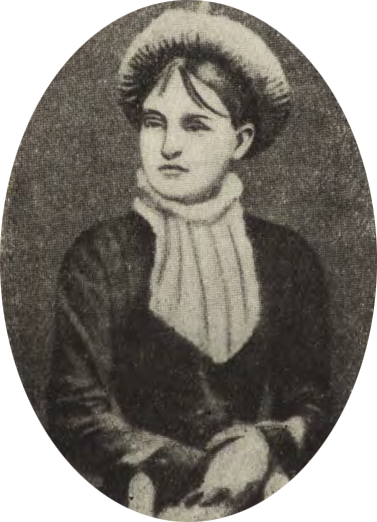
- Illustrated portrait of Bohuszewiczówna from a 1934 publication
- Born: Maria Stefania Bohuszewiczówna; 4 January 1865; Ceperce, Slutsky Uyezd, Minsk Governorate, Russian Empire
- Died: 1887 (aged 22); Krasnoyarsk, Yenisey Governorate, Russian Empire
- Other names: Regina, Wanda and Weneda
- Education: Flying University
- Years active: 1882-1885
- Organization: Political Red Cross
- Political party: First Proletariat
- Parents: Włodzimierz (father); Henryka née Mioduszewska (mother)
- Relatives: Tadeusz Kościuszko

Maria Stefania Bohuszewiczówna (1865–1887) was a Polish revolutionary and a leader of the First Proletariat party.

== Biography ==
Bohuszewiczówna was born on 4 January 1865 in the village of Ceperce (near Slutsk in what is now Belarus). She moved to Warsaw in 1874. In 1882 and 1883 she attended courses at the Flying University. From 1882 she was active in the Political Red Cross. After a wave of arrests in July 1884, Bohuszewiczówna, aged 19, was elected to lead the central committee of the First Proletariat party.

On 2 March 1885 Bohuszewiczówna organized a demonstration for the unemployed at Castle Square. For this activity she was arrested on 29 September 1885, and imprisoned in the Warsaw Citadel. After Bohuszewiczówna's arrest, leadership of the party went to Marian Ulrych. On 12 May 1887 she was sentenced to internal exile in Siberia. She died in 1887 in Krasnoyarsk while on the way to her assigned location.

Bohuszewiczówna was the great-granddaughter of the Polish statesman Tadeusz Kościuszko.
