= Stanisław Kunicki =

Polish revolutionary

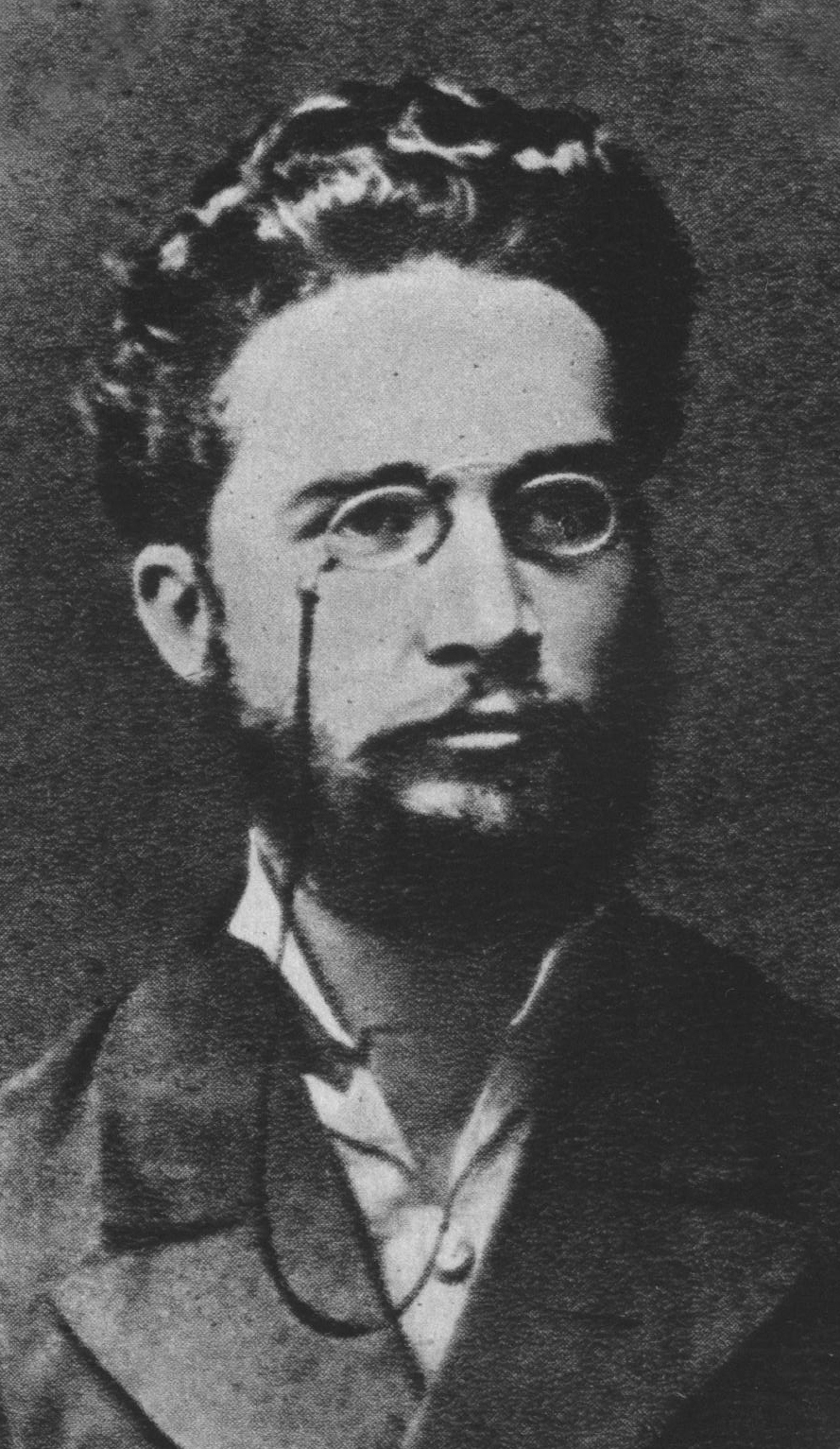
- Portrait of Kunicki, 1881
- Born: 6 June 1861; Tiflis, Tiflis Governorate, Russian Empire
- Died: 28 January 1886 (aged 24); Warsaw Citadel, Warsaw Governorate, Congress Poland
- Cause of death: Execution
- Other name: Abram Bendin
- Years active: 1870s–1884
- Era: 19th century
- Political party: First Proletariat
- Other political affiliations: Narodnaya Volya
- Movement: Socialism
- Criminal penalty: Death by hanging
- Parents: Czesław (father); Helena née Popiejka (mother)

Stanisław Kunicki (6 June 1861 – 28 January 1886) was a Polish revolutionary.

== Biography ==
Kunicki was born into the nobility to a Polish father and a Georgian mother on 8 June 1861. During his student days in St. Petersburg he joined the Polish St. Petersburg Social Revolutionary Party, which was one of the groups that merged in 1883 to form the Polish First Proletariat party. Kunicki became a member of the new party's central committee.

Kunicki also participated in the People's Will party and advocated for an agreement between it and the First Proletariat.

Kunicki was arrested on 28 June 1884 and was sentenced to death. He was hanged on 28 January 1886 in the Warsaw Citadel.
