= Proletariat (party) =

Name for three Polish political parties

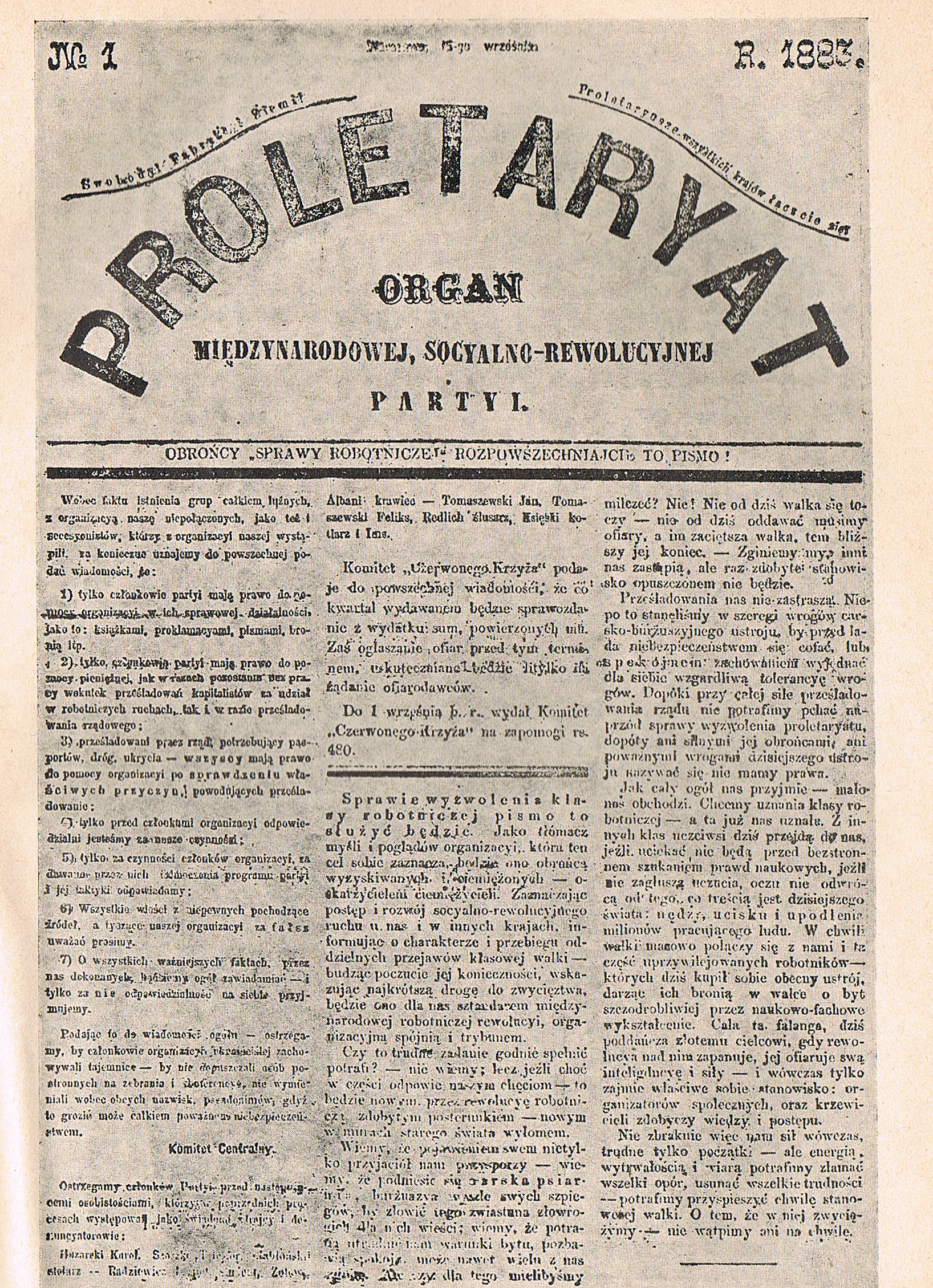
The front page of the First Proletariat's organ Proletaryat, №1, 1883

Proletariat is the name used to refer to three Polish political parties:

- The First Proletariat (International Social Revolutionary Party "Proletariat" (Polish: Międzynarodowa Socjalno-Rewolucyjna Partia "Proletariat") (1882–1886)), also called the Great Proletariat.
- The Second Proletariat (Social Revolutionary Party "Proletariat" (Polish: Socjalno-Rewolucyjna Partia "Proletariat") (1888–1893)), also called the Small Proletariat.
- The Third Proletariat (Polish Socialist Party "Proletariat" (Polish: Polska Partia Socjalistyczna "Proletariat") (1900–1909)).

== First Proletariat ==
The First Proletariat (or Great Proletariat) was the first Polish socialist party as well as the first socialist party in the Russian Empire. It was founded in 1882 by Ludwik Waryński from members of Warsaw socialist circles

At a meeting in Vilna in 1883, The First Proletariat joined with parties from other cities in creating a central committee composed of Waryński, Stanisław Kunicki, Tadeusz Rechniewski, and others. Other important party activists were Edmund Płoski, Maria Bohuszewiczówna, Marian Stefan Ulrych, Aleksandra Jentysówna, and Henryk Dulęba.

In March 1884 the First Proletariat formed an alliance with the People's Will and embraced political and economic terror as a means to combat autocracy. The party supported proletarian internationalism and opposed the Polish independence movement.

In 1883-1884 several of the chief activists were arrested and the party lost much of its power. Rosa Luxemburg, a prominent Polish revolutionary socialist, joined Proletariat in 1886. In July of the same year, the party was crushed as many of its remaining members were imprisoned or executed. The First Proletariat disbanded that year, but many of its traditions would be continued by the Second Proletariat.

== Second Proletariat ==
The Second Proletariat (or Small Proletariat) was founded in 1888 by merging the remaining organisation of the First Proletarian (led by Marcin Kasprzak) and a student group led by Ludwik Kulczycki. A notable member of the Second Proletariat was Rosa Luxemburg, who joined it in 1886.

The Second Proletariat also embraced terror as means to combat autocracy. Representatives of the Second Proletariata participated in the founding congress of the Second International in Paris in 1889. In 1891 a faction emerged in the party which opposed the tactics of terror. In 1893 the party merged with three other parties to create the Polish Socialist Party.

== Third Proletariat ==
The Third Proletariat was created in 1900 as a splinter group of the Polish Socialist Party. It was led by Ludwik Kulczycki and, beset by Tsarist repression, ceased operations in 1909.
