= Tunka, Republic of Buryatia =

Village in Buryat Republic, Russia

Tunka Тунка; Түнхэн
- Village
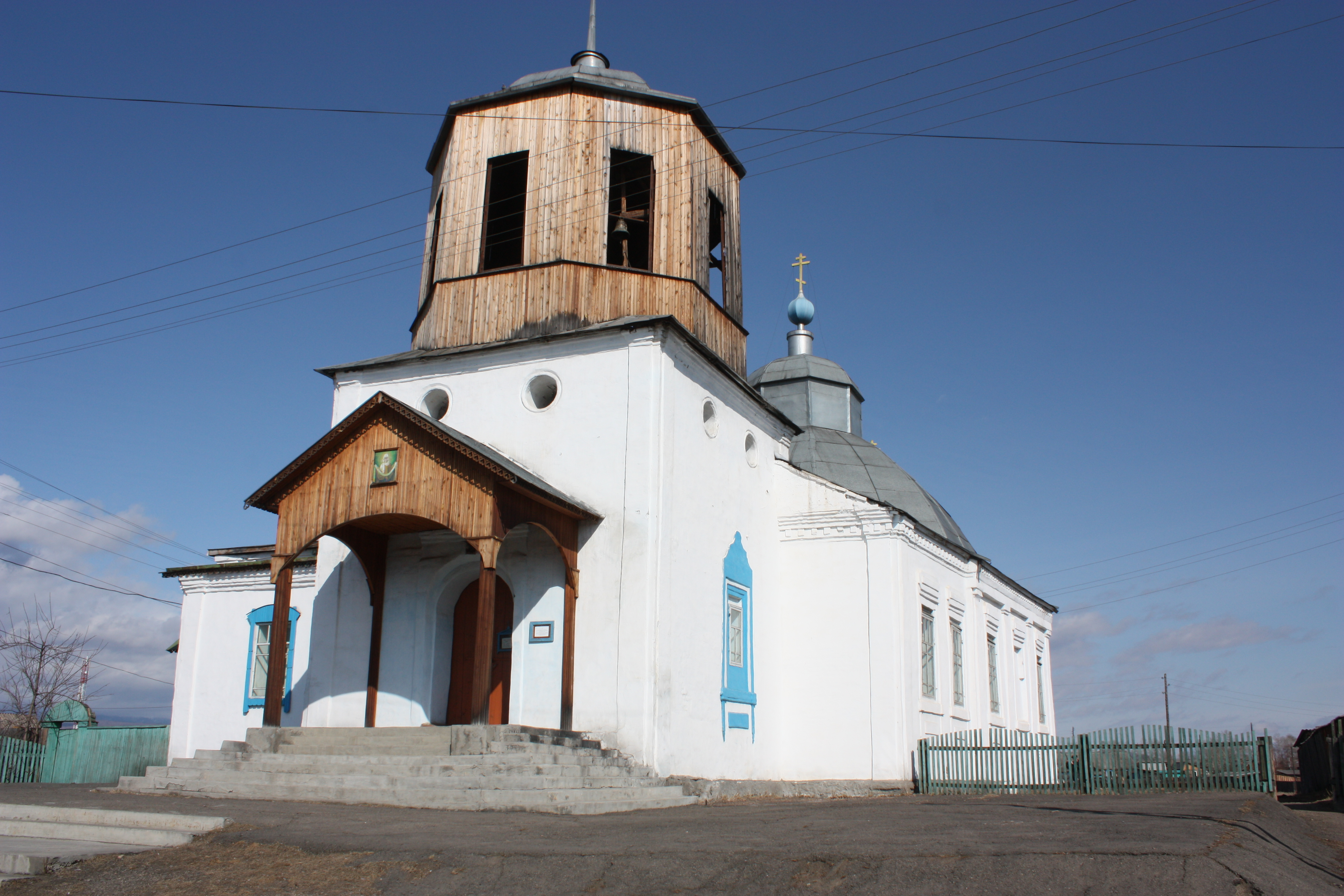
- Church of the Intercession in the village of Tunka

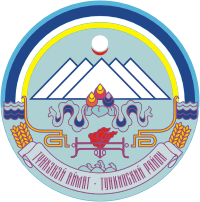
- Coat of arms

- Location within Russia
- Coordinates: 51°45′N 102°33′E
- Country: Russia
- Federal subject: Republic of Buryatia
- District: Tunkinsky District

Tunka (Russian: Тунка; Buryat: Түнхэн, Tünkhen) is a village in Tunkinsky District of the Buryat Republic, Russia, located southwest of Irkutsk in the Tunka Valley.

In the 19th century, it served as a settlement to where a large number of political prisoners were forcibly resettled. Among them was a group of Catholic priests, 145 altogether, arrested during the 1863 January Uprising against the Russian Empire. Among other notable political prisoners kept there were Bronisław Szwarce and Józef Piłsudski. Wilfrid Michael Voynich was held there from late December 1887 to late June 1889.

The Tunka Advanced Instrument for cosmic ray physics and Gamma Astronomy (TAIGA) is located close by in the same Tunka valley.
