= Theology of Pope Pius IX =

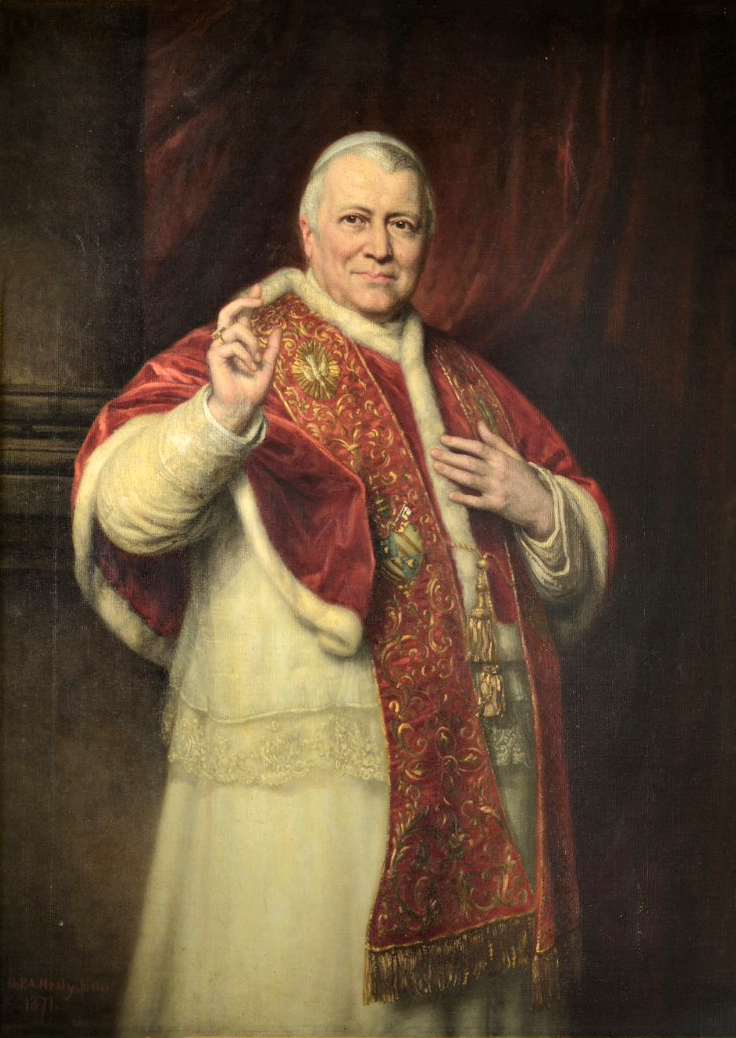
Portrait of Pope Pius IX by George Peter Alexander Healy, 1871

The theology of Pope Pius IX championed the pontiff's role as the highest teaching authority in the Church.

== Intellectual and apologetic efforts ==
He promoted the foundations of Catholic Universities in Belgium and France and supported Catholic associations with the intellectual aim to explain the faith to non-believers and non-Catholics. The Ambrosian Circle in Italy, the Union of Catholic Workers in France and the Pius Verein and the Deutsche Katholische Gesellschaft in Germany all tried to bring the Catholic faith in its fullness to people outside of the Church.

== Mariology ==
Pope Pius IX was deeply religious and shared a strong devotion to the Virgin Mary with many of his contemporaries, who made major contributions to Roman Catholic Mariology. Marian doctrines featured prominently in 19th century theology, especially the issue of the Immaculate Conception of Mary. During his pontificate petitions increased requesting the dogmatization of the Immaculate Conception. In 1848 Pius appointed a theological commission to analyze the possibility for a Marian dogma.

== Thirty-eight Encyclicals ==
In a record 38 encyclicals, Pius took positions on Church issues. They include: Qui pluribus (1846) on faith and religion; Praedecessores nostros (1847) on aid for famine-struck Ireland; Ubi primum 1849 on the Immaculate Conception; Nostis et nobiscum 1849 on the Church in the Papal States; Neminem vestrum 1854 on the persecution of Armenians in the Ottoman Empire; Cum nuper 1858 on care for clerics; Amantissimus 1862 on the care of the churches; Meridionali Americae 1865 on the Seminary for the Native Clergy; Omnem sollicitudinem 1874 on the Byzantine Rite; Quod nunquam 1875 on the Church in Prussia. On 7 February 1862 he issued the papal constitution Ad universalis Ecclesiae dealing with the conditions for admission to religious orders in which solemn vows are prescribed. Unlike popes in the 20th century, Pius IX did not use encyclicals to explain the faith in its details, but to show problem areas and errors in the Church and in various countries.

His December 1864 encyclical Quanta cura contained the Syllabus of Errors, an appendix that listed and condemned as heresy 80 propositions, many on political topics, and firmly established his pontificate in opposition to secularism, rationalism, and modernism in all its forms. The document affirmed that the Church is a true and perfect society entirely free, endowed with proper and perpetual rights of her own, conferred upon her by her Divine Founder, supreme over any secular authority. The ecclesiastical power can exercise its authority without the permission and assent of the civil government. The Church has the power of defining dogmatically that the religion of the Catholic Church is the only true religion. After centuries of being dominated by States and secular powers, the Pope thus defended the rights of the Church to free expression and opinion, even if particular views violated the perception and interests of secular forces, which in Italy at the time tried to dominate many Church activities, episcopal appointments, and even the education of the clergy in seminaries.

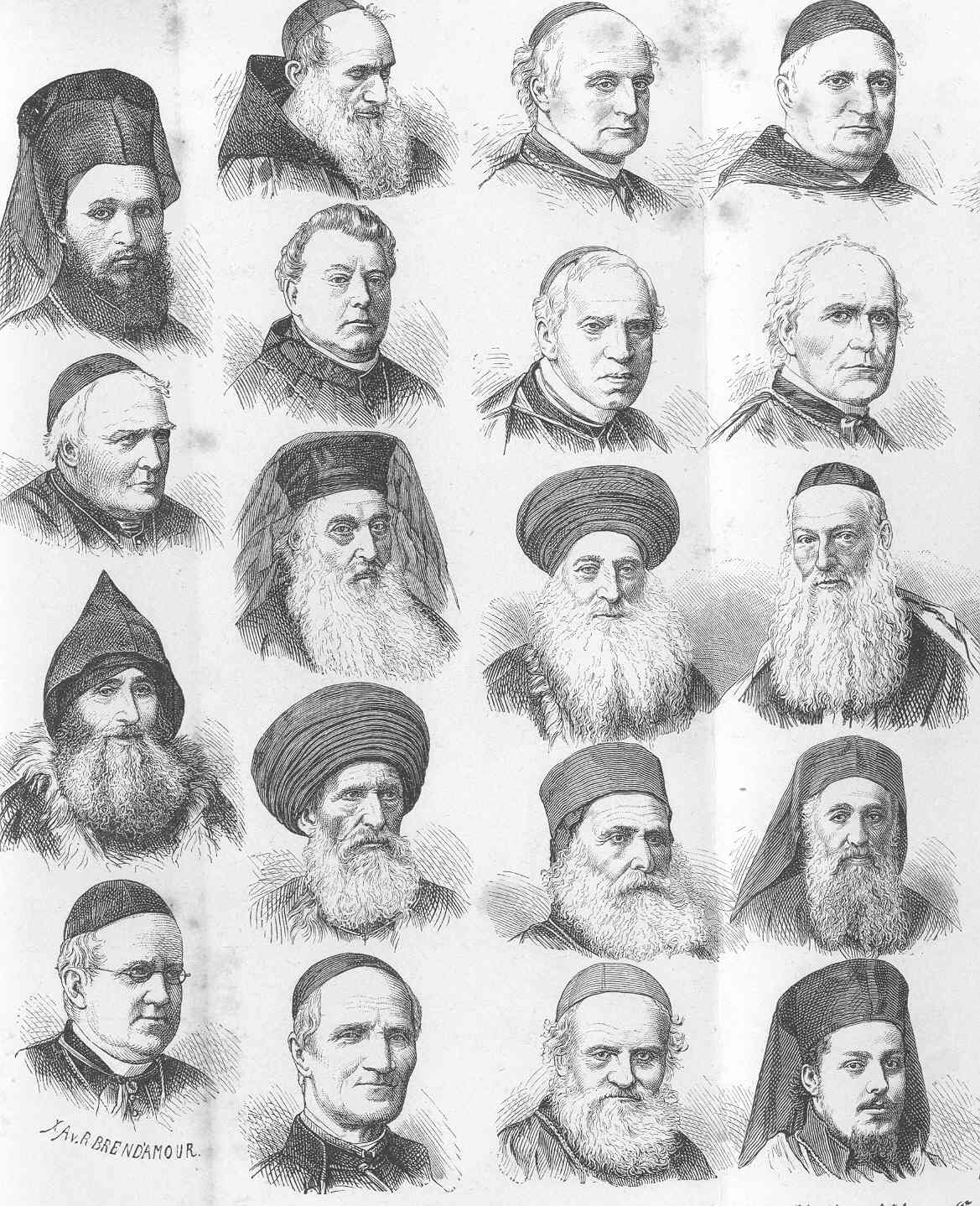
Council Fathers of Vatican One in 1870

The Syllabus nevertheless was controversial at the time. "The Pope whose influence and State was seen as declining, even ending before the Syllabus, was at once the center of attention as the powerful enemy of progress, a man of boundless power and dangerous influence." Anti-Catholic forces viewed the papal document as an attack on progress, while many Catholics were happy to see their rights defined and defended against the encroachment of national governments. European Catholics welcomed the idea that national churches are not subject to state authority, an idea long practiced in France, Spain, and Portugal under various versions of Gallicanism. American Catholics, who saw agreement of the papal views on the role of the State in Church affairs with those of the founding fathers, rejoiced over the definition of temporal rights in the areas of education, marriage and family.

== First Vatican Council ==
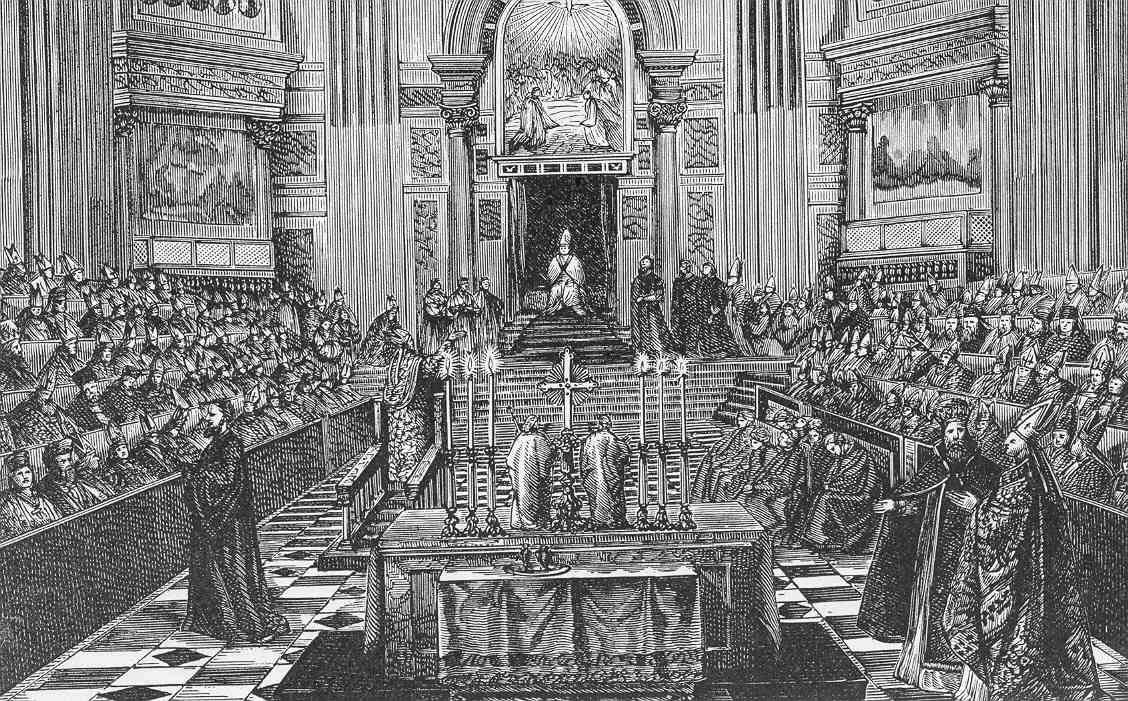
The First Vatican Council presided by Pius IX

Pius IX was the first pope to popularize encyclicals on a large scale to foster his views. He decisively acted on the century-old struggle between Dominicans and Franciscans regarding the Immaculate Conception of Mary, deciding in favour of the latter ones. However, this decision, which he formulated as an infallible dogma, raised the question, can a Pope in fact make such decisions without the bishops? This foreshadowed one topic of the Vatican Council which he later convened for 1869. The Pope did consult the bishops beforehand with his encyclical Ubi Primum (see below), but insisted on having this issue clarified nevertheless. The council was to deal with Papal Infallibility not on its own but as an integral part of its consideration of the definition of the Catholic Church and the role of the bishops in it. As it turned out, this was not possible because of the imminent attack by Italy against the Papal States, which forced a premature suspension of the First Vatican Council. Thus the major achievements of Pius IX are his Mariology and Vatican I.

The Vatican Council did prepare several decrees, which, with small changes, were all signed by Pius IX. They refer to the Catholic faith, God the creator of all things, divine revelation, the relation between faith and human reasoning, the primacy of the papacy and the infallibility of the papacy. It was noted that the theological style of Pius was often negative, stating obvious errors rather than stating what is right. Pius was noted for overstating his case at times, which was explained in part due to his epileptic condition. This created problems inside and outside the Church but also resulted in a clearing of the air and in much attention to his utterings, which otherwise may not have materialized.

== Renewal and reforms ==
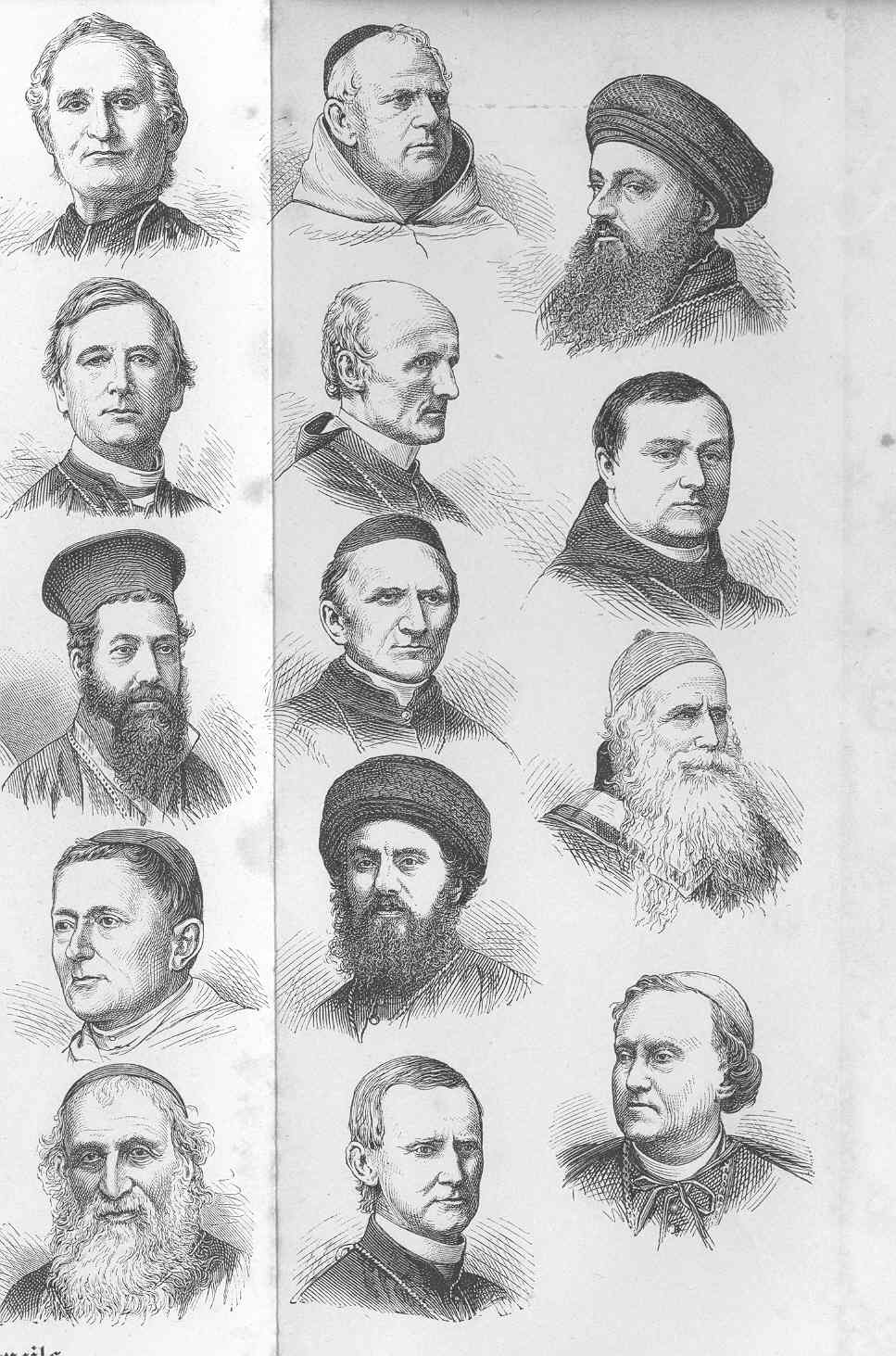
Council Fathers of Vatican One

Contrary to stiff ultra-conservative sterility, which some attempted to associate with Pius IX, an extraordinary renewal of Catholic vigour and religious life took place during his pontificate: The entire episcopate was reappointed, and religious orders and congregations experienced a growth and vitality, which was not anticipated by anyone at the beginning of his papacy in 1846. Existing orders had numerous applications and expanded, sending many of their “excess” vocation to missionary activities in Africa and Asia. Pius IX approved 74 new ones for women alone. In France, where the Church was devastated after the French Revolution, there were 160.000 Religious when Pius IX died in 1878, in addition to the regular priests, working in the parishes. Pius created over 200 news bishop seats, oversaw an unprecedented growth of the Church in the USA and created new hierarchies in several countries.

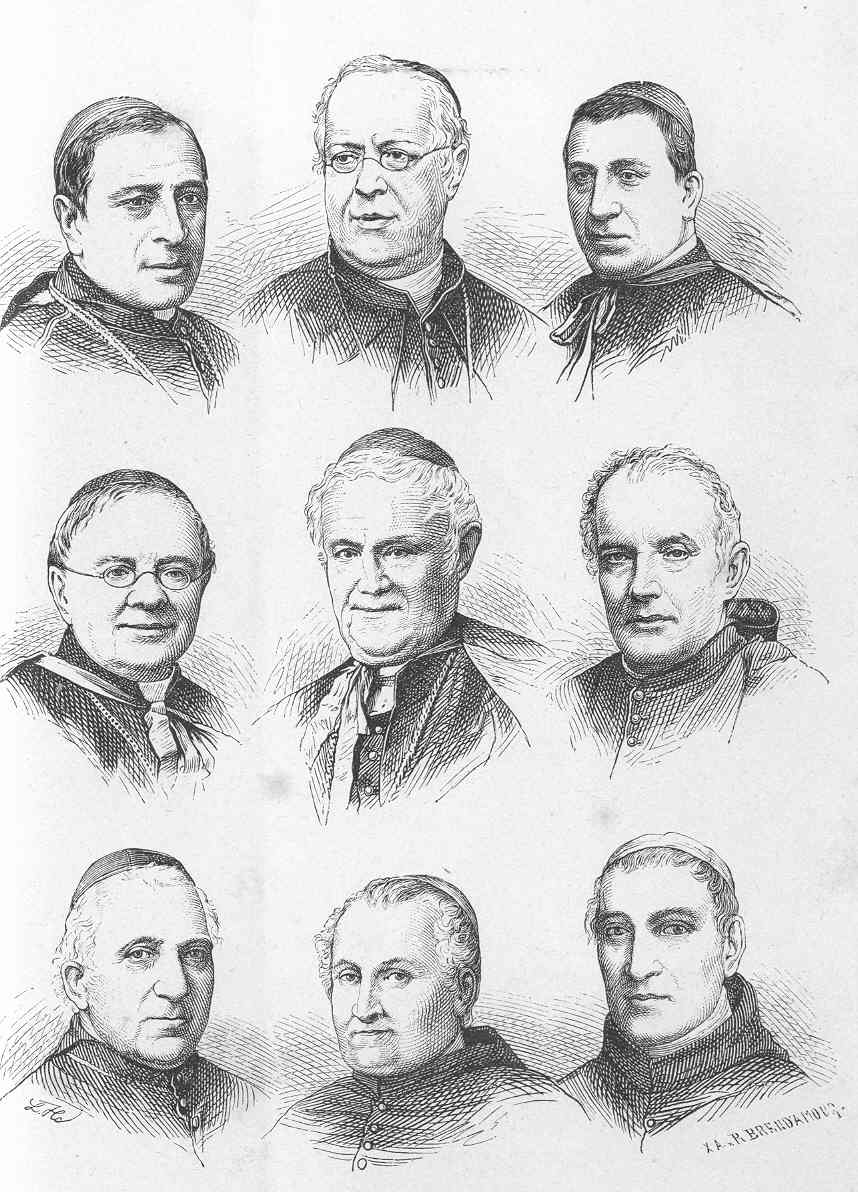
Council Fathers of Vatican One

Encouraged by Rome, Catholic lay people began to participate again in pilgrimages, spiritual retreats, baptisms and confessions and Catholic associations of all kinds. The great number of vocations led Pius to issue several admonitions to Bishops, to weed out candidates with moral weaknesses. He founded several seminaries in Rome, to ensure that only the best are admitted to the priestly service. Lazy priests or priests who did not perform were punished or dismissed from their service. On the other hand, he also reformed the system of Church discipline, getting rid of some indulgences, causes for excommunication, suspensions of clergy and other disciplinary measures. He did not, however, undertake an overall reform of Canon Law.

Catholic monasteries are officially not under the local jurisdiction of the papacy, yet Pius IX on 21 June 1847, addressed them and asked for reforms. He wrote, that monasteries form an indispensable bridge between the secular and religious world and fulfill therefore an important function for the Church as a whole. He mandated a reform of monastic discipline and outlawed century old practices, by which men and women were given eternal vows and forced to stay in the convent or monastery without prior probation periods. He mandated a waiting period of three years for entry into a monastery, and declared all monastic vows without the three years as invalid. Specifics included reform of the monastic habits, music and the theological preparation in the monasteries. most but not all of them accepted the reforms of the Pope. Pius did not hesitate to impose reform-minded superiors in several congregations. A special relation existed between him and the Jesuit order, which had educated him as a young boy. Jesuits were said to be influential during his pontificate, which created misgivings and animosity in the secular media at the time.
