= Error has no rights =

Historic Catholic concept

"Error has no rights" (Latin: Error non habet ius) is a historical Catholic and traditionalist Catholic concept. It asserts that it is the responsibility of governments to suppress non-Catholic religions as they do not have a right to express publicly any religion outside of Catholicism which should be the only religion allowed by the State, but had the right to privately profess and practice any religion. Alternatively, it asserts that while non-Catholics had civil or political rights, there is no theological toleration for such religious beliefs. While it was still the official position of the Catholic Church in the 1950s, it was repudiated or superseded in the Second Vatican Council of 1962–1965 by Dignitatis humanae.

It is also argued, based on the interpretation that the moral right to error is distinct from the legal right, that this principle was not superseded by Dignitatis Humanae.

== Principle ==
This principle states that non-Catholics must not have any civil or political rights and do not have the right to express publicly any religion outside of Catholicism, however they had the right to privately profess and practice any religion; moreover, this principle states that Catholicism should be the only religion allowed by the State.

It was also argued that the principle meant that although error had no rights, people in error had rights. In this interpretation, the state only suppresses those errors which are a danger to public safety rather all things it identifies as errors. It is also suggested that it was a rejection of theological or moral right rather than a legal right.

Catholic theology prior to Vatican II held that the ideal was a confessional state unified with the Catholic Church, with the reasoning that the Catholic Church's revealed truth would lead to "perfect justice", and if the state allowed error to be expressed, it would detract from this. The underpinning of this preference for an absolutist confessional state was the view that error had no rights, and that non-Catholics could or should be persecuted. According to this traditional view, people who were not members of the Catholic Church did not deserve any civil and political rights because they were deemed to be in error.

To put it simply, the principle flowed "from a whole series of theological and political premises: that individuals are obligated to embrace religious truth; that Catholicism is the one true religion; that religious liberty is to be understood as an empowerment, as the moral right of individuals to profess and practice their beliefs; that 'total care' of the common good [...] is committed to the state; that religious truth is an integral element of this good; and that the state's total care for the common good thus encompasses the care of religion".

== History ==
For centuries, the Catholic Church maintained a close connection to the State and used state coercion (such as the Inquisition) to punish people whom they deemed to be heretics. In practice, while often persecuted, non-Catholics in Catholic-majority countries were sometimes tolerated, often either because of the personal sensitivities by members of the clergy, or out of hope of converting people to Catholicism.

In 1832, Pope Gregory XVI released the encyclical Mirari vos, which rejected freedom of the press, religious liberty, and separation of church and state as based on indifferentism. Liberty of conscience, Gregory wrote, was "a pestilence more deadly to the state than any other". The arguments condemning freedom of religion were reiterated by Pius IX in his 1864 encyclical Quanta cura and the attached Syllabus of Errors.

The "error has no rights" principle was still the official position of the Catholic Church in the 1950s. At the time, the implementation of the "error has not rights" principle made it so that in Latin America and Southern Europe, where Catholics had power, Protestants suffered religious persecutions as they had no rights due to their religious choice.

== Superseding ==
The American Catholic theologian John Courtney Murray worked throughout the 1950s to reconcile Catholic teachings with religious pluralism and democracy. His ideas encountered significant resistance from more traditional-minded Catholics, but were supported by bishop Karol Wojtyla, the future Pope John Paul II, at Vatican II. John Courtney Murray's ideas were eventually included in the Vatican II reforms as the Declaration on Religious Liberty, a.k.a. Dignitatis humanae (1965). According to this view, further elaborated upon, yet consistent with prior Church teaching, in Dignitatis Humanae, people do have rights even if they are considered in error. "[Joseph C. Fenton's] most important public controversy was with the Jesuit theologian John Courtney Murray over the latter's unorthodox interpretation of church teaching on church-state relations. Murray's dissenting position was adopted in the Declaration of Religious Freedom at Vatican Council II in 1964, and Fenton's positions have been eclipsed".

Dignitatis humanae keeps the theological premises of the "error has no rights" principle, but "implicitly modifies the political theory underlying it. To begin with, it distinguishes between the common good in toto and that 'component' of this good which is entrusted in a 'special' manner to the state, affirming that the care of the common good devolves not upon the state alone, but 'upon the people as a whole, upon social groups, upon government, and upon the Church and other religious communities ... in the manner proper to each'. Secondly, it distinguishes between the moral and juridical dimensions of religious liberty, between the question of our obligations toward religious truth, and the question of the role of the state in enforcing these obligations. Finally, it brings into play the whole subject of the implications of our dignity as persons—as beings who possess intelligence and freedom—for the pursuit of religious truth and ordering of human social life".

After Vatican II, some Catholic leaders, such as Cardinal Józef Glemp and part of the Spanish Church hierarchy, still sympathized with the older "error has no rights" approach. However, they realized that it was inconsistent with developments in the world at large and therefore supported counter-proselytization rather than legal restrictions on non-Catholic religions. Some traditionalist Catholics such as Society of St. Pius X have rejected the Vatican II reforms, especially their teaching on religious liberty.

== See also ==
- Accommodationism
- Integralism
- Religious pluralism
- Religious tolerance
- Theological notes
