= Decree against Communism =

1949 Catholic Church document

The Decree against Communism was a 1949 Catholic Church document issued by the Supreme Sacred Congregation of the Holy Office, and approved by Pope Pius XII, which declared Catholics who openly professed atheistic communist doctrines to be excommunicated as apostates from the Christian faith. It did not prohibit membership in communist parties per se, but applied to Catholic communists who 'abandoned their faith'. The decree was issued in response to pro-communist and state-sponsored Catholic associations being founded in the socialist Eastern Bloc, which prompted fears of schism. The Vatican stopped enforcing the decree after reaching compromises with the socialist states, starting with an agreement reached with the Polish People's Republic in 1950. The decree has since been abrogated.

== Background ==
Socialism and communism in Catholic social teaching had been already addressed in the teachings of popes since the encyclicals Nostis et nobiscum (1849), Quanta cura (1864), and Rerum novarum (1891). Interpretations of these encyclicals and the stance towards socialism expressed in them varied. Catholic journalist G. K. Chesterton, who formulated distributism based on his interpretation of Rerum Novarum, believed that the Catholic encyclicals condemned socialism and postulated an alternative economic system that would be neither capitalist nor socialist.

Others, like Eugène-Melchior de Vogüé, argued that the papal encyclicals only constituted a condemnation of some, anti-clerical, forms of socialism. British philosopher Andrew Collier believed that Chesterton misinterpreted Rerum Novarum as the Catholic argument against socialism, and instead interpreted Rerum Novarum as an argument for Catholic socialism, arguing that "the aim of Rerum Novarum can only be achieved via Marxist methods". Costa Rican Archbishop Víctor Manuel Sanabria Martínez also argued: "The Rerum Novarum [is not] anti-socialist, anti-communist, anti-red. [It is] pro social justice, pro workers, pro social obligations."

After revolutions in Russia, China, and Mexico had been followed by religious persecution, a new theme of criticism was added, beginning with Quadragesimo anno (1931) by Pope Pius XI. This encyclical objected to what it considered to be communism's professed opposition to religion, and its threat to the freedom and the very existence of the Church. In 1937, Pius XI rejected atheistic communism in an encyclical entitled Divini Redemptoris as "a system full of errors and sophisms", with a "pseudo-ideal of justice, equality, and fraternity" and "a certain false mysticism", and contrasted it with a humane society (civitas humana).

After the 1948 Italian general election, in which the communist-socialist coalition won 31% of the vote, the Holy Office began to study the issue of communism in order to give guidance to Catholic lay people and clergy with questions about support for communist parties.

An additional impulse for Vatican action against communism arose in Czechoslovakia, where the communist government, installed by a coup d'état in February 1948, undertook a campaign to take control of the Catholic Church by several means. Among other measures, it created an organization of priests favorable to the regime, took control of church finances, and demanded that pastoral letters to the faithful or the clergy be approved by government ministries.

On July 15, 1948, L'Osservatore Romano published a decree which excommunicated those who propagate "the materialistic and anti-Christian teachings of Communism". The document, however, did not mention the Italian Communist Party, which had changed its statutes in 1946, removing an explicit profession of Marxism-Leninism, and opening to participation by citizens, "independent of race, religious faith or philosophical convictions".

In the spring of 1949, pressure on the Church in Czechoslovakia was increasing, and, according to Cardinal Giovanni Battista Montini, then papal Secretary of State, Pope Pius XII, had come to feel that there would be no effective diplomatic opposition from the West. Thus, the Church had to use what means it had to confront communism, not only in the immediate situation, but for a long-term opposition.

== Form of the document ==
The document, as published in the Acta Apostolicae Sedis, bears the date July 1, 1949 and the heading Decretum (Decree), and is presented in the form of a dubium: that is, in question-and-answer format. It presents four questions, together with the Holy Office's replies: (1) Is it licit to join or show favor to Communist parties? (2) Is it licit to publish, distribute, or read publications that support Communist doctrine or activity, or to write for them? (3) May Christians who knowingly and freely commit the acts in parts 1 and 2 be given the sacraments? (4) Do Christians who profess, defend, or promote materialistic Communist doctrine incur the penalty of excommunication as apostates from the Christian faith, with the penalty reserved so that it may only be lifted by the Holy See?

The answers in the decree were negative to the first three questions and affirmative to the fourth.

== Publication and reception ==
After the document was approved by Pius XII on June 30, the text of the document was delivered to printers to prepare its release. Shortly thereafter, it was leaked to the press, and so appeared in public early, with no advance notice to the clergy and no commentary to explain the document.

The decree was published in the Vatican newspaper L'Osservatore Romano on July 16, 1949. A commentary followed on July 27, 1949, explaining reasons for its condemnation of communist activity and doctrine. It also made clear the scope of the excommunication stated in the decree: it did not apply to all people who voted for communists or supported the party, but only to people who held the materialistic and atheistic doctrines of communism.

The decree met with some surprising public support from non-Catholics despite the disorder around its publication: from Protestant countries, there was favorable commentary which recognized the decree as a response to communist pressure on the Church in Eastern Europe. The United States urged the Patriarch of Constantinople Athenagoras, who supported the decree, to issue a similar document for the Eastern Orthodox world.

Response from pro-communist newspapers in Italy was sharply critical, but the Soviet press was silent. Italian Communist Party General Secretary Palmiro Togliatti was restrained in his criticism, inasmuch as many party supporters were practicing Catholics. The party itself was "not disturbed by the decree, and predicted that it would be rescinded".

== Repercussions ==
In the wake of the Decree, Pope Pius XII encouraged efforts to develop Catholic social teaching and thus counteract the appeal of communist social doctrine. The Decree marked the beginning of a long institutional conflict between Catholicism and communism. The Holy Office issued later documents condemning communism:

- Excommunication of Bishop Dechet, February 18, 1950 (lifted in 1951),
- Membership in communist youth organizations, September 28, 1950,
- Usurpation of Church functions by the State, June 29, 1950,
- Illegitimate state ordered ordinations of bishops, April 9, 1951,
- Publications favouring totalitarian Communism, June 28 and July 22, 1955,

A further dubium dated April 4, 1959 from the Holy Office and ratified by Pope John XXIII made the provisions of the 1949 Decree more specific, stating that it implied a prohibition on voting for parties that were helping communists, even if such parties themselves had inoffensive doctrines or even called themselves Christian.

However, the decree itself did not prohibit membership in a communist party. Fr. Richard J. Murphy, an authority on Catholic canon law, clarified that the decree applied to Catholic communists who "abandoned the faith"; in contrast, a Catholic that is a member of a communist party but "does fulfill his religious obligations", would not be excommunicated. He also noted that the decree did not apply to non-atheist communist parties, and for the decree to apply to the party "would require that the organisation profess atheism as its principle foundation".

== Aftermath ==
A portion of Catholic clergy and laymen criticized the decree. Primo Mazzolari openly defied the decree and advocated dialogue between Catholics and Communists instead. Giuseppe Dossetti, a Catholic priest who represented the left-wing faction of the Christian Democracy party, also protested the decree and argued for neutrality in the Cold War instead. Communist parties at large were unaffected by the decree, and the Vatican's anti-communist stance "then gradually subsided."

Historian Peter C. Kent wrote that the decree "was prompted by fears of schism in eastern Europe". The socialist governments of the Eastern Bloc founded associations of priests that either supported communism or were willing to cooperate with the state; clergy belonging to such organizations received favours by being appointed to administrative positions. This development "raised the terrible spectre of attempts to found schismatic ‘national’ churches" in Pope Pius XII. In 1950, the archbishop of Warsaw Stefan Wyszyński was able to reach an agreement with the Polish socialist government - in exchange for the passive support of the Polish Catholic Church for communist rule and policies, the state would permit religious classes in schools, maintain theology faculties in state universities, maintain chaplains in the army and preserve the independence of Catholic universities and religious orders.

Following the 1950 agreement with communist Poland, the Church started gradually pursuing a path of compromise with communist authorities instead. An anti-communist cardinal August Hlond, considered the "most loyal of prelates", admitted that he "supported what would become the Polish hierarchy’s policy by suggesting that the Vatican should have played a more subtle game with the new Communist regime". According to historian Domagoj Tomas, the Church would shift away from enforcing the decree and towards "Ostpolitik", based on reaching a modus vivendi between the Catholic Church and the communists.

In the 1950s, Archbishop Giovanni Montini (later Pope Paul VI) spoke of the need to approach the "good elements" amongst the communists, and the 1955 Christmas message of Pius XII was conciliatory, declaring that there was nothing "providential" or "historic" about communism, and warning Catholics "not to be content with an anti-communism based on the defense of a liberty empty of content". Cardinal Angelo Dell'Acqua qualified the decree, arguing that it specifically referred to atheistic communism:

Pius XII himself always spoke of ‘atheistic communism’, not simply of communism. Moreover, he always carefully avoided seeming to be associated with international crusades against communism.

Similar argument was made by the cardinal Alfred Bengsch, who argued "that the activity of the Church must be clearly differentiated from political or economic anti-communism".

== Validity ==
The decree was amended in 1966 when Pope Paul VI abrogated Canon 1399 of the 1917 Code of Canon Law. While some have argued that such Decree has been tacitly abrogated by the implementation of the Second Council of the Vatican, this has never been confirmed by the Holy See and the pastoral constitution Gaudium et spes has explicitly condemned materialistic and atheistic ideologies. The decree was fully abrogated with the introduction of the 1983 Code of Canon Law on 27 November 1983, as Canon 6 of the new Canon Law abrogated the 1917 code, along with "any universal or particular penal laws whatsoever issued by the Apostolic See unless they are contained in this Code" and "other universal or particular laws contrary to the prescripts of this Code unless other provision is expressly made for particular laws", and no new decrees on excommunication of communists were introduced.
