= List of encyclicals of Pope Pius IX =

This article contains a list of encyclicals of Pope Pius IX. Pius IX issued 41 papal encyclicals during his reign as pope:

No.	Title (Latin)	Title (English translation)	Subject	Date
1.	Qui pluribus		On Faith and Religion	9 November 1846
2.	Praedecessores nostros	Our Predecessors	On Aid for Ireland	25 March 1847
3.	Ubi primum		On Discipline for Religious	17 June 1847
4.	In Suprema Petri Apostoli Sede	On the Supreme Throne of Peter the Apostle	On the relations with the Eastern Orthodox Churches	6 January 1848
5.	Ubi primum	When First	On Immaculate Conception	2 February 1849
6.	Nostis et nobiscum	You Know and with Us	On the Church in the Papal States	8 December 1849
7.	Exultavit cor nostrum	Our Heart Rejoices	On the Effects of the Jubilee	21 November 1851
8.	Ex Aliis Nostris		On the 1851 Jubilee	21 November 1851
9.	Nemo certe ignorat		On Discipline for Clergy	25 March 1852
10.	Probe noscitis Venerabiles		On the Discipline for Clergy	17 May 1852
11.	Inter multiplices		Pleading for Unity of Spirit	21 March 1853
12.	Neminem vestrum		On the Persecution of Armenians	2 February 1854
13.	Optime noscitis		On the Proposed Catholic University of Ireland	20 March 1854
14.	Apostolicae nostrae caritatis		Urging Prayers of Peace	1 August 1854
15.	Optime noscitis		On Episcopal Meetings	5 November 1855
16.	Singulari quidem		On the Church in Austria	17 March 1856
17.	Cum nuper		On Care for Clerics	20 January 1858
18.	Amantissimi Redemptoris		On Priests and the Care of Souls	3 May 1858
19.	Cum Sancta Mater Ecclesia	With Holy Mother Church	Pleading for Public Prayer	27 April 1859
20.	Qui nuper		On the Pontifical States	18 June 1859
21.	Nullis certe verbis		On the Need for Civil Sovereignty	19 January 1860
22.	Amantissimus		On the Care of the Churches	8 April 1862
23.	Quanto conficiamur moerore		On Promotion of False Doctrines	10 August 1863
24.	Incredibili		On the Persecution in New Granada	17 September 1863
25.	Ubi urbaniano		On the January Uprising in the Kingdom of Poland	30 July 1864
26.	Maximae quidem		On the Church in Bavaria	18 August 1864
27.	Quanta cura		Condemning Current Errors Appendix: Syllabus of Errors	8 December 1864
28.	Levate		On the Affiliations of Church	27 October 1867
29.	Respicientes		Protesting the Capture of Rome	1 November 1870
30.	Ubi Nos	Our City	On the Pontifical States	15 May 1871
31.	Beneficia Dei		On the 25th Anniversary of His Pontificate	4 June 1871
32.	Saepe Venerabiles Fratres		Thanksgiving for 25 Years of Pontificate	5 August 1871
33.	Quartus supra		On the Church in Armenia	6 January 1873
34.	Etsi multa		On the Church in Italy, Germany and Switzerland	21 November 1873
35.	Vix dum a Nobis		On the Church in Austria	7 March 1874
36.	Omnem sollicitudinem		On the Greek-Ruthenian Rite	13 May 1874
37.	Gravibus Ecclesiae		Proclaiming A Jubilee	24 December 1874
38.	Quod nunquam		On the Church in Prussia	5 February 1875
39.	Graves ac diuturnae		On the Church in Switzerland	23 March 1875
40.	Exortae in ista		On the denunciation of the Freemasonry infiltrated among the Brazilian faithful	20 April 1876
41.	Quae in patriarchatu		On the situation of the Chaldean Catholic Church	1 September 1876
