= Allocution (disambiguation) =

Allocution may refer to:

- Allocution, in criminal procedure, a statement by the defendant before sentencing
- Papal allocution, a decision by the Pope
- Allocution (media theory), a form of communication
