= Dignitatis humanae =

Catholic Declaration on Religious Freedom

Dignitatis humanae (Note: The document is known by its incipit, the first words of the document in the original Latin text, as is customary for similar Catholic Church documents.) (Note: Latin pronunciation: [d̪iɲˈɲiː.t̪ä.t̪is ˈuː.mä.ne]) (Of the Dignity of the Human Person) is the Second Vatican Council's Declaration on Religious Freedom. In the context of the council's stated intention "to develop the doctrine of recent popes on the inviolable rights of the human person and the constitutional order of society", Dignitatis humanae spells out the church's support for the protection of religious liberty. It set the ground rules by which the church would relate to secular states.

The passage of this measure by a vote of 2,308 to 70 is considered by many to be one of the most significant events of the council. This declaration was promulgated by Pope Paul VI on December 7, 1965.

Dignitatis humanae became a point of dispute between the Vatican and traditionalist Catholics who argued that the council document was incompatible with previous authoritatively stated Catholic teaching.

== Background ==
=== Earlier Catholic view ===
Historically, the ideal of Catholic political organization was a tightly interwoven structure of the Catholic Church and secular rulers generally known as Christendom, with the Catholic Church having a favoured place in the political structure. In 1520, Pope Leo X in the papal bull Exsurge Domine had censured the proposition "That heretics be burned is against the will of the Spirit" as one of a number of errors that were "either heretical, scandalous, false, offensive to pious ears, or seductive of simple minds and against Catholic truth".

However, during the same period, the Catholic Church condemned the Regalist, Gallican and Caesaropapist heresies that aspired to a State, under the pretext of its Confessionality, with inherent rights to intervene in religious matters (such as the Conversion of people or the repression of Heresy) that were typically a protest of the ecclesiastical Jurisdiction. So, the Church rather defended the Augustinian and Thomist doctrine which stated that, only by concession of the Spiritual Power of the Papacy (considered of a higher order according to the Doctrine of the two swords), is that a Christian Government could use its Temporal Power in such matters, so that the civil Authority then could represses heresy or apostasy (if and only there was a just cause, something that only the Papacy could determine), but teaching as magisterial doctrine that it was not an inherent right of the State to be an institution with religious faculties, and therefore, the Church strongly condemned the Christian rulers who, during the European Wars of Religion, abused such concessions of the Church with the Patronato (or usurped the powers of the Catholic ecclesiastical Jurisdiction, as in the case of countries that embraced the Protestant Reformation and founded national Churches controlled by the State, such as the Anglican Church whose head was the King of England) in order to violate the rights of people who were not attached to the true Church, who according to the Holy See should be treated with compassion and called to correct themselves so that they return to Orthodoxy (not be brutally repressed without respect for a Presumption of innocence) while also condemning rulers who wanted to repress or ignore the rights of non-Christians, such as Muslims or Jews, who were not under the jurisdiction of Christians because they were in a different religious communion, and therefore even outside the jurisdiction of the Inquisition.

The punishment of crimes belongs to civil magistrates only insofar as those crimes are contrary to political ends, public peace, and human justice; but coercion with respect to those acts that are opposed to religion and the salvation of the soul is essentially a function of the spiritual power [the power of the Church], so that the authority to make use of temporal penalties for the purposes of such correction must have been assigned in particular to this spiritual power.

— Francisco Suárez, Defensio Fidei Catholicae adversus Anglicanae Sectae Errores

In short, the Church reserved for the Clergy the right to judge the religious conscience of souls to determine who was a Heretic and how to deal with them judicially (reserving the most severe penalties for repeat heretics or those who admitted to being apostates publicly), while the State did not have such Prerogatives by themselves, but by the grace of the true Church of Christ (the Holy See), which also did not consider it morally acceptable to interfere with the conscience of non-Christians that lacked of Baptism, these having to be respected in their condition as natural non-Christians (according to Jus gentium and Natural law) and to have the freedom to profess their religion among their communities (such as the Ghettos) as long as they do not proselytize what the Church understands as false religions whose expansion would endanger Salvation in Christianity (the Church then leaning towards defending Catholic Unity, which involved religious Uniformism at a political level, and so Catholic political supremacy in societies with a Catholic majority).

=== Late modern pre-Conciliar teaching ===
Following the French Revolution, the Papacy had found itself in a bitter clash against liberalism and revolutionary ideas: harsh anti-clerical measures such as the Civil Constitution of the Clergy had drawn harsh condemnation from the Holy See. The Magisterium was particularly concerned with the rise of indifferentism and relativism and the ideas of religious pluralism and freedom of conscience were seen as expression of both and were strongly rejected by several Pontiffs. Thus, the Catholic Church condemned religious freedom (as how was defined the concept by Liberal philosophy) as a heresy during the Papacy of Pius IX with the encyclical Quanta cura, and this condemnation was reaffirmed with the Syllabus of Errors (a compendium of heretical propositions condemned by the Magisterium of the Church). Both condemnations were a continuation of a long series of reactionary condemnations against the Modernist Heresy and Liberal Theology that had arisen since the end of the 18th Century, in which was relevant the opposition of the Church to the "philosophical innovations" of the Enlightenment (as well as to the secular States that emerged from the Atlantic Revolutions) under the argument that political Liberalism, through the right to Freedom of worship, encouraged religious Indifference and forced Secularization that violated the political duties of Catholic societies to defend religious practice and Christian values in the public sphere (reducing religious life to a purely private matter, which was considered to endanger Salvation in Christianity and would only lead to Dechristianization through an increase in non-practicing Catholics), as well as for violating the socio-political rights of the Church in the face of the Anticlerical policies of the Secularists (who also sought to promote religious Minorities and the expansion of Irreligious population, as well as trying to convince the civil power to intervene against the ecclesiastical jurisdiction to increase the power of the state and seize church properties).

In this context of hostility between Catholics and Liberals in politics due to irreconcilable differences about Philosophy of Law, the Church would strongly condemn the right to Religious Freedom, but only as was formulated by liberal ideologues such concept (being open a possible acceptance in the future under different definitions), which was understood under the heretical proposition that "all religions (or all Christian confessions) are equally true and valid" on which liberal jurists based their definition of Religious Freedom. However, this never implied that the Church sought to deny the rights of people who were by birth non-Catholic people (because in the eyes of Natural Law and Ius gentium, they had a right to accept or reject Catholic Doctrine according to the good faith of their hearts), only to affirm that, as a consequence of the Catholic Faith being considered the only true religion, the rest of the religious positions by Logic couldn't have the same rights as the Catholic faith in the political order (if and only if the political society confessed the Catholic faith, so that being ruled by a Catholic ruler), arguing that error has no rights, and so the Church sought to call on Catholic Rulers (in a historical context where most governments still were confessional States) to not alter those historical relations of Catholic supremacy in the political sphere, because for the Holy See, Rulers with a sincere Catholic faith had a duty to condemn the Separation of Church and State (as understood by liberals) as a heresy, and not be badly influenced by liberal preaching arguing that the abolition of the privileges of the Catholic Church was necessary to achieve "public peace" (that there would be no political division in the state if the political differences between confessionalities were no longer recognized, aspiring to equalize them all before the law). Leo XIII, Pius XI and Pius XII, while reiterating traditional Catholic teaching, had also argued that "every man in the State may follow the will of God and, from a consciousness of duty and free from every obstacle, obey His commands" and that "laws which impede this profession and practice of Faith are against natural law". John XXIII had made a distinction between "error as such" and the person in error, who preserves his dignity.

== Vatican II and religious freedom ==
=== Third session (1964) ===
The debate on a separate Declaration on Religious Liberty was held on September 23 – September 25, as promised by Pope Paul the year before. However, in October an attempt was made by the Curial party to return this declaration to review by a special commission, which contained many hostile members and was outside the jurisdiction of the Pontifical Council for Promoting Christian Unity. Protest by bishops to Pope Paul resulted in the declaration staying under Unity with a different working commission which reviewed and amended it.

=== Fourth session (1965) ===
This re-revised text was approved by the council on October 25, with only minor amendments allowed afterward (including some disliked by Murray). The final vote was taken and the declaration was promulgated at the end of council on December 7, 1965. The claim by some that this overwhelming majority was due to intense lobbying by the reformist wing of Council Fathers among those prelates who initially had reservations or even objections.

== Traditionalist reception ==
=== Society of Saint Pius X ===
The Society of Saint Pius X (SSPX) rejects in particular point 2 of the Dignitatis Humanae (taken up again in no. 2108 of the Catechism of the Catholic Church) which states: "The right to religious liberty is neither a moral license to adhere to error, nor a supposed right to error, but rather a natural right of the human person to civil liberty, i.e., immunity, within just limits, from external constraint in religious matters by political authorities. This natural right ought to be acknowledged in the juridical order of society in such a way that it constitutes a civil right."

The SSPX's claims its doctrine comes from the teachings of Pius XII and Leo XIII. They claim that Pope Pius IX, in his encyclical Quanta cura (1864), while admitting the tolerance of error on the part of public authorities, stated that the right to freedom of public expression and dissemination could not be recognized for those religions that did not serve the truth. They also state that Leo XIII, in his encyclical Libertas, explained that a false religion has no right to spread.

Archbishop Marcel Lefebvre cited Libertas as one of the fundamental reasons for his difficulties with the Second Vatican Council. It remains a focus for attacks from Traditionalists in the 21st century.

The Society of St. Pius X criticized how Dignitatis humanae approached religious freedom with an argument from history:

The saints have never hesitated to break idols, destroy their temples, or legislate against pagan or heretical practices. The Church – without ever forcing anyone to believe or be baptized – has always recognized its right and duty to protect the faith of her children and to impede, whenever possible, the public exercise and propagation of false cults. To accept the teaching of Vatican II is to grant that, for two millennia, the popes, saints, Fathers and Doctors of the Church, bishops, and Catholic kings have constantly violated the natural rights of men without anyone in the Church noticing. Such a thesis is as absurd as it is impious.

The Vatican's position that the SSPX must acknowledge Dignitatis humanae and Nostra aetate as authoritative remained as of April 2017 a key point of difference between the two.

=== Interpretation in continuity ===
The interpretation of the document, according to the Hermeneutics of Continuity, is that the Second Vatican Council's defense of religious freedom, along with other concepts commonly associated with the Charter of Human Rights (the latter developed according to liberal ideologies condemned by the Magisterium of the Church), is a defense that is always given as long as they are subordinated to natural law and the common good, not understanding them as subjective rights that allow a false right to believe in error (maintaining the condemnations in Quanta cura and the Syllabus against indifferentism as well as the social teaching for Catholic Rulers to protect political Catholicism), but as objective rights where there are duties of every State to protect the rights of the human person to believe in the true religion.

Thus, it is inferred that Dignitatis Humanae considers implicit that a Christian State has commitments to safeguard the salvation of souls (aspiring to Catholic unity) and to avoid apostasies or the spread of heresy. Therefore, its emphasis of the document (already assuming the above a priori in the Tradition of the Church) aims to make explicit that a secular Government, to be legitimate in view of the eternal law and the natural order (even if it were a non-Christian State), should allow the right for all human person to be able to search for the true religion, instead of imposing Secularism or State Atheism on the one hand, as well as imposing Forced Conversions or a Sacerdotal State on the other hand.

On the contradictions some see between Dignitatis humanae and Pope Pius IX's Syllabus of Errors, the theologian Brian Mullady has argued that:

the religious freedom condemned in the Syllabus of Errors refers to religious freedom looked at from the point of view of the action of the intellect, or freedom respecting the truth; whereas the freedom of religion guaranteed and encouraged by Dignitatis humanae refers to religious freedom looked at from the point of view of the action of the will in morals. In other words, those who see in these different expressions a change in teaching are committing the fallacy of univocity of terms in logic. The terms "freedom" refer to two very different acts of the soul.

== International Theological Commission, 2019 ==
On 21 March 2019, Pope Francis approved the publication of a document produced by the International Theological Commission called "Religious freedom for the good of all: Theological approach to contemporary challenges". It attempts to update Dignitatis humanae in the light of the increasing diversity and secularization seen since the Council: "the cultural complexity of today's civil order".

== See also ==
- Relations between the Catholic Church and the state
- Christian state
- Res publica Christiana
- Quanta cura
- Mirari vos
