= Latitudinarian =

Term referring to some Anglican theologians

Latitudinarians, also called latitude men, were initially a group of 17th-century English theologians – clerics and academics – from the University of Cambridge who were moderate Anglicans (members of the Church of England). In particular, they believed that adhering to very specific doctrines, liturgical practices, and church organizational forms, as did the Puritans, was not necessary and could be harmful: "The sense that one had special instructions from God made individuals less amenable to moderation and compromise, or to reason itself." Thus, the latitudinarians supported a broad-based (sensu lato, with "laxitude") Protestantism. They were later referred to as broad church (see also Inclusivism).

Examples of the latitudinarian philosophy underlying the theology were found among the Cambridge Platonists and Sir Thomas Browne in his Religio Medici. Additionally, the term latitudinarian has been applied to ministers of the Scottish Episcopal Church who were educated at the Episcopal-sympathizing universities at Aberdeen and St Andrews, and who broadly subscribed to the beliefs of their moderate Anglican English counterparts.

In the Catholic Church, latitudinarianism was condemned in the 19th-century document Quanta cura and the Syllabus of Errors. Pope Pius IX taught that, with its emphasis on the freedom to discard traditional Christian doctrines and dogmas, latitudinarianism threatened to undermine the church.

== See also ==
- Anglo-Catholic
- Bangorian Controversy
- Liberal Christianity
- John Tillotson

== Sources ==
- Abbey, Charles J.; Overton, John H. (1896). "Ch. 4 & 5". The English Church in the Eighteenth Century (2nd ed.).
