= Jamdudum cernimus =

1861 declaration by Pope Pius IX

Jamdudum cernimus is a declaration in the form of an allocution given by Pope Pius IX on 18 March 1861. It has been cited as a source for the last and most famous statement of the Syllabus of Errors, that of the irreconcilability between Christian civilization and modern liberal civilization.

In this allocution, the Pope expressly distinguishes between true and false civilization, and declares that history witnesses to the fact that the Holy See has always been the protector and patron of all genuine civilization; and he affirms that, if a system designed to de-Christianize the world be called a system of progress and civilization, he can never hold out the hand of peace to such a system. According to the words of this allocution, then, it is evident that the eightieth thesis of the Syllabus applies to false progress and false Liberalism and not to honest pioneer-work seeking to open out new fields to human activity.

The Pope condemned the proposition that "The injustice of an act when successful inflicts no injury on the sanctity of right."

The interpretation of the condemned statements of the Syllabus was intended to take place in light of the contents of previous statements such as this one; hence the reference to other documents after each proposition.
