= Juan Donoso Cortés =

Spanish writer and politician (1809–1853)

The Most Excellent Juan Donoso Cortés Marqués de Valdegamas OIC LH TOSD
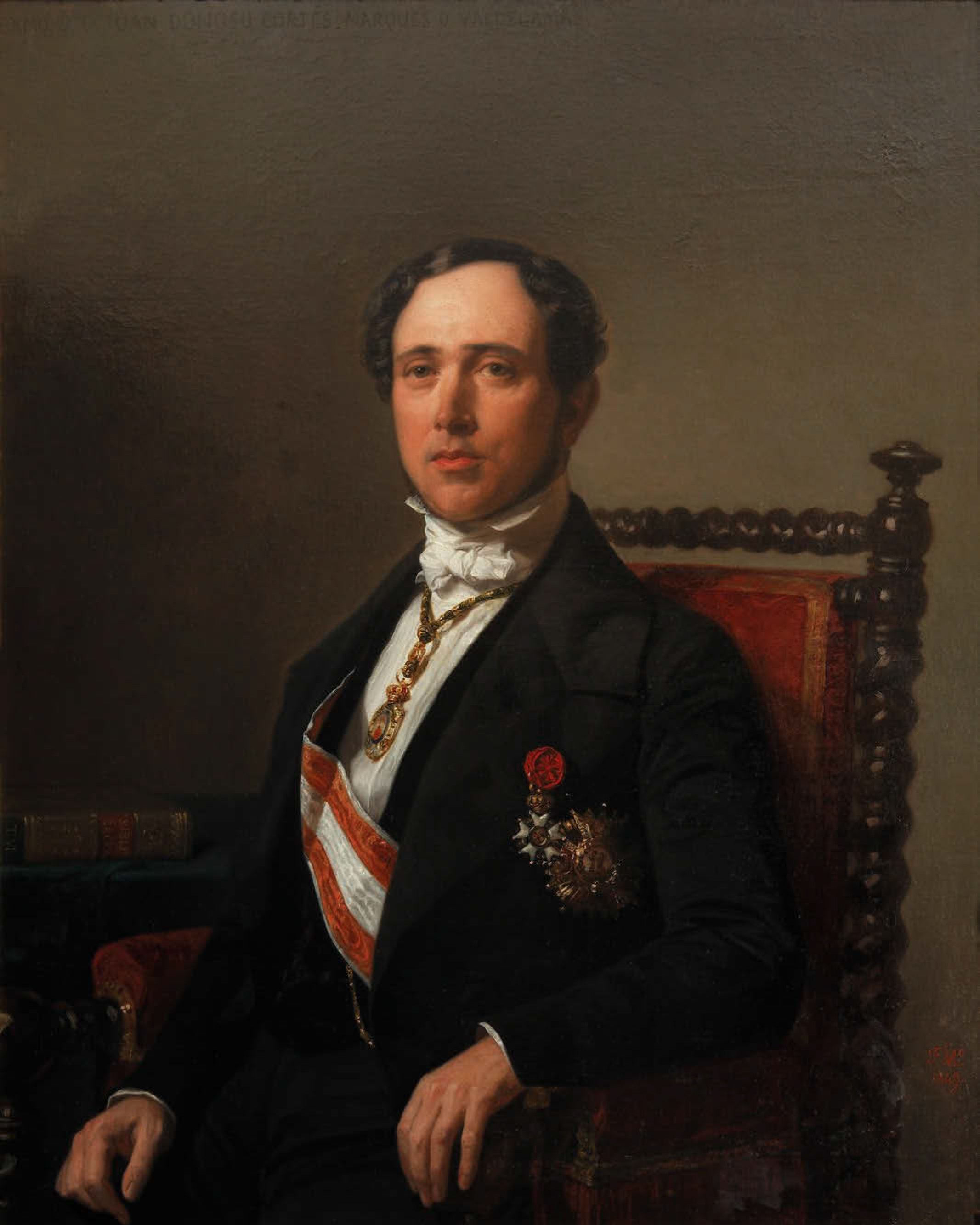
- Portrait by Federico Madrazo, 1849
- Born: Juan Francisco María de la Salud Donoso Cortés y Fernández Canedo; 6 May 1809; Valle de la Serena, Spain
- Died: 3 May 1853 (aged 43); Paris, French Empire

Philosophical work
- Era: 19th-century philosophy
- Region: Western Philosophy: Spanish philosophy
- School: Spanish Traditionalism; Counter-Enlightenment; Ultramontanism
- Main interests: Political theory, Political theology
- Notable works: Essays on Catholicism, Liberalism, and Socialism

Seat R of the Real Academia Española
- In office 16 April 1848 – 3 May 1853
- Preceded by: Javier de Burgos
- Succeeded by: Rafael María Baralt

Juan Francisco María de la Salud Donoso Cortés y Fernández Canedo, marqués de Valdegamas (6 May 1809 – 3 May 1853) was a Spanish writer, diplomat, politician, and Catholic political theologian.

== Biography ==
=== Early life ===
Cortés was born at Valle de la Serena (Extremadura) on 6 May 1809. His father, D. Pedro Donoso Cortés was a lawyer and landowner, and a descendant of the conquistador Hernán Cortés. His mother, Maria Elena Fernández-Canedo was a provincial heiress. During his youth, Juan Donoso was tutored by the liberal Antonio Beltran in Latin, French, and other subjects required for entrance to a university. At 11, possibly due to issues at home, Juan Donoso left to study at the University of Salamanca. He only remained there a year before leaving to study at the Colegio de San Pedro de Caceres. In 1823, at age 14, he entered the University of Seville to study law, and would remain there until 1828. It was here that Donoso Cortés first encountered philosophy; he fell under the influence of liberal and traditionalist thinkers such as John Locke and Louis de Bonald.

Donoso returned home to work at his father's law practice for a couple of years. At this time, he continued his eclectic reading habits. In October 1829, Cortés was offered a professorship in aesthetics and politics at the Colegio de San Pedro de Caceres. He criticized medieval feudalism but defended the Papacy and the Crusades, which he believed engendered vitality into European civilization. Influenced by the rationalism prevalent in Spain following upon the French invasions, he ardently embraced the principles of Liberalism and fell under the influence of Jean-Jacques Rousseau, whom he later characterized as "the most eloquent of sophists".

=== Entry into politics and journalism ===
Cortés married Teresa Carrasco in 1830; however, their marriage lasted only five years, with the death of Teresa after the birth of their only child, Maria. It was also at this time that Juan Donoso entered politics along with his brother-in-law. He entered politics as an ardent liberal under the influence of Manuel José Quintana. After the death of King Ferdinand VII, Donoso, along with most of Spain's liberals, backed the late king's fourth wife, Maria Christina, and her claim to the throne of Spain. They were opposed by Ferdinand's clerical and conservative brother Carlos, and his conservative supporters, who were known as Carlists. In 1832, Donoso wrote a memorandum to King Ferdinand defending female succession as being in line with the king's Pragmatic Sanction of 1830. For his efforts, the new queen regent would appoint Donoso to a position in the Secretariat of State.

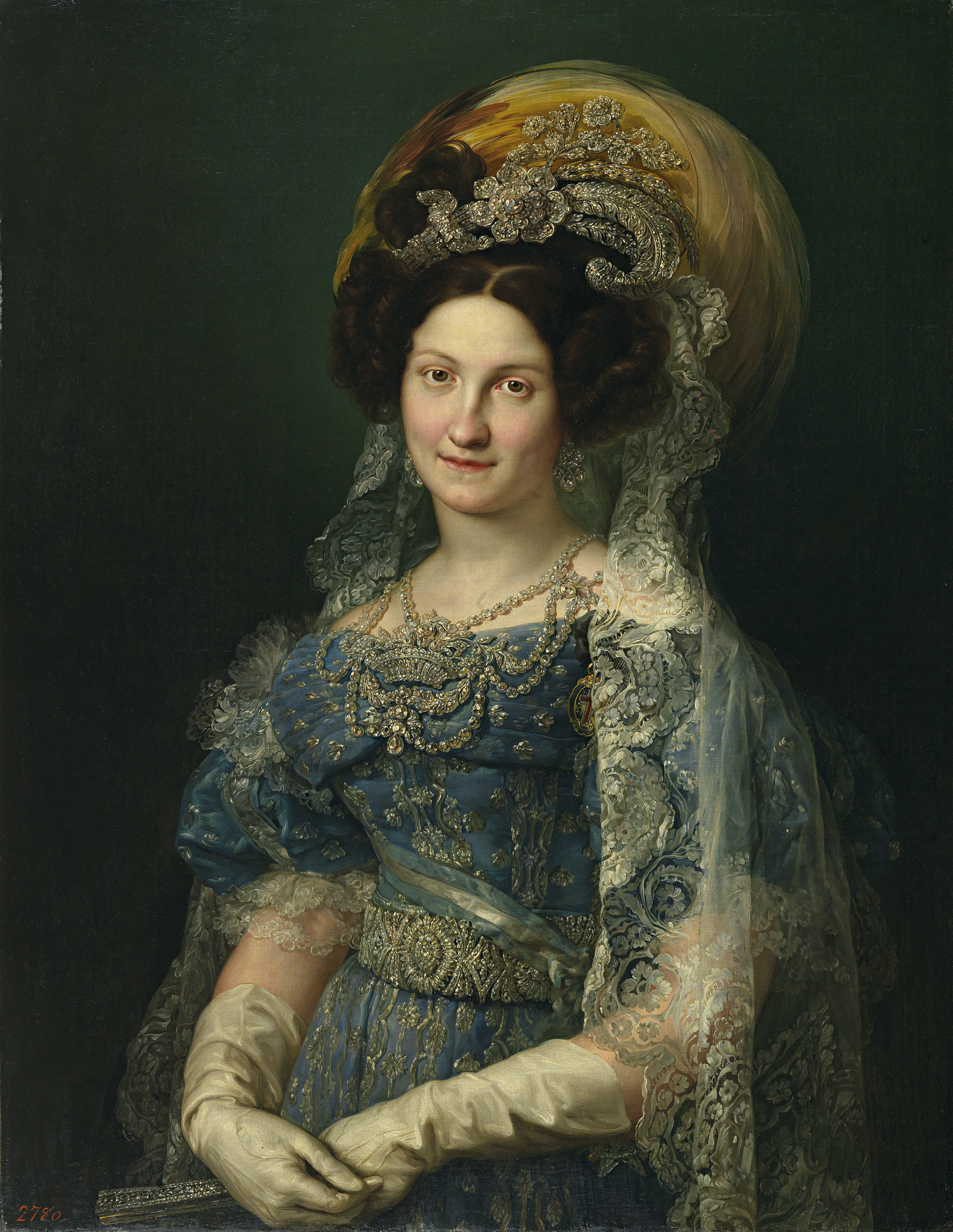
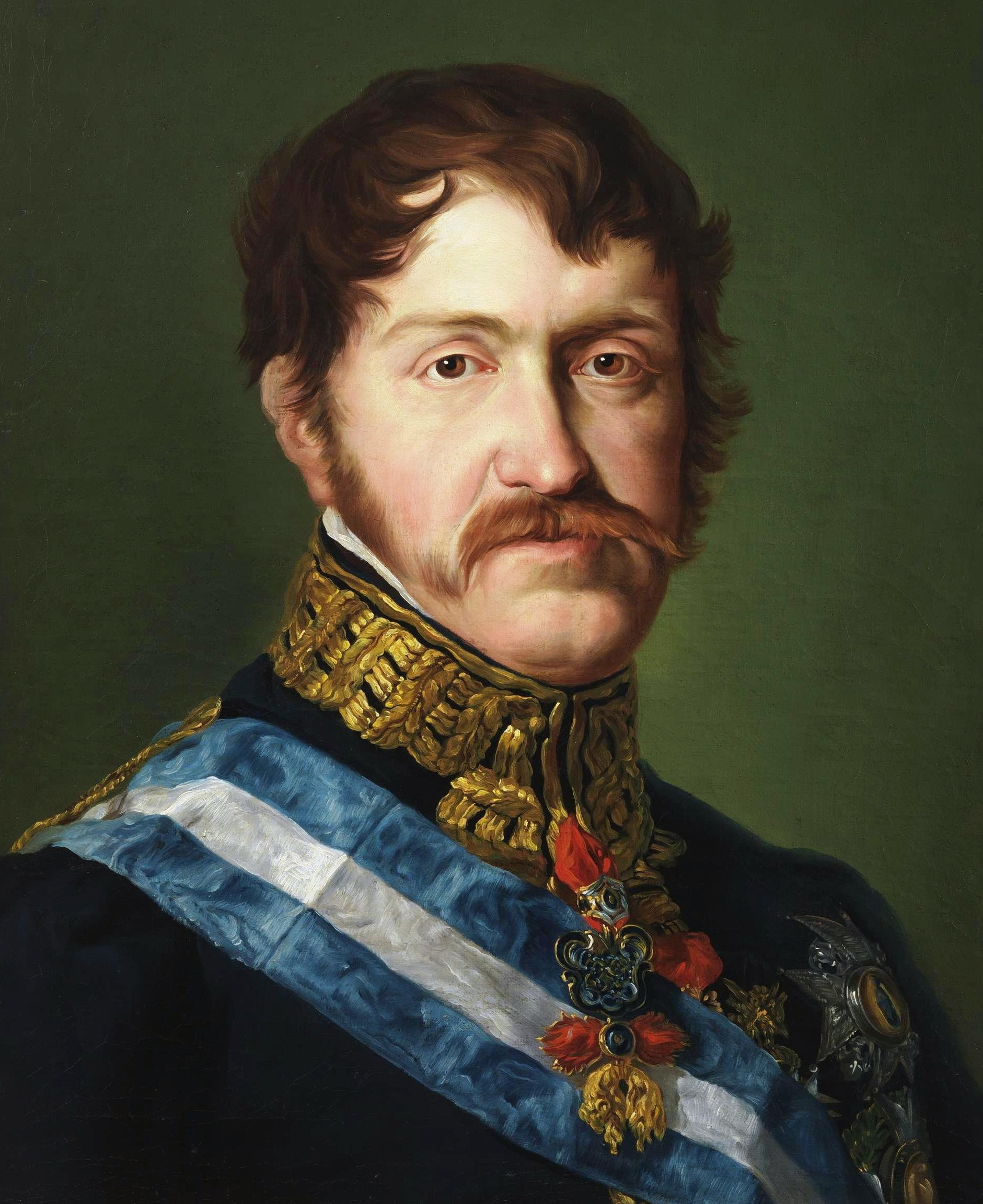
Donoso backed María Cristina's (left), wife of the late King Ferdinand VII, succession to the Spanish throne over the late King's brother Carlos (right).

The death of King Ferdinand in 1833 precipitated the First Carlist War. Donoso protested the massacre of friars by anti-clerical liberals in Madrid in July 1834 in a memo to Maria Christina.

Donoso's views began to shift after the 1836 rising at La Granja, where soldiers in the royal palace forced Maria Cristina to reinstitute the liberal Constitution of 1812. At this time Donoso was appointed as a cabinet secretary and elected to the Cortes as a member of the liberal Moderate Party, which represented bourgeois interests and supported a constitutional monarchy. At this time, he gave a series of lectures for the party, A Defense of Representative Government, where he lauded representative government and rationalism, but at the same time defended dictatorship as sometimes being a necessary evil.

The period between 1837 and 1840 saw the nadir of Donoso's journalistic career, writing for various publications such as El Correo Nacional, El Porvenir, and El Piloto. His drift into conservatism continued during this time; Donoso attacked Victor Hugo's depiction of Mary Stuart and argued in favour of the use of rich articles in religious rites. His most extensive article during this time, "Classicism and Romanticism", written in El Correo Nacional in August or September 1838, urged a synthesis between classicist and romantic art forms. Donoso's articles brought him a great deal of notoriety and condemnation, with 65 members of the Cortes accusing Donoso of being subversive.

Donoso recognized the power of the press and sought to influence public discussion through his publications, yet he was also one of the sharpest critics of the press and the freedom of the press. He believed that journalism was an almost sacred vocation, but that this vocation was often abused and was used to spread mindless chatter and gossip. He was critical of the use of the press to spread revolutionary, socialist, and anti-Christian ideas. Donoso went as far as to believe that freedom of the press itself was the result of the abandonment of Christian moral principles: editors were a new priesthood devoted to furthering the revolution and the authority of Christian doctrine was replaced with endless discussion. He was also critical of the use of the press by governments to achieve centralization and bureaucratization.

=== Shift to conservatism ===
By the end of the First Carlist War in 1839, Donoso had become disillusioned with liberalism, rationalism, and the bourgeoisie. He became something of a recluse and rarely left the royal palace. With the fall of the regency of Maria Christina, Donoso went into exile with the former Queen-regent; from March 1841 to the autumn of 1843, Donoso spent almost all of his time in Paris. During this time he began a history of the regency of Maria Christina; however, it would never be finished. During this time, Donoso came more strongly under the influence of the French traditionalists Joseph de Maistre and Louis de Bonald.

Donoso returned to Spain in late 1843 and played a key role in granting majority status to Queen Isabella II, ending the regency of Baldomero Espartero. For his services to the crown, Donoso was made private secretary to the young Queen, and he was raised to the peerage. Shortly after, in May 1844, General Narváez came to power as prime minister. Donoso's liberalism saw a brief upsurge with the early reforms of Pope Pius IX, who appointed Pellegrino Rossi to be prime minister of the Papal States.

The Revolutions of 1848, along with the assassination of Rossi and the death of Donoso's pious Carlist brother Pedro, brought an end to any trace of liberalism in Donoso's thinking. In January 1849, Donoso gave a speech in the Cortes, "On Dictatorship," defending the actions of General Narvaez in suppressing any traces of revolutionary activity in Spain. Donoso spoke out vociferously against the chaos he saw unfolding across Europe in the Cortes; he denounced socialism as the result of the erosion of Christian morality and atheism. Donoso would later become a sharp critic of Narvaez, and his speeches criticising him in the Cortes would lead to Narvaez's resignation. During this time Donoso briefly served as ambassador to Berlin.

=== Later life ===
In 1851, Donoso was appointed as the Spanish ambassador to France, presenting his credentials to the court of President, and later Emperor, Louis Napoleon, who would reign under the title of Napoleon III. Donoso was initially a confidant of Napoleon, and may have helped finance his coup. However, as time went on, it became clear that Donoso and Napoleon did not share a common intellectual purpose. Still, Donoso worked to obtain international recognition for the new regime and he represented Queen Isabella II at the Emperor's marriage to the Spanish countess Eugénie de Montijo.

Donoso's life took on a newfound piety during this time: he went on pilgrimage, wore a hair shirt, volunteered with the Society of St. Vincent de Paul, visited slums and prisons, and donated much of his wealth to the poor. He also spent much of time writing in opposition to the Liberal French Catholics and their leader Bishop Dupanloup.

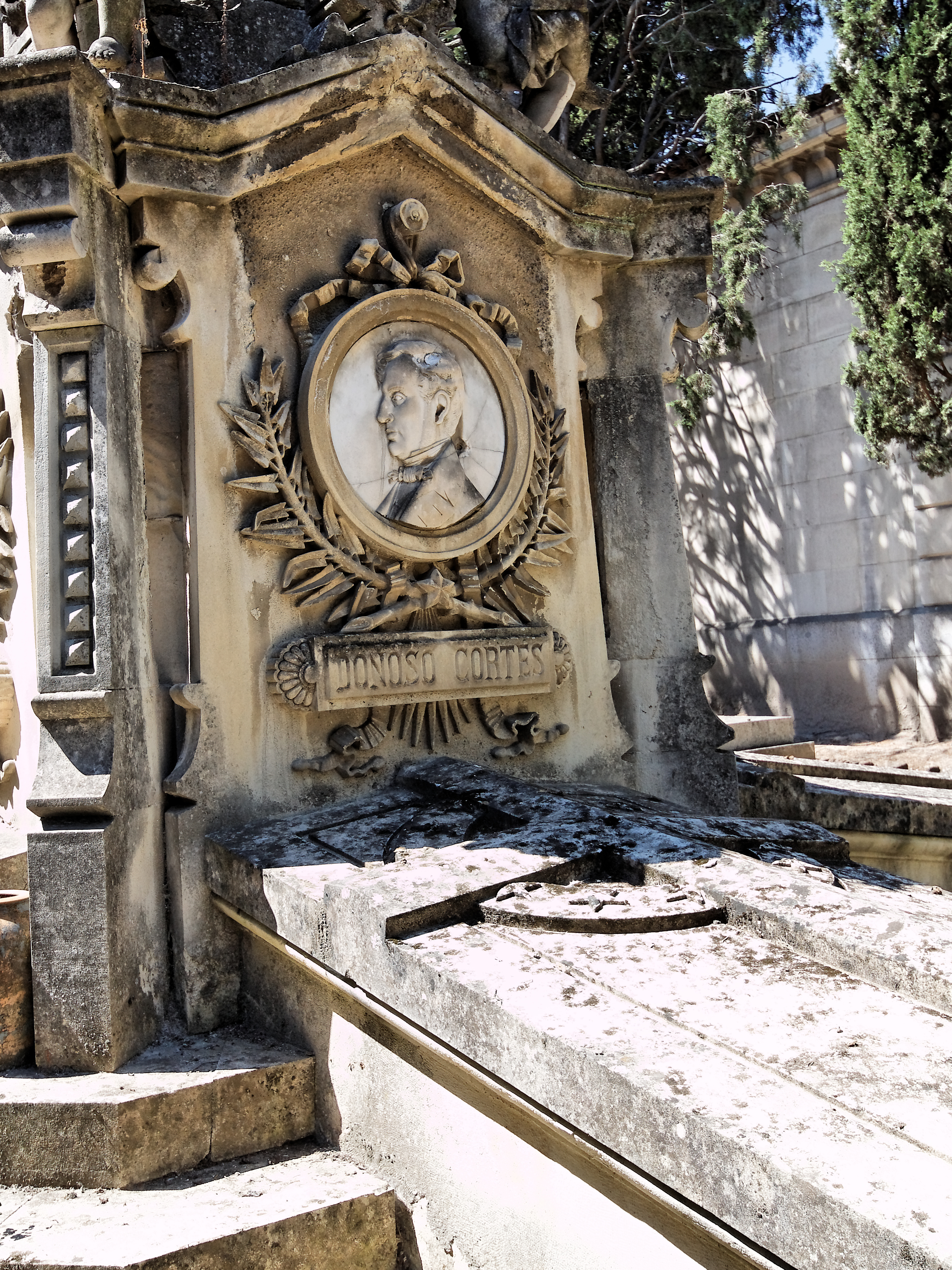
The grave of Juan Donoso Cortés in the church of San Isidro el Real in Madrid, Spain.

It was during this time that Donoso Cortés issued his Ensayo Sobre el Catolicismo, el Liberalismo, y el Socialismo Considerados en sus Principios Fundamentales (1851), or Essays on Catholicism, Liberalism, and Socialism, Considered in their Fundamental Principles, the work for which he is most well-known. It was written at the insistence of Louis Veuillot, who was an intimate friend of Juan Donoso. The work placed Cortés in the first rank of Catholic apologists and made him a defender of Ultramontanism. It is an exposition of the impotence of all human systems of philosophy to solve the problem of human destiny and of the absolute dependence of humanity upon the Catholic Church for its social and political salvation. He excoriates liberalism as the bridge that ultimately leads to atheistic socialism.

During his last years, he also engaged in a series of correspondences that developed his thought further; firstly with the former Queen regent Maria Christina; with Cardinal Fornari, the papal nuncio to France; and Atanazy Raczyński, a Polish nobleman and Prussian ambassador to Spain, who was a close friend of Donoso. He also briefly engaged in a correspondence with Pope Pius IX, and warned the pope about the continuing threat from Gallicanism and democracy. Many of Donoso's ideas would be incorporated into Pius's encyclical Quanta Cura and its attached Syllabus of Errors.

Juan Donoso Cortés died in the Spanish Embassy in Paris on 3 May 1853. His funeral was held in the Church of Saint Phillipe du Roule in Paris, where he would be interred. His remains were transferred to Madrid on 11 May 1900, along with the remains of Goya, Moratin, and Melendez Valdes. His remains are currently interred in the pantheon of the royal cemetery of San Isidro el Real.

Donoso Cortés's works were collected in five volumes at Madrid (1854–1855) under the editorship of Gavino Tejado.

== Influence ==
In his work Political Theology (1922), political philosopher Carl Schmitt devotes large portions of his final chapter ("On the Counterrevolutionary Philosophy of the State") to Donoso Cortés, praising him for recognizing the importance of decision and of the concept of sovereignty. Schmitt also credited Donoso's Discourse on Dictatorship with initiating the demise of the progressive notion of history.

== Bibliography ==
- Obras de Don Juan Donoso Cortés, Marqués de Valdegamas, Ordenadas y Precedidas de una Noticia Biográfica por Gavino Tejado, Impr. de Tejado, 1854-1855:
  - Vol I.
  - Vol. II.
  - Vol. III.
  - Vol. IV.
  - Vol. V.
- Obras Completas de Donoso Cortés, Juan, Marqués de Valdegamas, 1809-1853, 2 Vols., Editorial Católica, 1946.
- Obras Completas. Edición, Introducción y Notas de Carlos Valverde, 2 Vols., Editorial Católica, 1970.

=== English translations of Donoso Cortés ===
- Essay on Catholicism, Liberalism and Socialism, Considered in their Fundamental Principles, tr. Madeleine Vinton Goddard. Philadelphia: J.B. Lippincott & Co., 1862.
  - Essays on Catholicism, Liberalism and Socialism, Considered in their Fundamental Principles, tr. William McDonald. Dublin: M.H. Gill & Son, 1879.
  - Essays on Catholicism, Liberalism and Socialism: Considered in Their Fundamental Principles, Cornell University Library, 2010.
- In Menczer, Béla, 1962. Catholic Political Thought, 1789-1848. University of Notre Dame Press.
  - "The Church, the State, and Revolution," pp. 160–176.
  - "Socialism," pp. 177–182.
- On Order: Two Addresses Newly Translated into English by Juan Donoso Cortes. Plutarch Press, 1989.
- Selected Works of Juan Donoso Cortes: Contributions in Political Science. Praeger, 2000.
- Donoso Cortes: Readings in Political Theory, R.A. Herrera ed., Sapientia Press of Ave Maria University, 2007.
- Letter to Cardinal Fornari on the Errors of Our Time, [n.d.]

== Sources ==
- Herrera, R. A., ed. (2007). Donoso Cortes: Readings in Political Theory. Translated by McNamara, Vincent; Schwartz, Michael. Ave Maria, FL: Sapientia Press. ISBN 978-1-932589-48-1.
- This article incorporates text from a publication now in the public domain: Herbermann, Charles, ed. (1913). "Juan Francesco Maria de la Saludad Donoso Cortés". Catholic Encyclopedia. New York: Robert Appleton Company.
