= American Ecclesiastical Review =

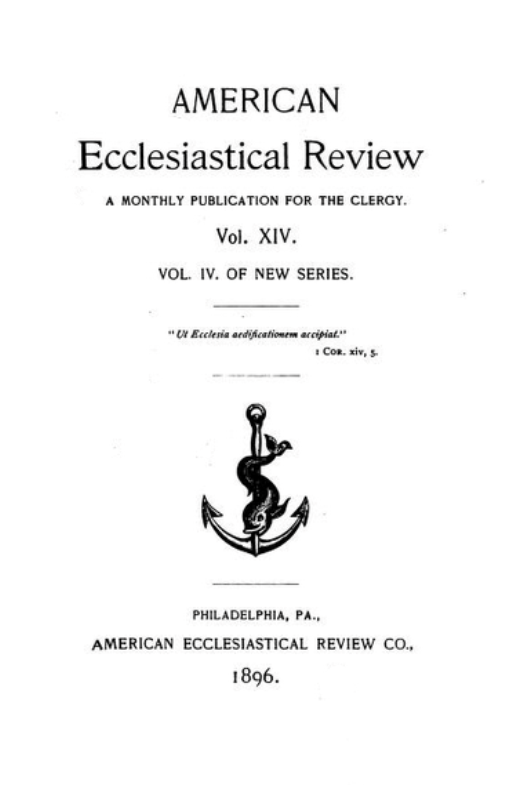
- Volume 14, 1896
- Discipline: Catholic studies
- Language: English
- Edited by: Joseph Clifford Fenton

Publication details
- History: 1889–1975
- Publisher: Catholic University of America

Standard abbreviations
- ISO 4: Am. Eccles. Rev.

Indexing
- ISSN: 0002-8274
- OCLC no.: 5731565

The American Ecclesiastical Review was an American Catholic journal dedicated to theological scholarship.

== History ==
The journal was established in 1889 and published in Philadelphia until 1927. It was then housed at the Catholic University of America until it ceased publication in 1975. It was edited by Joseph Clifford Fenton, a peritus at the Second Vatican Council.
