= John Courtney Murray =

American Catholic priest, philosopher, and theologian (1904–1967)

The Reverend Dr. John Courtney Murray SJ
- Portrait of Murra
- Born: September 12, 1904; New York City, U.S.
- Died: August 16, 1967 (aged 62); New York City, U.S.

Academic background
- Education: Boston College; Gregorian University

Academic work
- Institutions: Ateneo de Manila, Jesuit theologate Woodstock, Maryland
- Main interests: Theology
- Notable works: We Hold These Truths
- Notable ideas: Dignitatis humanae

John Courtney Murray SJ (September 12, 1904 – August 16, 1967) was an American Jesuit priest and theologian who was especially known for his efforts to reconcile Catholicism and religious pluralism and particularly focused on the relationship between religious freedom and the institutions of a democratically structured modern state.

During the Second Vatican Council, he played a key role in persuading the assembly of the Catholic bishops to adopt the council's ground-breaking Declaration on Religious Liberty, Dignitatis humanae.

== Early life and education ==
John Courtney Murray was born in New York City on September 12, 1904. In 1920, he entered the New York province of the Society of Jesus after attending Xavier High School. He studied Classics and Philosophy at Boston College. He obtained his bachelor's and master's degrees in 1926 and 1927, respectively. After graduation, he traveled to the Philippines, where he taught Latin and English literature at the Ateneo de Manila.

== Career ==
In 1930, Murray returned to the United States. He was ordained a Roman Catholic priest in 1933. He pursued further studies at the Gregorian University in Rome and in 1937 completed a doctorate in sacred theology.

After his return from Rome to the United States, just before the beginning of World War II, he joined the Jesuit theologate in Woodstock, Maryland and taught Catholic trinitarian theology. In 1940, Murray still fully supported the Catholic doctrine that there was no salvation outside the Church.

In 1941, he was named editor of the Jesuit journal Theological Studies. He held both positions until his death.

As representative of the United States Conference of Catholic Bishops and consultant to the religious affairs section of the Allied High Commission, he helped draft and promote the 1943 Declaration on World Peace, an interfaith statement of principles for postwar reconstruction. He successfully promoted a close constitutional arrangement between the restored German state and the Church, which included the sharing of tax revenue with the churches.

By 1944, Murray's endorsement of full co-operation with other theists led many Catholics to complain that he endangered American Catholic faith, which then recommended minimal co-operation with non-Catholics for fear that lay Catholic faith would be weakened.

Similarly, Murray advocated religious freedom and pluralism as defined and protected by the First Amendment of the US Constitution, which contradicted Catholic doctrines of church-and-state relations before Vatican II.

"Pluralism, therefore, implies disagreement and dissension within the community. But it also implies a community within which there must be agreement and consensus."

=== Postwar reconstruction ===
His background and training suggest a heavily theoretical bent, but Murray became a leading public figure, and his work dealt primarily with the tensions between religion and public life. His best-known book, We Hold These Truths: Catholic Reflections on the American Proposition (1960), collects a number of his essays on such topics.

In 1951 to 1952, after a lectureship at Yale University, he collaborated on a project with Robert Morrison MacIver of Columbia University to assess academic freedom and religious education in American public universities. Ultimately, the proposal argued for public aid to private schools and for sympathetic exposure of religious faiths in public schools. The project was both nationally influential and personally formative, as it deepened Murray's understanding of and esteem for American constitutional law.

In his increasingly public role, several American bishops consulted Murray on legal issues such as censorship and birth control. He argued against what he saw as the reactionary and coercive practices of some Catholic bishops and instead advocated participation in substantive public debate, which he suggested offered a better appeal to public virtue. Instead of civic coercion, he argued, presenting moral opinions in the context of public discourse enabled Americans to deepen their moral commitments and to safeguard the "genius" of American freedoms.

From 1958 to 1962, he served at the Center for the Study of Democratic Institutions and applied just war criteria to Soviet-American relations.

Throughout the 1950s Murray promoted his ideas in Catholic journals where they received heavy criticism from the leading Catholic thinkers of the day. Msgr Fenton was the most prominent of those that opposed Murray as Murray's line was much closer to Americanism, which had been condemned by Leo XIII. Murray had the advantage of being friends with Clare Boothe Luce, the US ambassador to Italy and the second wife of Henry Luce, the prominent magazine magnate. Murray's ideas were featured in Henry Luce's Time magazine, most prominently on December 12, 1960, when Murray graced the cover in a feature about US Catholics and the State. Henry Luce was a prominent Republican and close friends with John Foster Dulles, the father of Avery Dulles, SJ, who was known to be sympathetic to Murray's theology and with CIA Director Allen Dulles, who was John's brother. The CIA then sought to use the news media to influence public opinion during the Cold War. Murray's liberal approach to religious liberty and the traditionally strong Catholic opposition to communism were useful in the global battle against communism, especially in Latin America and other Catholic strongholds. After his death in 1967, his obituary in Time declared that he had been responsible for incorporating the US secular doctrines of church-state separation and freedom of conscience in to the spiritual tradition of Roman Catholicism" despite the efforts of the "ultra conservative" faction in the Church.

=== Tensions with the Vatican, 1954 ===
By the late 1940s, Murray argued that Catholic teaching on church-and-state relations was inadequate to the "moral functioning" of contemporary peoples. The Anglo-American West, he claimed, had developed a fuller truth about human dignity, which was the responsibility of all citizens to assume "moral control" over their own religious beliefs and to wrest control from paternalistic states. That truth was an "intention of nature" or a new dictate of natural law philosophy.

Murray's claim that a "new moral truth" had emerged outside the Church led to conflict with Cardinal Alfredo Ottaviani, Pro-Secretary of the Vatican Holy Office. In 1954, the Vatican demanded for Murray to end both writing on religious freedom and publishing his two latest articles on the issue.

=== Second Vatican Council, 1963 ===
In spite of his silencing, Murray continued to write privately on religious liberties and submitted his works to Rome, all of which were rejected.

In 1963, he was invited to the second but not the first session of the Second Vatican Council in which he drafted the third and the fourth versions of a document on religious freedom.

In 1965, the document eventually became the council's endorsement of religious freedom Dignitatis humanae personae. He continued to write on the issue by claiming that the arguments offered by the final decree were inadequate even if the affirmation of religious freedom was unequivocal.

In 1966, prompted by the Vietnam War, he was appointed to serve on Lyndon B. Johnson's presidential commission, which reviewed Selective Service classifications. He supported the allowance of a classification for those opposed on moral grounds to some but not all wars, but that recommendation was not accepted by the Selective Service Administration.

Murray then turned to questions of how the Church might arrive at new theological doctrines. He argued that Catholics who arrived at new truths about God would have to do so in conversation "on a footing of equality" with non-Catholics and atheists. He suggested greater reforms, including a restructuring of the Church, which he saw as having overdeveloped its notion of authority and hierarchy at the expense of the bonds of love that had from the start defined the authentically Christian life.

== Death ==
In August 1967, Murray died of a heart attack in Queens, New York, one month before his 63rd birthday.
