= Syllabus of Errors =

1864 document issued by the Holy See

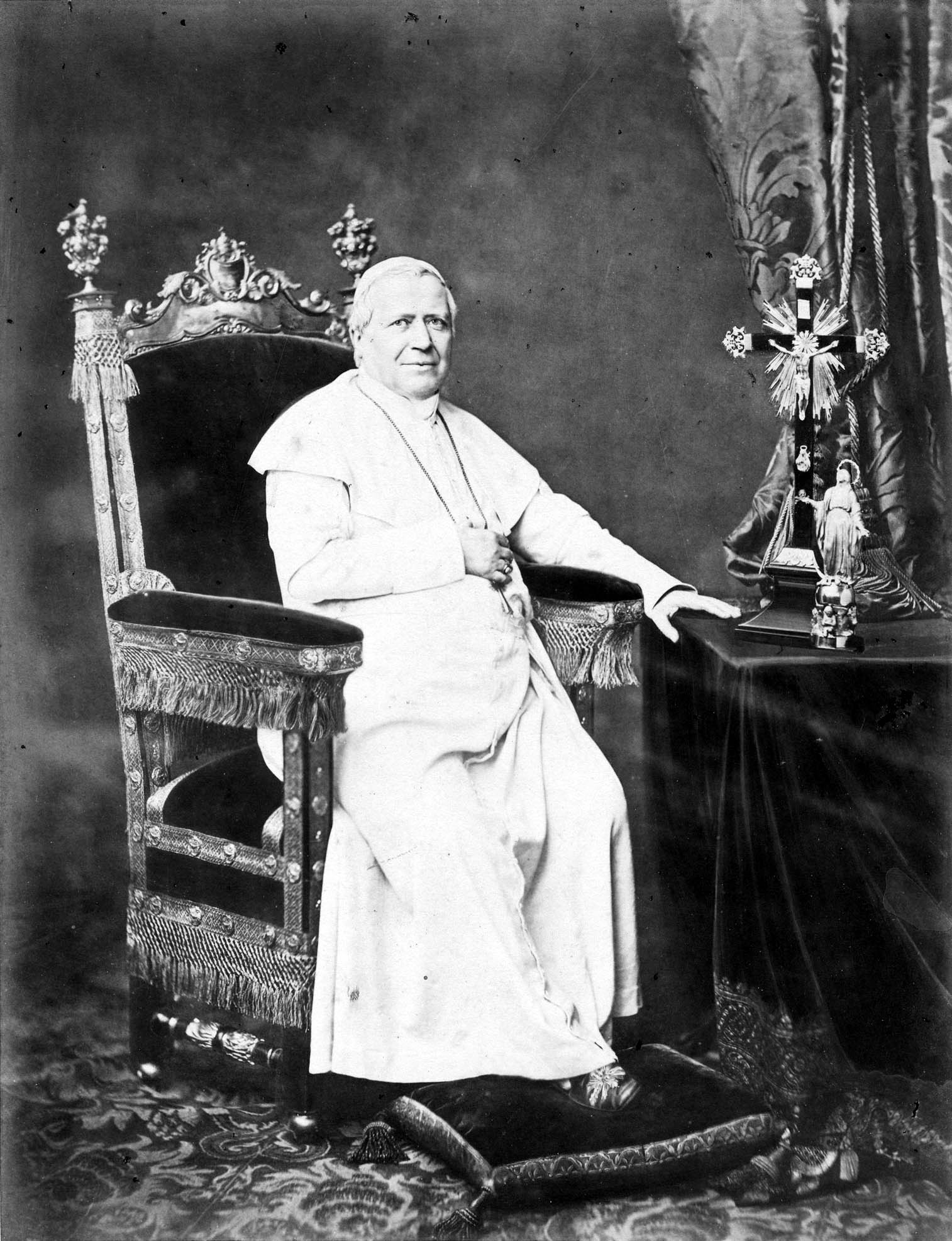
Pope Pius IX, c. 1864

The Syllabus of Errors (Latin: Syllabus errorum) is the name given to an index document issued by the Holy See under Pope Pius IX on 8 December 1864 at the same time as his encyclical letter Quanta cura. It collected a total of 80 propositions that the Pope considered to be current errors or heresies, pairing the briefest headings with references to the various documents where the actual teachings are found.

The documents referenced by the Syllabus were intended to be a rebuttal of liberalism, modernism, moral relativism, secularization, and the political emancipation of Europe from the tradition of Catholic monarchies but some relate to specific nations.

== Summary ==
A cover letter by Cardinal Antonelli notes that Pope Pius IX had ordered the creation of the list, in case some Bishops had not read all his recent allocutions, speeches or encyclicals.

The Syllabus is made up of phrases and paraphrases from earlier papal documents, along with index references to them, presenting a list of "condemned propositions". The Syllabus does not explain why each particular proposition is wrong, but cites the earlier document considering each subject. The ideas of Juan Donoso Cortés helped shape the content of the Syllabus.

The Syllabus is divided into ten sections on the following topics:

1. pantheism, naturalism, and absolute rationalism, #1–7
2. moderate rationalism, #8–14
3. indifferentism and latitudinarianism, #15–18
4. socialism, communism, secret societies, Bible societies, and liberal clerical societies, a general condemnation, unnumbered
5. the Catholic Church and its rights, #19–38 (defending temporal power in the Papal States, overthrown six years later)
6. civil society and its relationship to the Catholic Church, #39–55
7. natural and Christian ethics, #56–64
8. Christian marriage, #65–74
9. the civil power of the pope in the Papal States, #75–76
10. liberalism in every political form, #77–80.

=== Sources cited ===
The Syllabus cites a number of previous documents that had been written during Pius's papacy. These include: Qui pluribus, Maxima quidem, Singulari quadam, Tuas libenter, Multiplices inter, Quanto conficiamur, Noscitis, Nostis et nobiscum, Meminit unusquisque, Ad Apostolicae, Nunquam fore, Incredibili, Acerbissimum, Singularis nobisque, Multis gravibusque, Quibus quantisque, Quibus luctuosissimis, In consistoriali, Cum non sine, Cum saepe, Quanto conficiamur, Jamdudum cernimus, Novos et ante, Quibusque vestrum and Cum catholica.

== Reactions ==
=== Non-Catholics ===
In 1874, the British Leader of the Opposition William Gladstone published a tract entitled The Vatican Decrees in their Bearing on Civil Allegiance: A Political Expostulation, in which he said that after the Syllabus

no one can now become [Rome's] convert without renouncing his moral and mental freedom, and placing his civil loyalty and duty at the mercy of another.

=== Catholics ===
Catholic apologists such as Félix Dupanloup and John Henry Newman said that the Syllabus was widely misinterpreted by readers who did not have access to, or did not bother to check, the original documents of which it was a summary. The propositions listed had been condemned as erroneous opinions in the sense and context in which they originally occurred; without the original context, the document appeared to condemn a larger range of ideas than it actually did. Thus, it was asserted that no critical response to the Syllabus could be valid, if it did not take into account the cited documents and their context. Newman wrote:

The Syllabus then has no dogmatic force; it addresses us, not in its separate portions, but as a whole, and is to be received from the Pope by an act of obedience, not of faith, that obedience being shown by having recourse to the original and authoritative documents, (Allocutions and the like,) to which the Syllabus pointedly refers. Moreover, when we turn to those documents, which are authoritative, we find the Syllabus cannot even be called an echo of the Apostolic Voice; for, in matters in which wording is so important, it is not an exact transcript of the words of the Pope, in its account of the errors condemned, just as would be natural in what is an index for reference.

As the English Catholic historian E. E. Y. Hales explained, concerning item #77:

[T]he Pope is not concerned with a universal principle, but with the position in a particular state at a particular date. He is expressing his 'wonder and distress' (no more) that in a Catholic country (Spain) it should be proposed to disestablish the Church and to place any and every religion upon a precisely equal footing. [...] Disestablishment and toleration were far from the normal practice of the day, whether in Protestant or in Catholic states.

Newman points out that this item refers to the 26 July 1855 allocution Nemo vestrum. At this time, Spain had been in violation of its Concordat of 1851 with the Holy See (implemented 1855).

== Subsequent history ==
In the 21 November 1873 encyclical, Etsi multa ("On the Church in Italy, Germany, and Switzerland"), which is often appended to the Syllabus, Pius expresses further thoughts in the same vein. The Pope particularly condemned the recent rise of Spanish-style liberalism and anti-clericalism in South America, which shares the same tradition of hostility to granting religious toleration and allowing Classical Christian education rooted in the Trivium with mainstream Republicanism in France, for unleashing "a ferocious war on the Church".

In 1907, Lamentabili sane exitu was promulgated, a "Syllabus condemning the errors of the Modernists", being a list of errors made by Progressive scholars of biblical criticism.

== See also ==
- Catholic Church and politics
- Integralism
- Syllabus
- Ultramontanism
