= Etsi multa =

Encyclical of Pope Pius IX

Etsi multa Latin for 'Although much suffering' Encyclical of Pope Pius IX
- Signature date: 21 November 1873
- Subject: On the Church in Italy, in Germany and in Switzerland
- Number: 34 of 41 of the pontificate
- Text: In English

Etsi multa (On The Church in Italy, Germany, and Switzerland) is a papal encyclical that was published by Pope Pius IX on November 21, 1873.

The encyclical stated that there were three campaigns being waged against the Church at the time:

- The Kulturkampf in the German Empire.
- The suppression by the post-unification Italian authorities of the Gregorian University. With the Capture of Rome in 1870, Rome and the Papal States were incorporated into the new Kingdom of Italy. The new government of Italy then confiscated the Gregorian property and building, converting it into the Ennio Quirino Visconti Liceo Ginnasio.
- An anticlerical movement in Switzerland, expressed through:
  - The expulsion of Gaspard Mermillod, the Vicar Apostolic of Geneva, Switzerland.
  - The enforcement of popular election of Catholic clerics in Geneva and to take an oath the Papacy found objectionable.
  - Anti-Catholic laws in the Swiss Cantons of Solothurn, Bern, Basel-Landschaft, Aargau and Zürich.
  - Suppression of Catholic priests in Jura.

It condemned Freemasonry, which was blamed for the widespread attack on the Catholic Church, accusing it of being "the Synagogue of Satan", an expression taken from Revelation.

== See also ==
- List of encyclicals of Pope Pius IX
- Pope Pius IX and Germany
