= Quartus supra =

1863 encyclical of Pope Pius IX

Quartus supra Encyclical of Pope Pius IX
- Signature date: January 6, 1873
- Subject: On the Church in Armenia
- Number: 33 of the pontificate, 41 of the total
- Text: In Latin; In English

Quartus supra ([Twenty-]four) is an encyclical of Pope Pius IX, dated 6 January 1873, addressed to the Armenian Catholic Church. The encyclical discusses the then-ongoing schism within the Patriarchate of Cilicia, the election of bishops, and supremacy of the Holy See.

== Context ==
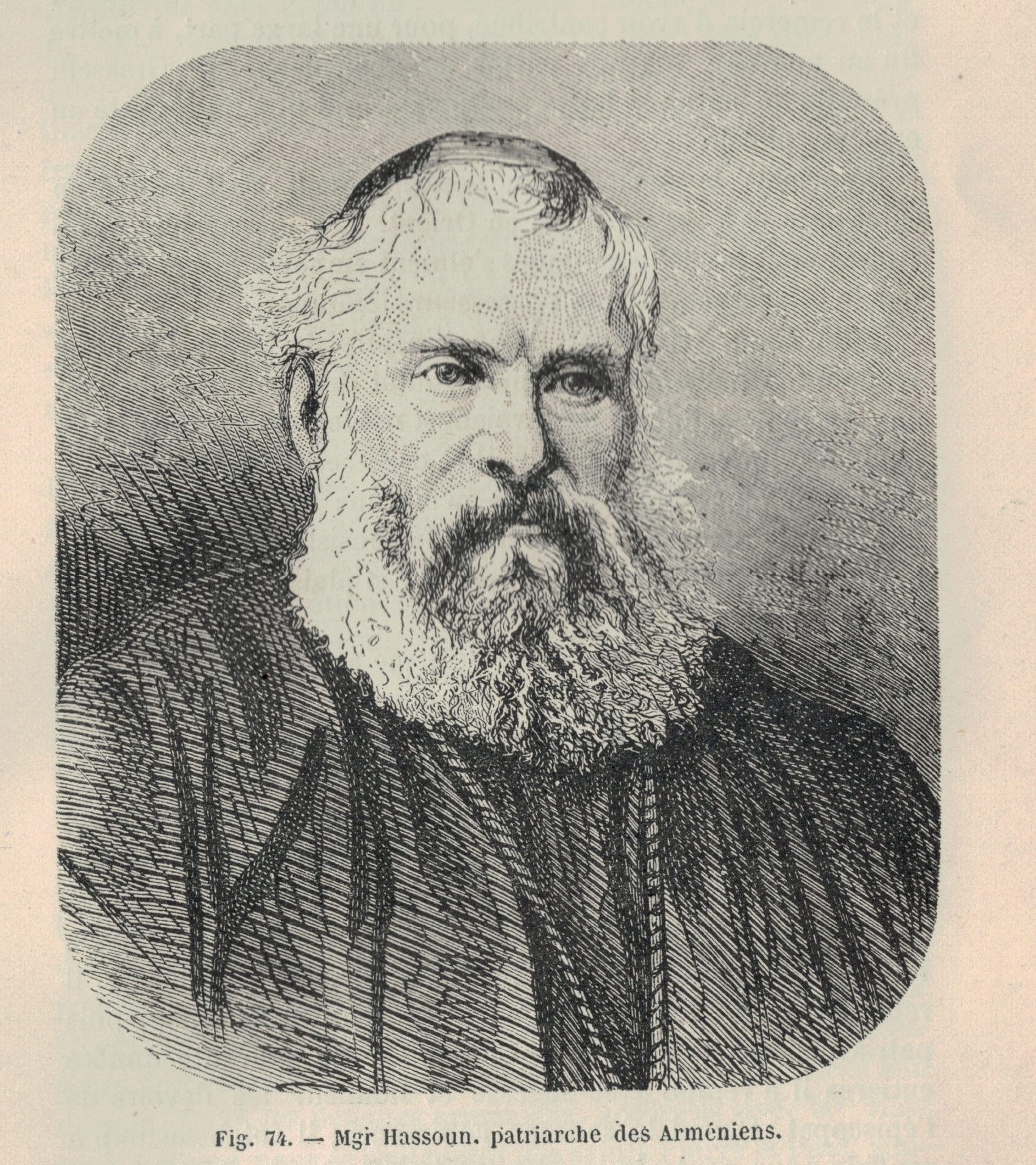
Andon Bedros IX Hassoun was Patriarch of Armenian Cilicia at the time the encyclical was published.

In 1867, the bull Reversurus imposed the Latin standards for electing bishops onto the Armenian Catholic Church, specifically by barring the laity from the elections. This led to dissension among the Armenian Catholic laity. Additionally, the bull merged the Eparchy of Constantinople with the Patriarchate of Cilicia.

In 1870, the First Vatican Council ruled that the Pope is preserved from error when speaking ex cathedra. This prompted a schism within the Armenian Catholic Church in 1871 and the election of the rival Catholic Armenian patriarch Jacob Pahtiarian whom the Holy See considers, along with his followers, as schismatic. Followers of Jacob Pahtiarian seized local churches and forced the Patriarch Andon Bedros IX Hassoun into exile. Consequently Jacob Pahtiarian and his followers were excommunicated in 1872.

== Content ==
Pope Pius IX addresses the encyclical to the "Patriarch of Cilicia, and the Archbishops, Bishops, Clergy and Laity, Our Beloved Children of the Armenian Rite Who are in Loving Communion with the Apostolic See". The encyclical can be summarized into the following sections:

- A summary of the events leading to the schism in Constantinople.
- An appeal to the Ottoman Sultan Abdulaziz to end the schism.
- A warning that the schismatics may prevail due to their deceptive use of the word "Catholic".
- An assertion of papal primacy.
- A defense of papal supremacy and the authority of the Pope to declare schismatics separate from the Catholic Church.
- An explanation of the creation of the Eparchy of Constantinople and its subsequent merger with the Patriarchate of Cilicia.
- An explanation of the means of electing a bishop, the reason for excluding the laity, and a defense of the Holy See's right to appoint bishops in time of necessity.
- The distinction between civil law and ecclesial law, and the Holy See's respect for the Ottoman government's civil authority.

== See also ==
- List of encyclicals of Pope Pius IX
- In Suprema Petri Apostoli Sede
