= Allocution (media theory) =

In media theory, allocution is the one-way dissemination of information through a media channel. It assumes that one party has an unlimited amount of information (usually through some kind of expertise) and can act as the ‘information services provider’ (pg 268) while the other party acts as the ‘information services consumer’ (Bordewijk and Kaam, 1986:268)

Allocution differs from distribution in that distribution implies that the original party loses some kind of control over the information. One party can tell many others a piece of information without losing it themselves; the original information store never becomes empty. (Bordewijk and Kaam, 1986:268)

The original party holds all control over the information. They decide when, how and how much information to give to the information services consumer. The consumer has no control over it in this model.

Examples of this type of communication include radio and traditional television programs such as the news.
