= Sacerdotal state =

State led by an ecclesiastical leader

A sacerdotal state is a state whose head is also an ecclesiastical leader designated by a religious body. An example of this kind of state is the Vatican City: its heads of state, the popes of the Catholic Church, have governed papal lands distinct from secular authority since the establishment of the Papal States in the 8th century AD. Andorra operates under a semi-sacerdotal system, as one of its co-heads of state is the bishop of Urgell, while the other is the head of state of France. However unlike the Vatican, the co-princes of Andorra are ceremonial and not closely involved in the government.

In the past, bishops commonly assumed temporal as well as spiritual authority and ruled as prince-bishops. This occurred, for example, in the Holy Roman Empire, where three of the seven imperial electors were prince-archbishops (those of Trier, Mainz and Cologne). After the 1648 Peace of Westphalia certain prince-bishoprics became bi-confessional and alternated between governance by Catholic bishops and by Protestant administrators.

== List of sacerdotal states ==
The following have been described as sacerdotal or partly sacerdotal states.

=== Current ===
==== Andorra ====
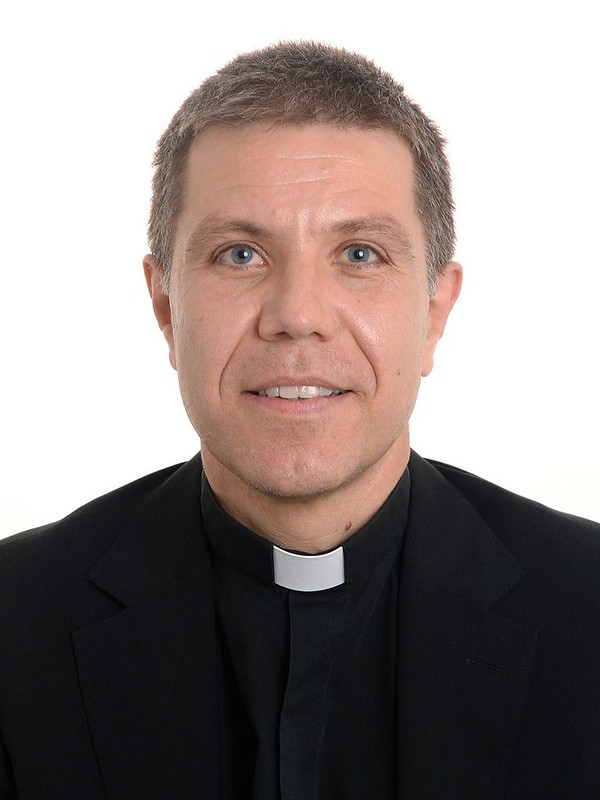
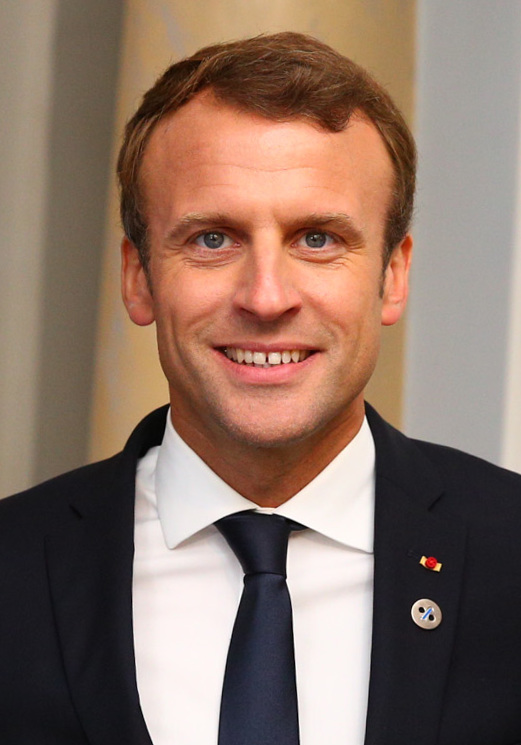
Andorra is a semi-sacerdotal state owing to the Bishop of Urgell, Josep-Lluís Serrano Pentinat (left), being one of its co-princes, the country's joint heads of state, alongside French President Emmanuel Macron (right)

Andorra operates under a semi-sacerdotal system, as one of its co-heads of state is the Roman Catholic bishop of Urgell, while the other is the president of France, however the co-princes of Andorra are not closely involved in the government. The Bishop of Urgell is one of two Catholic religious figures that also lead a country, the other being the pope, who leads Vatican City. Like other bishops, the Bishop of Urgell is also appointed by the pope in his capacity as bishop of Rome; thus, the pope appoints a fellow head of state.

==== Iran ====
The Supreme Leader of Iran, who is elected for life by a body consisting of senior Twelver Shī'a Muslim clerics, is the head of state and highest political authority in the country, as well the spiritual leader in his capacity as an ayatollah.

==== United Kingdom ====
Since the English Reformation, English and British monarchs have held the title supreme governor of the Church of England, signifying leadership of the state church. The subsequent personal and legal unions with Wales, Scotland and Ireland did not extend Anglicanism's status of state church to these lands. Thus in the United Kingdom, the monarch is the head of state and also the leader of the state church in England and its Crown dependencies.

==== Vatican City ====
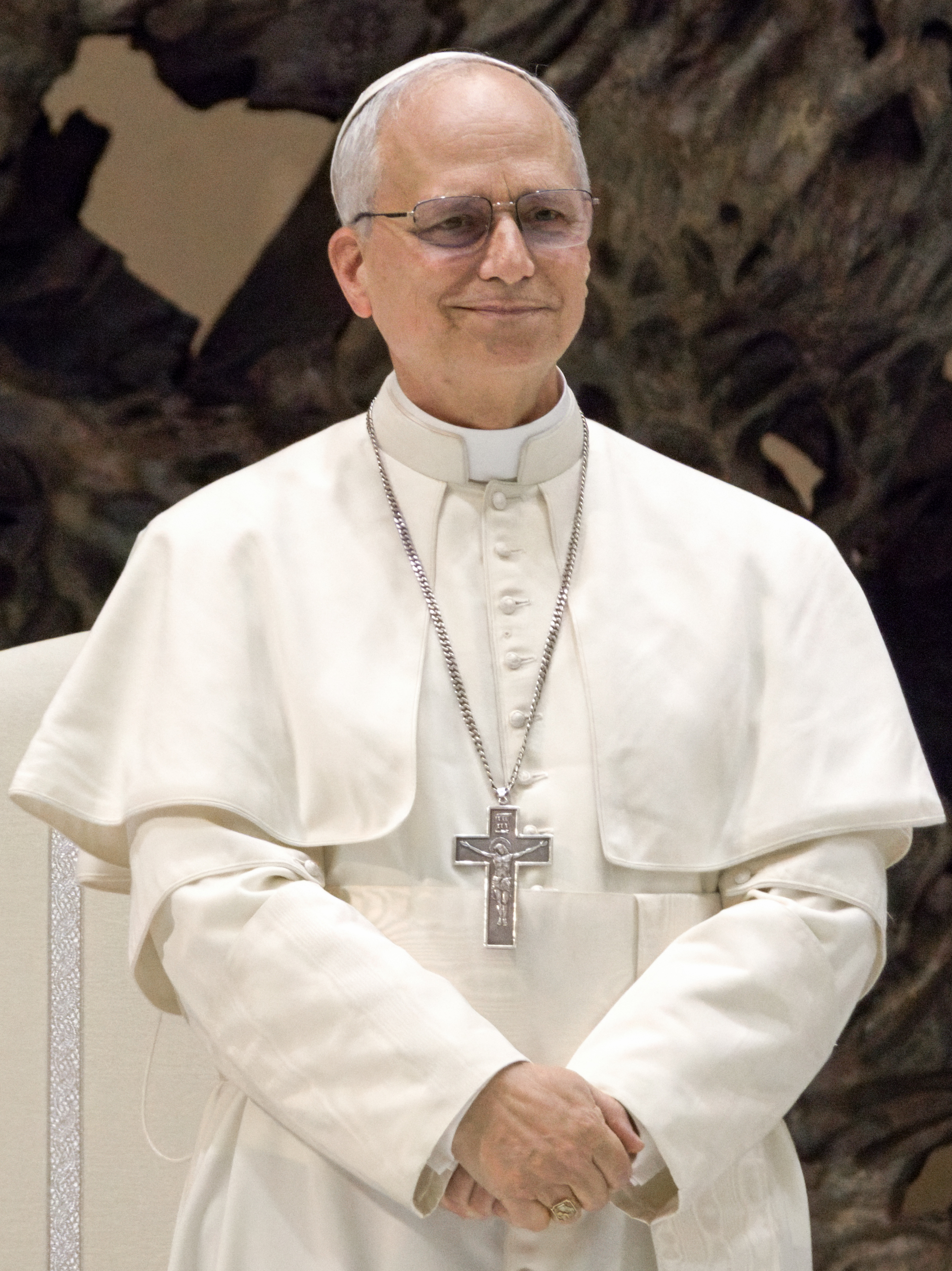
Vatican City's head of state and government is the pope, who is the head of the Catholic Church, with the current pope being Leo XIV (pictured).

Vatican City operates under an episcopal system; its head of state since its creation in the twentieth century is the pope of the Catholic Church. The pope is one of the two Catholic religious figures that also lead a country, the other being the Bishop of Urgell of Andorra.

=== Former ===
==== Montenegro ====
The Prince-Bishopric of Montenegro was a Serbian Orthodox ecclesiastical principality that existed from 1516 until 1852 in the Balkans during the Ottoman Empire's rule over most of the region.

==== Tibet ====
In the past, Tibet was ruled by the Dalai Lamas, political leaders who were symbolic religious leaders but had no formal position in religious organisations, so not being sacerdotal.

== See also ==
- Caliphate
- Caesaropapism
- Prince-bishop
- Summus episcopus
- Theocracy
