= Joseph Clifford Fenton =

American Catholic priest (1906–1969)

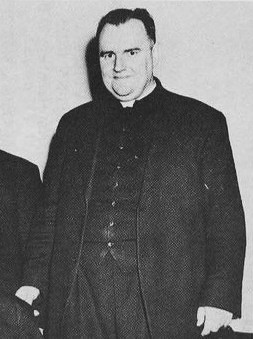
Fenton in 1946

Joseph Clifford Fenton (January 16, 1906 – July 7, 1969) was an American Catholic priest. He was a professor of fundamental dogmatic theology at the Catholic University of America and editor of the American Ecclesiastical Review (1943–1963). A strong conservative opponent of liberal beliefs, he was a significant American Catholic theologian of the 20th century. He served as a peritus for Cardinal Ottaviani at the Second Vatican Council, where his position was overruled. He was also secretary of the Catholic Theological Society of America.

== Early life ==
Fenton was born in Springfield, Massachusetts, on January 16, 1906. He was the eldest son of Michael Francis and Elizabeth (Clifford) Fenton.

== Formation ==
Fenton graduated with a B.A. degree from the College of the Holy Cross in Worcester, Massachusetts, in 1926.

He studied for the priesthood at the Grand Seminary in Montreal, Canada, until 1930 and received an S.T.L. and JCB from the University of Montreal.

On June 14, 1930, Bishop Thomas Michael O'Leary ordained Fenton at St. Michael's Cathedral in Springfield.

He obtained a doctorate in sacred theology (STD) from the Pontifical University of Saint Thomas Aquinas, Angelicum in Rome in 1931 under the direction of Fr. Reginald Garrigou-Lagrange, O.P.

== Career ==
Fenton was a curate at Immaculate Conception Church in Easthampton, Massachusetts, from 1931 to 1933 and at St. Joseph's Church, Leicester, Massachusetts, from 1933 to 1934. He taught philosophy at Saint Ambrose College in Davenport, Iowa, from 1934 to 1935).

At the formation of the Catholic Theological Society of America in 1946, the then-Father Fenton was one of its first officers in the position of secretary.

Fenton was a known figure with his cassock and biretta on the campus of The Catholic University of America for 25 years. His students remember him as an imposing person who lectured dramatically and often challenged them with unexpected questions. Fenton's colorful expressions and trenchant observations became legendary.

During his career, Fenton received many ecclesiastical honors from Rome. The Holy See named him a papal chamberlain (1951), a domestic prelate (1954) and a protonotary apostolic (1963). A recipient of the papal medal, Pro Ecclesia et Pontifice (1954), he belonged to the Pontifical Roman Theological Academy and was a counselor to the Sacred Congregation of Seminaries and Universities (1950–67).

Fenton died in Chicopee Falls, Massachusetts, on July 7, 1969.

== Works ==
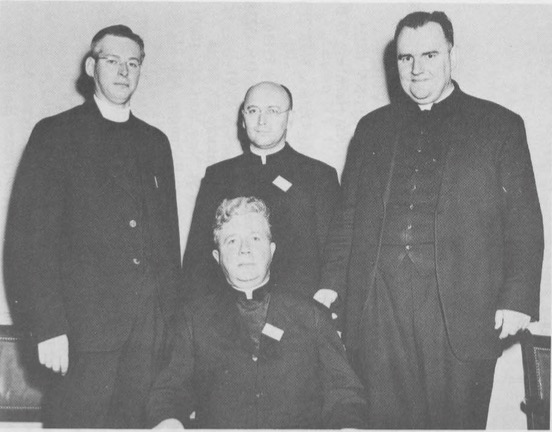
First officers of the Catholic Theological Society of America, left to right: Fr. James E. Rea, Fr. Gerard Yelle, Fr. Joseph Clifford Fenton, Fr. Francis J. Connell (seated)

Throughout his life, Fenton wrote an abundance of articles, especially on ecclesiology and church-state relations. He vigorously attacked the ideas of religious liberty promoted by Jesuit theologian John Courtney Murray. Thomas T. Love states, "Essentially by 'conservative' we mean...Catholic University of America in 1949; and Joseph Clifford Fenton."

Most of his hundreds of articles were published in the American Ecclesiastical Review, though he also contributed to Columbia, America, Fortnightly Review, Catholic Educational Review and Le Seminaire. His writing career also encompasses six books:

- The Theology of Prayer (1939)
- The Concept of Sacred Theology (1941)
- We Stand with Christ (1943)
- The Calling of a Diocesan Priest (1944)
- The Concept of the Diocesan Priesthood (1951)
- The Catholic Church and Salvation (1958). There is a Spanish translation.

The 21st century has seen something of a revival of interest in Fenton's books by traditionalist Catholics. In 2006, The Catholic Church and Salvation, a scholarly in-depth explanation of the Catholic dogma "No Salvation Outside the Church", was republished by the Society of St. Pius V's Seminary Press in Round Top, New York. In 2016, We Stand with Christ was republished by Emmaus Road Publishing under the title Laying the Foundation: A Handbook of Catholic Apologetics and Fundamental Theology. Also in 2016, Christian D. Washburn (Associate Professor of Dogmatic Theology, at the Saint Paul Seminary School of Divinity, in St. Paul, MN) edited a collection of Fenton's essays from American Ecclesiastical Review under the title The Church of Christ: A Collection of Essays by Monsignor Joseph C. Fenton, published by Cluny Media, which has overseen the bulk of the revival in Fenton's works, releasing new editions of The Theology of Prayer and The Concept of Diocesan Priesthood, under the title The Diocesan Priest in the Church of Christ, and including Fenton's dissertation, "The Concept of Sacred Theology", in its Thomist Tradition Series, under the title What Is Sacred Theology?.

During the first years of the Second Vatican Council, Fenton was a member of the preparatory Theological Commission, the Doctrinal Commission, the Commission on Faith and Morals and also a peritus. As a controversialist, he is best remembered for his aggressive opposition to John Courtney Murray, S.J., on religious freedom and on the relationship between church and State. However the Council endorsed Murray's position and rejected Fenton. Defeated and despondent, he resigned his academic roles and became a local parish priest. In December 1963, Fenton resigned as editor of the American Ecclesiastical Review "because of poor health" and became pastor of St. Patrick's Catholic Church in Chicopee Falls, Massachusetts. "He spent the remaining years of his life attacking from the pulpit the liberal reforms within the American church".

Fenton died of an acute heart attack, apparently in his sleep, on July 7, 1969. He is buried at St. Thomas Cemetery in Palmer, Massachusetts.

Joseph Clifford Fenton is sometimes confused with Fr. Francis E. Fenton (no relation), founder of the Orthodox Roman Catholic Movement.
