= Praedecessores nostros =

1847 papal encyclical by Pius IX

Praedecessores nostros Encyclical of Pope Pius IX
- Signature date: March 25, 1847
- Subject: On Aid for Ireland
- Number: 2 of the pontificate, 41 of the total
- Text: In original language

Praedecessores nostros, On Aid for Ireland, was a papal encyclical written by Pope Pius IX on March 25, 1847, to address the crisis of the Great Irish Famine that occurred approximately between 1845 and 1850. This event is known by many as the 19th century’s greatest natural disaster.

Pope Pius IX was born Giovanni Maria Mastai-Ferretti on May 13, 1792, in Senigallia, Italy. He studied at the College of Volterra in Tuscany and was ordained as a priest in 1819. In the course of his life, Pius IX served as the director of the Roman hospice of San Michele, Bishop of Imola, and Archbishop of Spoleto. He was made a Cardinal in 1840 and elected Pope in 1846. Several important events that occurred during the papacy of Pius IX are the unification of Italy, the First Vatican Council, the defining of the dogma of the Immaculate Conception, and 38 papal encyclicals.

Praedecessores nostros is one of the more significant papal decrees of the time because it addresses one of the most well-known events in history. The Great Irish Famine was caused by the mysterious fungus, Phytophthora infestans. The fact that the potato was the staple food of over half the population of Ireland caused approximately one million people to die as a consequence.

== Summary ==
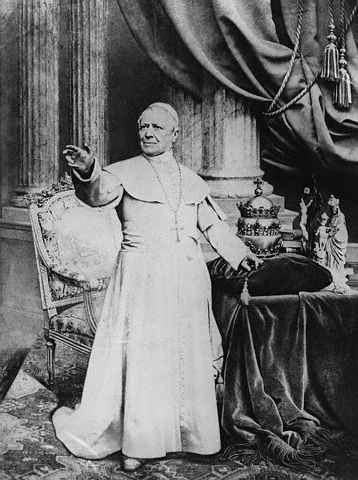
Pope Pius IX standing in front of his papal tiara

Praedecessores nostros discussed several major points that involve the various factors that address the Great Irish Famine. The first point made by Pope Pius IX in the encyclical is the importance of recognizing the legacies of papal predecessors and their assistance rendered to Christian nations in the past. He then reflected on an earlier appeal to the Roman people and clergy for prayerful consideration of the plight of the Irish. He also reflected on the request he had already made for money to be collected in Rome to be sent to the archbishops of Ireland so that it may be distributed amongst the poor and needy. Pius continued by saying that the crisis was not yet over and that the Vatican was still receiving letters daily telling that the famine has worsened and more aid is necessary. This led to the main reason for the encyclical, a request from the clergy for greater assistance.

Pope Pius IX asked every diocese and district to proclaim three days of public prayer in churches and other holy sites. The specific purpose of this prayer was to request that God end the Great Irish Famine and prevent it from happening elsewhere in Europe. To encourage these prayers, an indulgence of seven years was to be granted to anyone present during the proceedings. Also, a plenary indulgence was to be bestowed on anyone who attended the entire three days of prayer and received the sacraments of penance and Holy Communion within a week of doing so.

Pope Pius IX encouraged the people of the church to give alms because it was more important to look after Christ’s goods than those of man. In addition to the recommended public prayers for Ireland, he requested that the clergy ask their congregations to beseech God for the whole church against the evils that plagued its existence. Pope Pius IX delivered his address of Praedecessores nostros in Rome at St. Mary Major Basilica on March 25, 1847.

== Implications ==
The implications of Praedecessores nostros are minimal relative to the massive amount of attention that was given to the Great Irish Famine during the time. It is notable that relief was given in the form of money, but this did little to solve the various problems in Ireland and the United Kingdom in general. The most important implications of this papal encyclical are the knowledge it provided the world, and the greater connection it created between the Irish and the Catholic Church.

== See also ==
- List of encyclicals of Pope Pius IX
