= Quanto conficiamur moerore =

1863 encyclical of Pope Pius IX

Quanto conficiamur moerore Encyclical of Pope Pius IX
- Signature date: August 10, 1863
- Subject: On Promotion of False Doctrines
- Number: 22 of the pontificate, 41 of the total
- Text: In English

Quanto conficiamur moerore (or simply Quanto conficiamur) is an encyclical of Pope Pius IX, published on August 10, 1863, addressed to the College of Cardinals and Italian Episcopate.

Pius begins by addressing the hostility toward the Church throughout the world, particularly in Italy with the Piedmontese government. He condemns the errors of modern times and the spread of false ideas among some Catholics. He emphasizes that charity must be extended to those outside the Church and reproves the errors of selfishness and materialism. The Pope delivers a strong condemnation of those ecclesiastics and the “certain condemnable societies” of clergy who, with the approval of the Piedmontese government and Parliament, openly showed contempt for the Holy See and spread false doctrine.

Notably, the encyclical addresses the subject of salvation outside of the church. Beginning by rebuking the belief that eternal salvation could be attained even while "living in error and alienated from the true faith and Catholic unity," Pius recognizes that there are "those who are struggling with invincible ignorance about our most holy religion. Sincerely observing the natural law and its precepts inscribed by God on all hearts and ready to obey God, they live honest lives and are able to attain eternal life by the efficacious virtue of divine light and grace." The Pope then strongly reaffirms the teaching of extra Ecclesiam nulla salus and affirms that those who oppose the teaching of the church or are "stubbornly separated" from it cannot obtain eternal salvation. The encyclical gives praise for those clergy, consecrated virgins, and people of Italy who have remained faithful and ends on a hopeful note.
