= Papal allocution =

In the Roman Catholic Church, a papal allocution (from the Latin allocutio, a commander's battle speech to his troops) is a solemn, private form of address or speech employed by the Pope on certain occasions. Historically, papal allocutions were delivered only in a secret consistory of cardinals; popes since Pope Pius IX have made increasing use of allocutions, and modern allocutions may be delivered in private to any group.

Papal allocutions generally discuss issues on which church teaching impinges on civil matters, or other conflicts between church and state. The Pope prepares the allocution in consultation with his secretary of state, the cardinals in the consistorial congregation, and subject matter experts; although the allocution is delivered privately, it is usually published afterwards, in order to establish the stance of the Holy See on the relevant topic.

Notable papal allocutions have included:

- the 1808 allocutions of Pius VII on the French Concordat of 1801 and Napoleon
- the 1837 allocution of Gregory XVI on mixed marriages in Prussia
- Haerentem diu, an 1842 allocution of Gregory XVI on the persecution of the Church in Russia
- the allocutions of Pius IX on the temporal power of the Pope
- the allocutions of Pius X on the separation of Church and State in France
