= Nostis et nobiscum =

Encyclical by Pope Pius IX

Nostis et nobiscum Latin for 'You know and see with us' Encyclical of Pope Pius IX
- Signature date: 8 December 1849
- Subject: On the situation in Italy
- Text: In English

Nostis et nobiscum is an encyclical given by Pope Pius IX on December 8, 1849, on the topic of the Church in the Papal States.

In this document, the Pope denounces socialism and communism for attempting to confuse the faithful with new doctrines. He speaks of plots and conspiracies created by revolutionaries and rationalists in order to overthrow the temporal power of the Catholic Church. He deplores the problem of indifferentism in matters of religion and urges Italians to obey their legitimate political authorities. He adds that Christianity protects true liberty and equality, and that such revolutions are therefore useless.

== See also ==
- List of encyclicals of Pope Pius IX
