= Quanta cura =

1864 papal encyclical issued by Pope Pius IX

Quanta cura Encyclical of Pope Pius IX
- Signature date: 8 December 1864
- Subject: Condemning Current Errors
- Number: 25 of the pontificate, 41 of the total
- Text: In Latin; In English

Quanta cura (Latin for "With how great care") was a papal encyclical issued by Pope Pius IX on 8 December 1864. In it, he decried what he considered significant errors afflicting the modern age. These he listed in an attachment called the Syllabus of Errors, which condemned secularism and religious indifferentism.

== Context ==
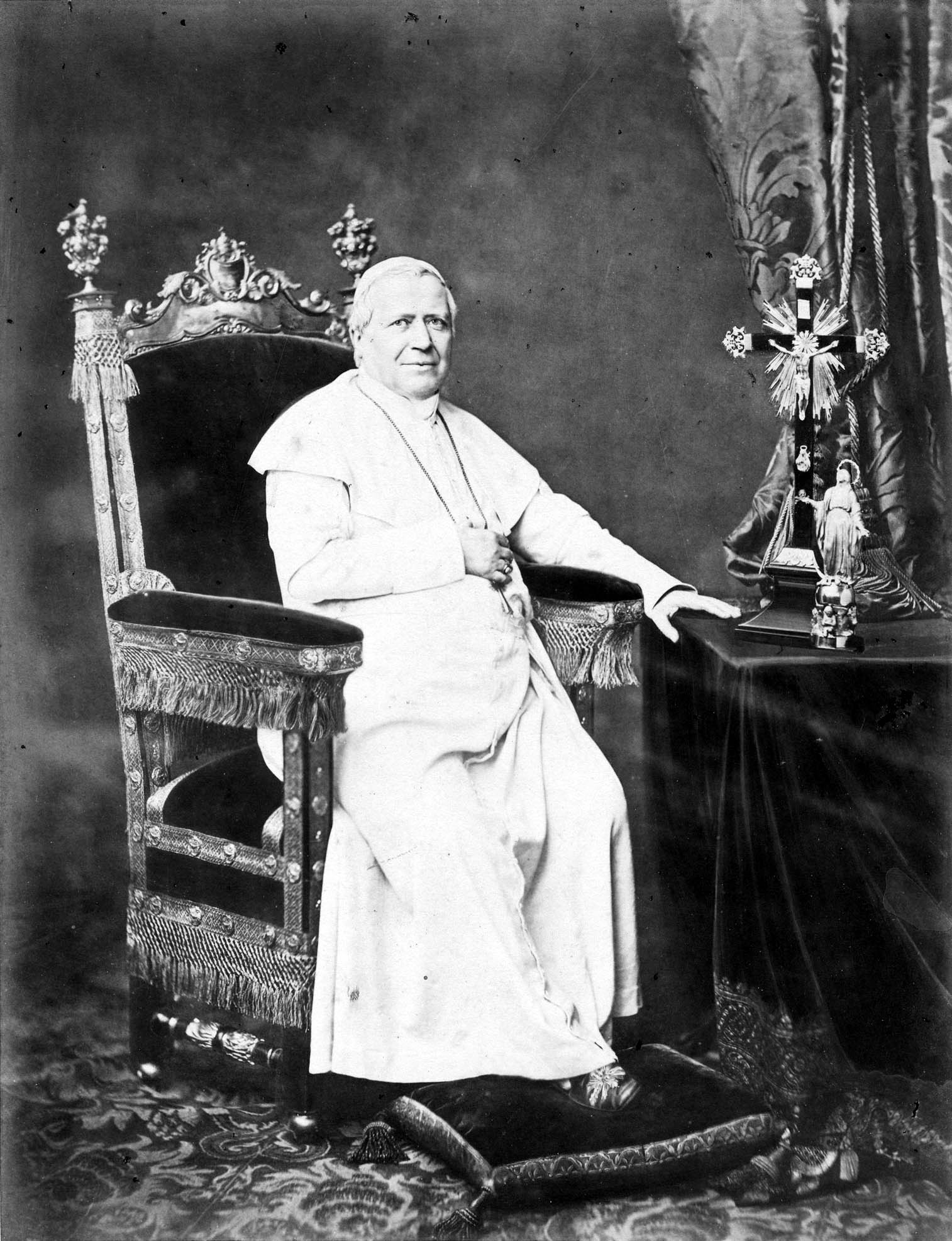
Pope Pius IX

In August 1863, Count Charles Montalembert, a proponent of Liberal Catholicism gave a series of speeches in Mechelen, Belgium, in which he presented his view of the future of modern society and the Church. His first speech aimed to show the necessity of Christianizing the democracy by accepting modern liberties. His second speech dealt with liberty of conscience, and the conclusion he drew was that the Church could be in perfect harmony with religious liberty and with the modern state founded on that liberty, and that everyone is free to hold that the modern state is to be preferred to those which preceded it, such as Ancien Régime France. He received support from Engelbert Sterckx, Archbishop of Mechelen, and Félix Dupanloup, Bishop of Orléans. But Louis-Édouard-François-Desiré Pie, Bishop of Poitiers, the papal nuncio to Belgium Bishop Mieczysław Halka-Ledóchowski, and the Jesuits who edited the "Civiltà Cattolica" were alarmed at these declarations. At the end of March 1864, he received a letter from Cardinal Giacomo Antonelli, Secretary of State, that criticized the Mechelen speeches.

Quanta cura was prompted by the September Convention of 1864 between the emerging Kingdom of Italy and the Second French Empire of Napoleon III. French troops had occupied Rome to prevent the Kingdom of Italy from capturing the city, defeating the Papal States, and completing the unification of the Italian Peninsula under its rule. Italians supporting the Risorgimento (unification) viewed the French troops as an occupying army, and in the 1864 Convention, France agreed to withdraw its military garrison from Rome to France in anticipation of war with Prussia.

Pius IX closed his encyclical with a plenary indulgence by declaring a Jubilee year for 1865.

== Opposition to unrestrained freedom of conscience ==
Pius reaffirms his predecessor's condemnation of liberty of conscience. In the 1832 encyclical Mirari Vos, Pope Gregory XVI deplored religious indifferentism which

"... gives rise to that absurd and erroneous proposition which claims that liberty of conscience must be maintained for everyone. It spreads ruin in sacred and civil affairs, …When all restraints are removed by which men are kept on the narrow path of truth, their nature, which is already inclined to evil, propels them to ruin.... Thence comes transformation of minds, corruption of youths, contempt of sacred things and holy laws — in other words, a pestilence more deadly to the state than any other. Experience shows, even from earliest times, that cities renowned for wealth, dominion, and glory perished as a result of this single evil, namely immoderate freedom of opinion, license of free speech, and desire for novelty.

Pius IX's 1864 encyclical specifically condemned the idea that:

..."liberty of conscience and worship is each man's personal right, which ought to be legally proclaimed and asserted in every rightly constituted society; and that a right resides in the citizens to an absolute liberty, which should be restrained by no authority whether ecclesiastical or civil, whereby they may be able openly and publicly to manifest and declare any of their ideas whatever, either by word of mouth, by the press, or in any other way."

== Propositions condemned ==
Quanta cura also condemns several other propositions, notably:

- That "the people’s will, manifested by what is called public opinion or in some other way, constitutes a supreme law, free from all divine and human control";
- That "in the political order accomplished facts, from the very circumstance that they are accomplished, have the force of right."
- That "that permission should be refused to citizens and to the Church, whereby they may openly give alms for the sake of Christian charity”;
- That laws should be abolished which require that “on certain fixed days servile works are prohibited because of God’s worship;”
- That "on civil law alone depend all rights of parents over their children, and especially that of providing for education.”
- That “the Church’s laws do not bind in conscience unless when they are promulgated by the civil power;”
- That Religious orders have no legitimate reason for being permitted to exist.”

These propositions were aimed at anticlerical governments in various European countries, which were in the process of secularizing education (sometimes by taking over Catholic schools rather than starting their own competing public schools), and suppressing religious orders while confiscating their property.

== Subsequent commentary ==
=== John Henry Newman ===
John Henry Newman comments on this passage in part 5 of his Letter to the Duke of Norfolk (1874), entitled "Conscience", which precedes part 6, "The Encyclical of 1864":

"And now I shall turn aside for a moment to show {251} how it is that the Popes of our century have been misunderstood by the English people, as if they really were speaking against conscience in the true sense of the word, when in fact they were speaking against it in the various false senses, philosophical or popular, which in this day are put upon the word. [...] Both Popes certainly scoff at the so-called 'liberty of conscience,' but there is no scoffing of any Pope, in formal documents addressed to the faithful at large, at that most serious doctrine, the right and the duty of following that Divine Authority, the voice of conscience, on which in truth the Church herself is built.

So indeed it is; did the Pope speak against Conscience in the true sense of the word, he would commit a suicidal act. He would be cutting the ground from under his feet. His very mission is to proclaim the moral law, and to protect and strengthen that 'Light which enlighteneth every man that cometh into the world.' On the law of conscience and its sacredness are founded both his authority in theory and his power in fact. Whether this or that particular Pope in this bad world always kept {253} this great truth in view in all he did, it is for history to tell. I am considering here the Papacy in its office and its duties, and in reference to those who acknowledge its claims. They are not bound by the Pope's personal character or private acts, but by his formal teaching. [...] The championship of the Moral Law and of conscience is his raison d'être. The fact of his mission is the answer to the complaints of those who feel the insufficiency of the natural light; and the insufficiency of that light is the justification of his mission. [...]

If, under the plea of his revealed prerogatives, he neglected his mission of preaching truth, justice, mercy, and peace, much more if he trampled on the consciences of his subjects,—if he had done so all along, as Protestants say, then he could not have lasted all these many centuries till now, so as to supply a mark for their reprobation. [...]

I wish to answer this important objection distinctly.

1. First, I am using the word "conscience" in the high sense in which I have already explained it,—not as a fancy or an opinion, but as a dutiful obedience to what claims to be a divine voice, speaking within us; and that this is the view properly to be taken of it, I shall not attempt to prove here, but shall assume it as a first principle. {256}

2. Secondly, I observe that conscience is not a judgment upon any speculative truth, any abstract doctrine, but bears immediately on conduct, on something to be done or not done. "Conscience," says St. Thomas, "is the practical judgment or dictate of reason, by which we judge what hic et nunc is to be done as being good, or to be avoided as evil." Hence conscience cannot come into direct collision with the Church's or the Pope's infallibility; which is engaged in general propositions, and in the condemnation of particular and given errors."

And on the condemnation of absolute freedom of speech, he wrote, after discussing the restrictions on freedom of speech and worship in English law (ibid, section 6):

"But now let us see, on the other hand, what the proposition really is, the condemnation of which leads [Gladstone] to say, that the Pope has unrestrictedly 'condemned those who maintain the liberty of the Press, the liberty of conscience and of worship, and the liberty of speech,' p. 16,—has "condemned free speech, free writing, and a free press," p. 42. The condemned proposition speaks as follows:—

'Liberty of conscience and worship, is the inherent right of all men. 2. It ought to be proclaimed in every rightly constituted society. 3. It is a right to all sorts of liberty (omnimodam libertatem) such, that it ought not to be restrained by any authority, ecclesiastical or civil, as far as public speaking, printing, or any other public manifestation of opinions is concerned.'

Now, is there any government on earth that could stand the strain of such a doctrine as this? It starts by taking for granted that there are certain Rights of man; Mr. Gladstone so considers, I believe; but other deep thinkers of the day are quite of another opinion; {274} however, if the doctrine of the proposition is true, then the right of conscience, of which it speaks, being inherent in man, is of universal force—that is, all over the world—also, says the proposition, it is a right which must be recognised by all rightly constituted governments. Lastly, what is the right of conscience thus inherent in our nature, thus necessary for all states? The proposition tells us. It is the liberty of every one to give public utterance, in every possible shape, by every possible channel, without any let or hindrance from God or man, to all his notions whatsoever [Note 2].

Which of the two in this matter is peremptory and sweeping in his utterance, the author of this thesis himself, or the Pope who has condemned what the other has uttered? Which of the two is it who would force upon the world a universal? All that the Pope has done is to deny a universal, and what a universal! a universal liberty to all men to say out whatever doctrines they may hold by preaching, or by the press, uncurbed by church or civil power. Does not this bear out what I said in the foregoing section of the sense in which Pope Gregory denied a "liberty of conscience"? It is a liberty of self-will. What if a man's conscience embraces the duty of regicide? or infanticide? or free love?"

=== William George McCloskey ===
Regarding the issues of civil control of education, and the separation of church and state, William George McCloskey first rector of the American College at Rome (and later Bishop of Louisville, Kentucky) observed wryly,

It is consoling to think that Our Holy Father has in all his official acts a light of guidance from on High, for according to all the rules of mere human prudence and wisdom [Quanta cura] … would be considered ill-timed. It can hardly be doubted that it places us in a place of apparent antagonism, at least as far as our principles are concerned, to the [American] institutions under which we live -and affords a great pretext to the fanatics who are eager to get up a crusade against us. God knows what is best for His church.

== Syllabus of Errors ==
Quanta cura is remembered mostly because alongside it appeared the Syllabus of Errors, which condemns a number of political, religious, and philosophical ideas including liberalism, modernism, moral relativism, secularization, and religious freedom.

== See also ==
- Catholicism and Freemasonry
- Declaration Concerning Status of Catholics Becoming Freemasons
- List of encyclicals of Pope Pius IX
- Papal documents relating to Freemasonry
- Papal infallibility
