= Ecclesiastical jurisdiction =

Authority of church leaders over others

Ecclesiastical jurisdiction is jurisdiction by church leaders over other church leaders and over the laity.

== Overview ==
Jurisdiction is a word borrowed from the legal system which has acquired a wide extension in theology, wherein, for example, it is frequently used in contradistinction to order, to express the right to administer sacraments as something added onto the power to celebrate them. So it is used to express the territorial or other limits of ecclesiastical, executive or legislative authority. Here it is used as the authority by which judicial officers investigate and decide cases under canon law.

Such authority, in the minds of lay Roman lawyers who first used the word "jurisdiction", was essentially temporal in its origin and in its sphere. Christians transferred the notion to the spiritual domain as part of the general idea of a Kingdom of God focusing on the spiritual side of man upon earth.

It was viewed as also ordained of God, who had dominion over his temporal estate. As the Church in the earliest ages had executive and legislative power in its own spiritual sphere, so also it had judicial officers, investigating and deciding cases. Before its union with the State, its power in this direction, as in others, was merely over the spirits of men. Coercive temporal authority over their bodies or estates could only be given by concession from the temporal ruler. Moreover, even spiritual authority over members of the Church, i.e. baptized persons, could not be exclusively claimed as a right by the Church tribunals, if the subject matter of the cause were purely temporal. On the other hand, it is clear that all the faithful were subject to these courts (when acting within their own sphere), and that, in the earliest times, no distinction was made in this respect between clergy and laity.

== Catholic Church ==
=== General concept and classification ===
The Catholic Church claims to be the Church founded by Jesus Christ for the salvation of men. The Catholic Church needs a regulating power (the authority of the Church). The decree Lamentabili sane, of 3 July 1907, rejects the doctrine that Christ did not desire to found a permanent, unchangeable Church endowed with authority. (Note: Lamentabili sane, n. 52 sqq.)

It is customary to speak of a threefold office of the Church: the office of teaching (prophetic office), the priestly office and the pastoral office (governing office). To those are attached the threefold authority of the Church: the teaching authority, ministerial authority and ruling authority. Since the teaching of the Church is authoritative, the teaching authority is traditionally included in the ruling authority; then only the ministerial authority and the ruling authority are distinguished.

By ministerial authority, which is conferred by an act of consecration, is meant the inward, and because of its indelible character permanent, capacity to perform acts by which Divine grace is transmitted. By ruling authority, which is conferred by the Church (missio canonica, canonical mission), is understood the authority to guide and rule the Church of God. Jurisdiction, insofar as it covers the relations of man to God, is called jurisdiction of the internal forum or jurisdiction of the forum of Heaven (jurisdictio poli) (see Ecclesiastical Forum); this again is either a) sacramental or penitential, so far as it is used in the Sacrament of Penance, or b) extra-sacramental, e.g. in granting dispensations from private vows. Jurisdiction, insofar as it regulates external ecclesiastical relations, is called jurisdiction of the external forum, or briefly jurisdictio fori. This jurisdiction, the actual power of ruling is legislative, judicial or coactive. Jurisdiction can be possessed in varying degrees. It can also be held either for both fora, or for the internal forum only, e.g. by the parish priest.

Jurisdiction can be further sub-divided into ordinary, quasi-ordinary and delegated jurisdiction.

==== Ordinary ====
Ordinary jurisdiction is that which is permanently bound, by Divine law or human law, with a permanent ecclesiastical office. Its possessor is called an ordinary judge. By Divine law the Pope has such ordinary jurisdiction for the entire Church and a bishop for his diocese. By human law this jurisdiction is possessed by the cardinals, officials of the Roman Curia and the congregations of cardinals, the patriarchs, primates, metropolitans, archbishops, the praelati nullius and prelates with quasi-episcopal jurisdiction, the chapters of orders or the superiors general of orders, cathedral chapters in reference to their own affairs, the archdiaconate in the Middle Ages, and parish priests in the internal forum.

==== Quasi-ordinary ====
If however jurisdiction is permanently connected with an office, but the office itself is said to be quasi-ordinary, or jurisdictio vicaria. This form of jurisdiction is possessed, for example, by a vicar-general. Temporary exercise of ordinary and quasi-ordinary jurisdiction can be granted, in varying degrees, to another as representative, without conferring on him an office properly so called. In this transient form jurisdiction is called delegated or extraordinary, and concerning it canon law, following the Roman law, has developed exhaustive provisions. This development began when the popes, especially since Alexander III (1159–81), found themselves obliged, by the enormous mass of legal business which came to them from all sides as the "judices ordinarii omnium" to hand over, with proper instruction, a large number of cases to third parties for decision, especially in matters of contentious jurisdiction.

==== Delegation ====
Delegated jurisdiction rests either on a special authorization of the holders of ordinary jurisdiction (delegatio ab homine), or on a general law (delegatio a lege, a jure, a canone). Thus, the Council of Trent transferred a number of papal rights to the bishops "tanquam Apostolicae Sedis delegati", i.e. also as delegates of the Apostolic See, and "etiam tanquam Apostolicae Sedis delegati", i.e. also as delegates of the Apostolic See. In the first class of cases, bishops do not possess ordinary jurisdiction. The meaning of the second expression is disputed, but it is generally taken as purely cumulative. If the delegation applies to one or several designated cases only, it is special delegation; if it applies to an entire class of subjects, it is then general delegation or delegation for the universality of causes. Delegated jurisdiction for the total of a number of matters is known as delegatio mandata. Only those can be appointed delegates who are competent to execute the delegation. For an act of consecration the delegate must have himself the necessary sacred orders. For acts of jurisdiction he must be an ecclesiastic, though the pope could also delegate a layman. Papal delegation is usually conferred only on ecclesiastical dignitaries or canons. The delegate must be twenty years old, but eighteen years suffices for one appointed by the pope. He must also be free from excommunication. Those placed under the jurisdiction of the delegator must submit to the delegation. Delegation for one matter can also be conferred upon several. The distinction to be made is whether they have to act jointly and severally (collegiately), jointly but individually (solidarily), or solidarily at least in some given case. The delegate is to follow exactly his instructions, but is empowered to do all that is necessary to execute them. If he exceed his power, his act is null.

When necessary the delegate can himself delegate, i.e. subdelegate, a qualified person; he can do this especially if he is a papal delegate, or if he has received permission, or if he has been delegated for a number of cases. Since delegation constitutes a new court, appeal can be taken from the delegate to the delegator, and in the case of subdelegation to the original delegator. Delegated jurisdiction expires on the death of the delegate, in case the commission were not issued in view of the permanence of his office, on the loss of office or the death of the delegator, in case the delegate has not acted (re adhuc integra, the matter being still intact), on recall of his authority by the delegator (even re adhuc nondum integra, the matter being no longer intact), on expiration of the allotted time, on settlement of the matter, on declaration of the delegate that he has no power.

=== Development of jurisdiction in the strict sense ===
The Catholic Church considers itself to have the right, as a perfect and independent society provided with all the means for attaining its end, to decide according to its laws disputes arising concerning its internal affairs, especially as to the ecclesiastical rights of its members; also to carry out its decision, if necessary, by suitable means of compulsion, contentious or civil jurisdiction. This implies the right to admonish or warn its members, ecclesiastical or lay, who have not conformed to its laws, and if needed to punish them by physical means, that is, coercive jurisdiction.

The church has the power to judge sin, in the internal forum, but a sin can be at the same time externally a misdemeanour or a crime (delictum, crimen), when threatened with external ecclesiastical or civil punishment. The Church also judges ecclesiastical crimes in the external forum by infliction of penalties, except when the wrongdoing has remained secret. In this case it contents itself, as a rule, with penance voluntarily assumed.

A last distinction is to be drawn between necessary jurisdiction and voluntary jurisdiction; the latter contemplates voluntary subjection on the part of those who seek in legal matters the co-operation of ecclesiastical agencies, e.g. notarially executed instruments, testaments, etc. The judicial power described above, jurisdiction strictly so called, was given by Christ to the Catholic Church, was exercised by the Apostles, and transmitted to their successors.

From the beginning of the Christian religion, the ecclesiastical judge, i.e. the bishop, decided matters of dispute that were purely religious in character (causae mere ecclesiasticae). This jurisdiction of the Church was recognized by the civil (imperial) power when it became Christian. But long before this the early Christians, following the exhortation of Paul of Tarsus (1 Corinthians 6:14), were wont to submit to ecclesiastical jurisdiction matters which by their nature belonged to the civil courts. As long as Christianity was not recognized by the State, it was left to the conscience of the individual whether he would conform to the decision of the bishop or not. Once Christianity had received civil recognition, Constantine the Great raised the former private usage to a public law. According to an imperial constitution of the year 321, the parties in dispute could, by mutual agreement, bring the matter before the bishop even when it was already pending before a civil judge, and the latter was obliged to put into effect the decision of the bishop. A further constitution of 331 provided that in any stage of the suit any one of the parties could appeal to the bishop even against the will of the others. But Arcadius in 398, and Honorius in 408, limited the judicial competence of the bishop to those cases in which both parties applied to him. This arbitral jurisdiction of the bishop was not recognized in the new Teutonic kingdoms. In the Frankish kingdoms, purely ecclesiastical matters of dispute belonged to the jurisdiction of the bishop, but mixed cases, in which civil interests appeared, e.g. marriage questions, lawsuits concerning Church property etc., belonged to the civil courts.

In the Middle Ages the Church succeeded in extending its jurisdiction over all matters that offered an ecclesiastical interest (causae spiritualibus annexae), all litigation concerning marriages; matters concerning burial; testaments; compacts ratified with an oath; matters pertaining to benefices; questions of patronage; litigation concerning church property and tithes. In addition, all civil litigation in which the element of sin was in question (ratio peccati) could be summoned before an ecclesiastical court.

Also the ecclesiastical court had jurisdiction over the affairs of ecclesiastics, monks and nuns, the poor, widows and orphans (personae miserabiles, the needy) and those persons to whom the civil judge refused legal redress. This far-reaching civil jurisdiction of the Church eventually overlapped the natural boundaries of Church and State. A reaction against this condition of affairs arose in England as early as the twelfth century, spread to France and Germany and gained in influence and justification the more the administration of justice by the State improved. At the end of the long vicissitudinous struggle, the Church lost its jurisdiction in res spiritualibus annexae, notwithstanding the claims of the Council of Trent, also the privilege of the clergy, and finally jurisdiction in matrimonial causes as far as their civil character was concerned.

In regard to ecclesiastical jurisdiction in criminal matters, the Church exercised jurisdiction at first only in purely ecclesiastical offences, and inflicted only ecclesiastical punishments, e.g. excommunication, and in the case of clerics deposition. The observance of these penalties had to be left to the conscience of the individual, but with the formal recognition of the Church by the State and the increase of ecclesiastical penalties proportioned to the increase of ecclesiastical offences, came an appeal from the Church to the secular arm for aid in enforcing the said penalties, which aid was always willingly granted. Some offence, especially deviations from the Catholic Faith, were by the State made punishable in civil law and secular penalties were attached to them, also to certain disciplinary misdemeanours of ecclesiastics. Conversely, the Church in the Middle Ages increased its penal jurisdiction in the civil domain by infliction of varied penalties, some of them purely secular in character.

Above all, by means of the privilegium fori it withdrew the so-called "criminous clerks" from the jurisdiction of the civil courts. Then it obtained for the court held by the bishop during his diocesan visitation (the send) not only the punishment of those civil misdemeanours which involved the element of sin and consequently affected both Church and State, but it also punished, and as such, purely civil offences. The penal jurisdiction of the medieval Church included, therefore, first the merely ecclesiastical offences, e.g. heresy, schism, apostasy etc.; then the merely civil offences; finally the mixed offences, e.g. sins of the flesh, sacrilege, blasphemy, any kind of magic, perjury, usury etc.

In punishing offences of a purely ecclesiastical character the Church disposed unreservedly of the aid of the State for the execution of the penalty. When in the aforesaid send court held by the bishop during his visitation, it inflicted punishment on the civil offences of the laity, the penalty, as a rule, was enforced by the imperial count (Graf) who accompanied the bishop and represented the civil power. The principle prevailed later that an offence already punished by a secular judge was no longer punishable by the ecclesiastical judge.

When the send began to disappear, both ecclesiastical and secular judges were in general held equally competent for mixed offences. Prevention (previous adjudication of the case by one judge or the other) was decisive. If the matter were brought before the ecclesiastical judge he inflicted at the same time the civil penalty, not, however, corporal punishments such as the death penalty. If the accusation was brought before the secular judge, the civil penalty was inflicted by him and the action of the Church was limited to the imposition of a penance. The Church eventually lost by far the greater part of its criminal jurisdiction for the same reasons which, since the end of the Middle Ages, led to the loss of most of its contentious jurisdiction, and in the same manner. Moreover, from the fifteenth century on, the recursus ab abusu which first arose in France (appel comme d'abus), that is the appeal from an abuse of power by an ecclesiastical authority, did much to weaken and discredit ecclesiastical jurisdiction.

=== Scope of jurisdiction in a strict sense ===
Today the only objects of contentious ecclesiastical jurisdiction (in which, however, the State often takes part or interferes) are: questions of faith, the administration of the sacraments, particularly the contracting and maintenance of marriage, the holding of church services, the creation and modification of benefices, the appointment to and the vacation of ecclesiastical offices, the rights of beneficed ecclesiastics as such, the ecclesiastical rights and duties of patrons, the ecclesiastical rights and duties of religious, the administration of church property.

As to the criminal jurisdiction of the Church it now inflicts on the laity only ecclesiastical penalties, and solely for ecclesiastical offences. If ever civil consequences ensue, only the civil authority can take cognizance of them. As regards ecclesiastics, the power of the Church to punish their disciplinary offences and maladministration of their offices, is widely acknowledged by the State. Where Church and State are not separated, the State aids in investigating these offences, as well as in executing the canonically rendered decisions of the Church.

As to the civil offences of ecclesiastics, ecclesiastical jurisdiction carries with it no secular consequences, though the Church is free to punish such offences by ecclesiastical penalties. According to the papal bull Apostolicae Sedis moderationi (12 October 1869), those persons fall under the excommunication reserved to the pope speciali modo, who directly or indirectly hinder the exercise of ecclesiastical jurisdiction in the external forum or in the internal forum, as well as those who appeal from ecclesiastical to civil jurisdiction; finally every legislator or person in authority who directly or indirectly compels a judge to cite ecclesiastical persons before a civil tribunal. In various concordats with the civil power, (Note: e.g. concordat with Bavaria, 1817, art. XII, lit. c. (concerning civil litigation); with Costa Rica, 1853, art XIV, XV; with Guatemala, 1853, art. XV, XVI; with Austria, 1855, art XIII, XIV; with Württemberg and Baden, 1857 and 1859, art. V.) the Catholic Church has more or less abandoned the privilegium fori of ecclesiastics.

== See also ==
- Congregationalist church governance
- Episcopalian church governance
- Presbyterian church governance
- Connexionalism
- Ecclesiology
- Canonical territory
