= Note on the importance of the internal forum and the inviolability of the Sacramental Seal =

2019 document in Roman Catholic canon law

Note on the importance of the internal forum and the inviolability of the Sacramental Seal is a July 1, 2019, document of the Apostolic Penitentiary, approved for promulgation on June 21, 2019, by Pope Francis, which explains that the internal forum of the sacrament of penance is sacred and that the inviolability of the Seal of the Confessional in the Catholic Church is absolute, in spite of civil law, as a matter of de fide dogma, and as part of freedom of religion and freedom of conscience. The aim of the Note is to fortify the assurance of trust on the part of people who go to confession.

== Internal forum ==
At the presentation of the Note, Pope Francis explained the meaning of the canon law term "internal forum":

And I would like to add – beyond the text – a word on the term "internal forum". This is not a trivial expression: it is stated seriously. The internal forum is an internal forum, and it cannot go "outside". And I say this because I have noticed that some groups in the Church, representatives, superiors – let us put it this way – blend the two things and take from the internal forum to make decisions in the external one, and vice versa. Please, this is a sin! It is a sin against the dignity of the person who trusts the priest, and who expresses his or own situation to ask for forgiveness, and then this is used to organize matters for a group or a movement, perhaps – I don't know, I am improvising – perhaps even a new congregation, I don't know. But the internal forum is an internal forum. And it is a sacred thing. I wanted to say this because I am concerned about this.

== Responses ==
Reuters, KATV, The Wall Street Journal, The Irish Times, and CBS News were among the media outlets to say that the Vatican was failing to fight clerical sex abuse by not weakening the sacramental seal. The Catholic News Agency welcomed the document, describing it as a reminder of the teachings of the Catholic Church.

== See also ==
- Priest–penitent privilege
