= Seal of confession in the Catholic Church =

Confidentiality of Catholic confession

In the Catholic Church, the Seal of Confession (also known as the Seal of the Confessional or the Sacramental Seal) is the absolute duty of priests or anyone who overhears a confession not to reveal anything that they learn from penitents during the course of the Sacrament of Penance (confession). Even where the seal of confession does not strictly apply – where there is no specific serious sin confessed for the purpose of receiving absolution – priests have a serious obligation not to cause scandal by the way they speak.

== History ==
=== Ecumenical councils ===
Canon 21 of the Fourth Council of the Lateran (1215), binding on the whole church, laid down the obligation of secrecy in the following words:

Let the priest absolutely beware that he does not by word or sign or by any manner whatever in any way betray the sinner: but if he should happen to need wiser counsel let him cautiously seek the same without any mention of person. For whoever shall dare to reveal a sin disclosed to him in the tribunal of penance we decree that he shall be not only deposed from the priestly office but that he shall also be sent into the confinement of a monastery to do perpetual penance.

— Hefele-Leclercq, Histoire des Conciles at the year 1215; Mansi or Harduin, "Coll. conciliorum"

Gratian, who compiled the edicts of previous Catholic Ecumenical Councils and the principles of church law, published the Decretum about 1151. It includes the following declaration of the law as to the seal of confession: "Let the priest who dares to make known the sins of his penitent be deposed." Gratian goes on to say that the violator of this law should be made a lifelong, ignominious wanderer. Notably, neither the Lateran canon nor the law of the Decretum purports to enact for the first time the secrecy of confession. The 15th-century English canonist William Lyndwood speaks of two reasons why a priest is bound to keep secret a confession, the first being on account of the sacrament because it is almost (quasi) of the essence of the sacrament to keep secret the confession.

=== Thomist theology ===
The Summa Theologiae devotes one article to the seal of confession, explaining that the seal may not be violated, including regarding matters that might indirectly lead to the seal's violation, not even violated by those who overhear the confession. Thomas gives two reasons for the seal's inviolability: the seal is divinely instituted and the seal prevents scandal.

=== Catechisms ===
According to the Roman Catechism, "the faithful are to be admonished that there is no reason whatever to apprehend that what is made known in confession will ever be revealed by the priest to anyone, or that by it the penitent can at any time be brought into danger of any sort [...] Let the priest, says the great Council of Lateran, take special care, neither by word or sign, nor by any other means whatever, to betray in the least degree the sinner."

Pope Pius X in his catechism taught that "the confessor is bound by the seal of confession under the gravest sin and under threat of the severest punishments both temporal and eternal."

The Catechism of the Catholic Church teaches in paragraph 1467:

Given the delicacy and greatness of this ministry and the respect due to persons, the Church declares that every priest who hears confessions is bound under very severe penalties to keep absolute secrecy regarding the sins that his penitents have confessed to him. He can make no use of knowledge that confession gives him about penitents' lives. This secret, which admits of no exceptions, is called the "sacramental seal", because what the penitent has made known to the priest remains "sealed" by the sacrament.

The Compendium of the Catechism of the Catholic Church elaborates that a confessor is bound to secrecy.

=== Apostolic Penitentiary ===
In Note on the importance of the internal forum and the inviolability of the Sacramental Seal, the Apostolic Penitentiary explained that the sacramental seal is universally and permanently inviolable as a matter of de fide dogma, and as part of freedom of religion and freedom of conscience, despite civil law.

== In practice ==
According to Roman Catholic canon law, "The sacramental seal is inviolable; therefore it is absolutely forbidden for a confessor to betray in any way a penitent in words or in any manner and for any reason." The confessor is always an ordained priest, because in the Catholic Church only ordained priests can absolve sins; lay confession is not recognized. Any person who overhears a confession is likewise bound by the seal.

Priests may not reveal what they have learned during confession to anyone under any circumstances, even under the threat of their own death or that of others. Punishment for breaking the seal of the confessional is conferred by the severity of the violation: "a confessor who directly violates the seal of the confessional", that is: explicitly connects a sin to a penitent, "incurs a latae sententiae excommunication". One who breaks the seal "indirectly" (that is, through their words and actions make known a particular penitent's sins and somehow connects those sins to the penitent) would be punished according to the "gravity of the offence". Both Pope John Paul II and Pope Benedict XVI made it a practice to attach an excommunication to indirect violations of the seal. Those who are privy to another person's confession either as an interpreter or by accidental circumstance are likewise punished according to the gravity of their delict "not excluding excommunication".

In the Early Modern period, some casuists (inter alia, Thomas Sanchez) justified mental reservation, a form of deception which does not involve outright lying, in specific circumstances including when such an action is necessary to protect secrecy under the seal of the confessional. Other casuists considered "grey areas" in which it was unclear whether or not the seal was being violated. A priest who says "I do not know" is thus to be understood as saying "I do not know with knowledge outside the Seal of the Confessional"; Thomas Aquinas goes even further and says that the priest knows the confession "not as man, but as God knows it".

It is permissible (though by no means necessary) for a priest to talk indirectly about some information he has or has not heard in confessions over the years as part of a homily or teaching lecture as long as he says or does nothing that would connect this information to any specific person. For example, he could choose to mention "I've heard the confession of a sex offender", or "I've almost never heard anyone explicitly confess a failure to help the poor." However, the Catholic Church punishes with excommunication latae sententiae anyone who records by any technical means or divulges what is said by the confessor or penitent.

== Recognition by civil authorities ==
The law of different jurisdictions in general requires people under certain circumstances to testify about facts known to them. In many cases, the rule of evidence of confessional privilege forbids judicial inquiry into communications made under the seal of confession.

There may be conflict between the obligation of confidentiality of confession and civil law. The Louisiana Supreme Court ruled in 2014 that a priest may be compelled to testify about what he was told in the confessional regarding a particular sexual abuse case, leaving the priest at risk of excommunication if he even confirms that a confession took place, or jail for contempt of court should he refuse to testify. However, the Court later ruled that a priest has no duty to report confidential information heard during a sacramental confession.

== Martyrs ==
John of Nepomuk, Mateo Correa Magallanes, Fernando Olmedo Reguera and Pedro Marieluz Garces are martyrs of the seal of the confessional in the Catholic Church, having chosen to die rather than violate the seal.

== See also ==
- Attorney–client privilege
- Confessional privilege in the United States
- I Confess, a 1953 Alfred Hitchcock film in which priest-penitent privilege is prominently featured
- Physician–patient privilege
- Priest-penitent privilege
- Priest-penitent privilege in England
- Priest-penitent privilege in France
- Seal of the Confessional and the Anglican Church
- Seal of the Confessional and the Lutheran Church
