= List of excommunicable offences from the Council of Trent =

The Council of Trent was held in several sessions from 1545 to 1563. The council was convoked to help the church respond to the challenge posed by the Protestant Reformation, which had begun with Martin Luther decades earlier. The council played a large part in the revitalization of the Roman Catholic Church throughout Europe.

A number of canons assigning automatic ex-communication were enacted, which became part of the church's canon law. Heresies about the Sacraments or de fide doctrines which had been rejected or re-defined by the Protestants were specified and assigned automatic excommunication for Catholics who held them. These canons still apply today, as evidenced by the fact that the contemporary Catechism of the Catholic Church cites them as authoritative on almost every page.

== Original Sin ==
Original sin is a Catholic doctrine that teaches that all human beings are born with the taint of Adam and Eve's sin; this taint can only be removed through baptism. Some Protestants re-defined (or rejected) original sin. The following canon laws were enacted to punish heretics in the church who rejected this belief.

1. If any one does not confess that the first man, Adam, when he had transgressed the commandment of God in Paradise, immediately lost the holiness and justice wherein he had been constituted; and that he incurred, through the offence of that prevarication, the wrath and indignation of God, and consequently death, with which God had previously threatened him, and, together with death, captivity under his power who thenceforth had the empire of death, that is to say, the devil, and that the entire Adam, through that offence of prevarication, was changed, in body and soul, for the worse; let him be anathema.
2. If any one asserts, that the prevarication of Adam injured himself alone, and not his posterity; and that the holiness and justice, received of God, which he lost, he lost for himself alone, and not for us also; or that he, being defiled by the sin of disobedience, has only transfused death, and pains of the body, into the whole human race, but not sin also, which is the death of the soul; let him be anathema.
3. If any one asserts, that this sin of Adam,--which in its origin is one, and being transfused into all by propagation, not by imitation, is in each one as his own, --is taken away either by the powers of human nature, or by any other remedy than the merit of the one mediator, our Lord Jesus Christ, who hath reconciled us to God in his own blood, made unto us justice, santification, and redemption; or if he denies that the said merit of Jesus Christ is applied, both to adults and to infants, by the sacrament of baptism rightly administered in the form of the church; let him be anathema.
4. If any one denies, that infants, newly born from their mothers' wombs, even though they be sprung from baptized parents, are to be baptized; or says that they are baptized indeed for the remission of sins, but that they derive nothing of original sin from Adam, which has need of being expiated by the laver of regeneration for the obtaining life everlasting,--whence it follows as a consequence, that in them the form of baptism, for the remission of sins, is understood to be not true, but false, --let him be anathema.
5. If any one denies, that, by the grace of our Lord Jesus Christ, which is conferred in baptism, the guilt of original sin is remitted; or even asserts that the whole of that which has the true and proper nature of sin is not taken away; but says that it is only rased, or not imputed; let him be anathema.

== Justification ==
Justification is what a person needs to do God's will and find salvation, a prominent controversy during the Reformation. Martin Luther, John Calvin and other prominent Protestants rejected the Catholic belief that a person needs to do good works to attain salvation, teaching that faith alone is sufficient. Connected to the controversy were other Protestant ideas in some sects: it was impossible for a person not to sin, that good deeds were still sinful in God's eyes, that one could be certain that one was saved in this life, or humanity was helpless in working for its salvation. At Trent, the Catholic Church enacted the following canons to excommunicate those with the following ideas.

1. If any one saith, that man may be justified before God by his own works, whether done through the teaching of human nature, or that of the law, without the grace of God through Jesus Christ; let him be anathema.
2. If any one saith, that the grace of God, through Jesus Christ, is given only for this, that man may be able more easily to live justly, and to merit eternal life, as if, by free will without grace, he were able to do both, though hardly indeed and with difficulty; let him be anathema.
3. If any one saith, that without the prevenient inspiration of the Holy Ghost, and without his help, man can believe, hope, love, or be penitent as he ought, so as that the grace of Justification may be bestowed upon him; let him be anathema.
4. If any one saith, that man's free will moved and excited by God, by assenting to God exciting and calling, nowise co-operates towards disposing and preparing itself for obtaining the grace of Justification; that it cannot refuse its consent, if it would, but that, as something inanimate, it does nothing whatever and is merely passive; let him be anathema.
5. If any one saith, that, since Adam's sin, the free will of man is lost and extinguished; or, that it is a thing with only a name, yea a name without a reality, a figment, in fine, introduced into the Church by Satan; let him be anathema.
6. If any one saith, that it is not in man's power to make his ways evil, but that the works that are evil God worketh as well as those that are good, not permissively only, but properly, and of Himself, in such wise that the treason of Judas is no less His own proper work than the vocation of Paul; let him be anathema.
7. If any one saith, that all works done before Justification, in whatsoever way they be done, are truly sins, or merit the hatred of God; or that the more earnestly one strives to dispose himself for grace, the more grievously he sins: let him be anathema.
8. If any one saith, that the fear of hell,-whereby, by grieving for our sins, we flee unto the mercy of God, or refrain from sinning,-is a sin, or makes sinners worse; let him be anathema.
9. If any one saith, that by faith alone the impious is justified; in such wise as to mean, that nothing else is required to co-operate in order to the obtaining the grace of Justification, and that it is not in any way necessary, that he be prepared and disposed by the movement of his own will; let him be anathema.
10. If any one saith, that men are just without the justice of Christ, whereby He merited for us to be justified; or that it is by that justice itself that they are formally just; let him be anathema.
11. If any one saith, that men are justified, either by the sole imputation of the justice of Christ, or by the sole remission of sins, to the exclusion of the grace and the charity which is poured forth in their hearts by the Holy Ghost, and is inherent in them; or even that the grace, whereby we are justified, is only the favour of God; let him be anathema.
12. If any one saith, that justifying faith is nothing else but confidence in the divine mercy which remits sins for Christ's sake; or, that this confidence alone is that whereby we are justified; let him be anathema.
13. If any one saith, that it is necessary for every one, for the obtaining the remission of sins, that he believe for certain, and without any wavering arising from his own infirmity and disposition, that his sins are forgiven him; let him be anathema.
14. If any one saith, that man is truly absolved from his sins and justified, because that he assuredly believed himself absolved and justified; or, that no one is truly justified but he who believes himself justified; and that, by this faith alone, absolution and justification are effected; let him be anathema.
15. If any one saith, that a man, who is born again and justified, is bound of faith to believe that he is assuredly in the number of the predestinate; let him be anathema.
16. If any one saith, that he will for certain, of an absolute and infallible certainty, have that great gift of perseverance unto the end,-unless he have learned this by special revelation; let him be anathema.
17. If any one saith, that the grace of Justification is only attained to by those who are predestined unto life; but that all others who are called, are called indeed, but receive not grace, as being, by the divine power, predestined unto evil; let him be anathema.
18. If any one saith, that the commandments of God are, even for one that is justified and constituted in grace, impossible to keep; let him be anathema.
19. If any one saith, that nothing besides faith is commanded in the Gospel; that other things are indifferent, neither commanded nor prohibited, but free; or, that the ten commandments nowise appertain to Christians; let him be anathema.
20. If any one saith, that the man who is justified and how perfect soever, is not bound to observe the commandments of God and of the Church, but only to believe; as if indeed the Gospel were a bare and absolute promise of eternal life, without the condition of observing the commandments; let him be anathema.
21. If any one saith, that Christ Jesus was given of God to men, as a redeemer in whom to trust, and not also as a legislator whom to obey; let him be anathema.
22. If any one saith, that the justified, either is able to persevere, without the special help of God, in the justice received; or that, with that help, he is not able; let him be anathema.
23. lf any one saith, that a man once justified can sin no more, nor lose grace, and that therefore he that falls and sins was never truly justified; or, on the other hand, that he is able, during his whole life, to avoid all sins, even those that are venial,-except by a special privilege from God, as the Church holds in regard of the Blessed Virgin; let him be anathema.
24. If any one saith, that the justice received is not preserved and also increased before God through good works; but that the said works are merely the fruits and signs of Justification obtained, but not a cause of the increase thereof; let him be anathema.
25. If any one saith, that, in every good work, the just sins venially at least, or-which is more intolerable still-mortally, and consequently deserves eternal punishments; and that for this cause only he is not damned, that God does not impute those works unto damnation; let him be anathema.
26. If any one saith, that the just ought not, for their good works done in God, to expect and hope for an eternal recompense from God, through His mercy and the merit of Jesus Christ, if so be that they persevere to the end in well doing and in keeping the divine commandments; let him be anathema.
27. If any one saith, that there is no mortal sin but that of infidelity; or, that grace once received is not lost by any other sin, however grievous and enormous, save by that of infidelity; let him be anathema.
28. If any one saith, that, grace being lost through sin, faith also is always lost with it; or, that the faith which remains, though it be not a lively faith, is not a true faith; or, that he, who has faith without charity, is not as Christ taught; let him be anathema.
29. If any one saith, that he, who has fallen after baptism, is not able by the grace of God to rise again; or, that he is able indeed to recover the justice which he has lost, but by faith alone without the sacrament of Penance, contrary to what the holy Roman and universal Church-instructed by Christ and his Apostles-has hitherto professed, observed, and taught; let him be anathema.
30. If any one saith, that, after the grace of Justification has been received, to every penitent sinner the guilt is remitted, and the debt of eternal punishment is blotted out in such wise, that there remains not any debt of temporal punishment to be discharged either in this world, or in the next in Purgatory, before the entrance to the kingdom of heaven can be opened (to him); let him be anathema.
31. If any one saith, that the justified sins when he performs good works with a view to an eternal recompense; let him be anathema.
32. If any one saith, that the good works of one that is justified are in such manner the gifts of God, as that they are not also the good merits of him that is justified; or, that the said justified, by the good works which he performs through the grace of God and the merit of Jesus Christ, whose living member he is, does not truly merit increase of grace, eternal life, and the attainment of that eternal life,-if so be, however, that he depart in grace,-and also an increase of glory; let him be anathema.
33. If any one saith, that, by the Catholic doctrine touching Justification, by this holy Synod inset forth in this present decree, the glory of God, or the merits of our Lord Jesus Christ are in any way derogated from, and not rather that the truth of our faith, and the glory in fine of God and of Jesus Christ are rendered (more) illustrious; let him be anathema.

== Sacraments ==
Most Protestants rejected or redefined the sacraments during the Reformation. The Catholic Church has seven sacraments: baptism, confirmation, the Eucharist, Penance, anointing of the sick, holy orders and matrimony. The church historically taught that the sacraments, existing in physical places and circumstances, gave invisible grace to the souls of those who received them with the proper disposition and were by no means symbolic. In the Catholic Church, only a priest or bishop could administer most sacraments. Many Protestants said that the Catholic Church had introduced elements into the church which had not come from Christ. To answer this challenge of its teachings, the council enacted the following canons to punish heretics in the church who rejected its teachings on the sacraments.

1. If any one saith, that the sacraments of the New Law were not all instituted by Jesus Christ, our Lord; or, that they are more, or less, than seven, to wit, Baptism, Confirmation, the Eucharist, Penance, Extreme Unction, Order, and Matrimony; or even that any one of these seven is not truly and properly a sacrament; let him be anathema.
2. If any one saith, that these said sacraments of the New Law do not differ from the sacraments of the Old Law, save that the ceremonies are different, and different the outward rites; let him be anathema.
3. If any one saith, that these seven sacraments are in such wise equal to each other, as that one is not in any way more worthy than another; let him be anathema.
4. If any one saith, that the sacraments of the New Law are not necessary unto salvation, but superfluous; and that, without them, or without the desire thereof, men obtain of God, through faith alone, the grace of justification;-though all (the sacraments) are not indeed necessary for every individual; let him be anathema.
5. If any one saith, that these sacraments were instituted for the sake of nourishing faith alone; let him be anathema.
6. If any one saith, that the sacraments of the New Law do not contain the grace which they signify; or, that they do not confer that grace on those who do not place an obstacle thereunto; as though they were merely outward signs of grace or justice received through faith, and certain marks of the Christian profession, whereby believers are distinguished amongst men from unbelievers; let him be anathema.
7. If any one saith, that grace, as far as God's part is concerned, is not given through the said sacraments, always, and to all men, even though they receive them rightly, but (only) sometimes, and to some persons; let him be anathema.
8. If any one saith, that by the said sacraments of the New Law grace is not conferred through the act performed, but that faith alone in the divine promise suffices for the obtaining of grace; let him be anathema.
9. If any one saith, that, in the three sacraments, Baptism, to wit, Confirmation, and Order, there is not imprinted in the soul a character, that is, a certain spiritual and indelible Sign, on account of which they cannot be repeated; let him be anathema.
10. If any one saith, that all Christians have power to administer the word, and all the sacraments; let him be anathema.
11. If any one saith, that, in ministers, when they effect, and confer the sacraments, there is not required the intention at least of doing what the Church does; let him be anathema.
12. If any one saith, that a minister, being in mortal sin,-if so be that he observe all the essentials which belong to the effecting, or conferring of, the sacrament,-neither effects, nor confers the sacrament; let him be anathema.
13. If any one saith, that the received and approved rites of the Catholic Church, wont to be used in the solemn administration of the sacraments, may be contemned, or without sin be omitted at pleasure by the ministers, or be changed, by every pastor of the churches, into other new ones; let him be anathema.

=== Baptism ===
Although Martin Luther retained the Catholic form of baptism, other Protestants rejected or redefined it. Anabaptists rejected infant baptism and performed second baptisms on adults because they did not believe that infant baptism was intended by Christ. In response, the church enacted the following canons to excommunicate those who held these ideas.

1. If any one saith, that the baptism of John had the same force as the baptism of Christ; let him be anathema.
2. If any one saith, that true and natural water is not of necessity for baptism, and, on that account, wrests, to some sort of metaphor, those words of our Lord Jesus Christ; Unless a man be born again of water and the Holy Ghost; let him be anathema.
3. If any one saith, that in the Roman church, which is the mother and mistress of all churches, there is not the true doctrine concerning the sacrament of baptism; let him be anathema.
4. If any one saith, that the baptism which is even given by heretics in the name of the Father, and of the Son, and of the Holy Ghost, with the intention of doing what the Church doth, is not true baptism; let him be anathema.
5. If any one saith, that baptism is free, that is, not necessary unto salvation; let him be anathema.
6. If any one saith, that one who has been baptized cannot, even if he would, lose grace, let him sin ever so much, unless he will not believe; let him be anathema.
7. If any one saith, that the baptized are, by baptism itself, made debtors but to faith alone, and not to the observance of the whole law of Christ; let him be anathema.
8. If any one saith, that the baptized are freed from all the precepts, whether written or transmitted, of holy Church, in such wise that they are not bound to observe them, unless they have chosen of their own accord to submit themselves thereunto; let him be anathema.
9. If any one saith, that the resemblance of the baptism which they have received is so to be recalled unto men, as that they are to understand, that all vows made after baptism are void, in virtue of the promise already made in that baptism; as if, by those vows, they both derogated from that faith which they have professed, and from that baptism itself; let him be anathema.
10. If any one saith, that by the sole remembrance and the faith of the baptism which has been received, all sins committed after baptism are either remitted, or made venial; let him be anathema.
11. If any one saith, that baptism, which was true and rightly conferred, is to be repeated, for him who has denied the faith of Christ amongst Infidels, when he is converted unto penitence; let him be anathema.
12. If any one saith, that no one is to be baptized save at that age at which Christ was baptized, or in the very article of death; let him be anathema.
13. If any one saith, that little children, for that they have not actual faith, are not, after having received baptism, to be reckoned amongst the faithful; and that, for this cause, they are to be rebaptized when they have attained to years of discretion; or, that it is better that the baptism of such be omitted, than that, while not believing by their own act, they should be baptized in the faith alone of the Church; let him be anathema.
14. If any one saith, that those who have been thus baptized when children, are, when they have grown up, to be asked whether they will ratify what their sponsors promised in their names when they were baptized; and that, in case they answer that they will not, they are to be left to their own will; and are not to be compelled meanwhile to a Christian life by any other penalty, save that they be excluded from the participation of the Eucharist, and of the other sacraments, until they repent; let him be anathema.

=== Confirmation ===
In confirmation, a bishop anoints a person with oil and seals them with the gift of the Holy Spirit. This sacrament was rejected or redefined by a number of Protestant denominations. The following canons were enacted to punish those in the church who subscribed to any of the listed ideas.

1. If any one saith, that the confirmation of those who have been baptized is an idle ceremony, and not rather a true and proper sacrament; or that of old it was nothing more than a kind of catechism, whereby they who were near adolescence gave an account of their faith in the face of the Church; let him be anathema.
2. If any one saith, that they who ascribe any virtue to the sacred chrism of confirmation, offer an outrage to the Holy Ghost; let him be anathema.
3. If any one saith, that the ordinary minister of holy confirmation is not the bishop alone, but any simple priest soever; let him be anathema.

=== Eucharist ===
The Eucharist, also known as Holy Communion or the Blessed Sacrament, is bread and wine which are consecrated during Mass and transubstantiated into the body and blood of Christ. This core Catholic belief was rejected or redefined by most Protestants. Some, such as Luther, affirmed the Real Presence of Christ in the sacrament, but rejected the doctrine of Transubstantiation as an explanation of that Presence. Others affirmed a "spiritual" presence, or rejected the presence of Christ in the bread and wine outright. The following canons were enacted at Trent to punish Catholics who subscribed to the following ideas.

1. If any one denieth, that, in the sacrament of the most holy Eucharist, are contained truly, really, and substantially, the body and blood together with the soul and divinity of our Lord Jesus Christ, and consequently the whole Christ; but saith that He is only therein as in a sign, or in figure, or virtue; let him be anathema.
2. If any one saith, that, in the sacred and holy sacrament of the Eucharist, the substance of the bread and wine remains conjointly with the body and blood of our Lord Jesus Christ, and denieth that wonderful and singular conversion of the whole substance of the bread into the Body, and of the whole substance of the wine into the Blood-the species Only of the bread and wine remaining-which conversion indeed the Catholic Church most aptly calls Transubstantiation; let him be anathema.
3. If any one denieth, that, in the venerable sacrament of the Eucharist, the whole Christ is contained under each species, and under every part of each species, when separated; let him be anathema.
4. If any one saith, that, after the consecration is completed, the body and blood of our Lord Jesus Christ are not in the admirable sacrament of the Eucharist, but (are there) only during the use, whilst it is being taken, and not either before or after; and that, in the hosts, or consecrated particles, which are reserved or which remain after communion, the true Body of the Lord remaineth not; let him be anathema.
5. If any one saith, either that the principal fruit of the most holy Eucharist is the remission of sins, or, that other effects do not result therefrom; let him be anathema.
6. If any one saith, that, in the holy sacrament of the Eucharist, Christ, the only-begotten Son of God, is not to be adored with the worship, even external of latria; and is, consequently, neither to be venerated with a special festive solemnity, nor to be solemnly borne about in processions, according to the laudable and universal rite and custom of holy church; or, is not to be proposed publicly to the people to be adored, and that the adorers thereof are idolators; let him be anathema.
7. If any one saith, that it is not lawful for the sacred Eucharist to be reserved in the sacrarium, but that, immediately after consecration, it must necessarily be distributed amongst those present; or, that it is not lawful that it be carried with honour to the sick; let him be anathema.
8. lf any one saith, that Christ, given in the Eucharist, is eaten spiritually only, and not also sacramentally and really; let him be anathema.
9. If any one denieth, that all and each of Christ's faithful of both sexes are bound, when they have attained to years of discretion, to communicate every year, at least at Easter, in accordance with the precept of holy Mother Church; let him be anathema.
10. If any one saith, that it is not lawful for the celebrating priest to communicate himself; let him be anathema.
11. lf any one saith, that faith alone is a sufficient preparation for receiving the sacrament of the most holy Eucharist; let him be anathema. And for fear lest so great a sacrament may be received unworthily, and so unto death and condemnation, this holy Synod ordains and declares, that sacramental confession, when a confessor may be had, is of necessity to be made beforehand, by those whose conscience is burthened with mortal sin, how contrite even soever they may think themselves. But if any one shall presume to teach, preach, or obstinately to assert, or even in public disputation to defend the contrary, he shall be thereupon excommunicated.

==== Communion with both species and distribution to infants ====
Before the Reformation and going back to the time of Jan Hus, the church had experienced a controversy about whether bread and wine should be given to every communicant or only the bread. At that time it did not allow for the laity to receive the consecrated wine at Mass, partly due to the fear that the laity might abuse it; priests and bishops drank the consecrated wine. A century earlier, Hus rejected the church's position; the issue predated Luther, but during the Reformation the issue was raised again. Some Protestants said that the Catholic Church was not following Christ's teaching when it distributed the bread without the wine.

The church also historically gave communion to children only when they reached the age of reason, and this practice is still followed today. The Eastern Orthodox church distributed communion to infants (as it still does), and some Protestants questioned the Catholic doctrine. To answer this challenge, the church enacted the following canons to excommunicate any Catholic who subscribed to these beliefs.

1. If any one saith, that, by the precept of God, or, by necessity of salvation, all and each of the faithful of Christ ought to receive both species of the most holy sacrament not consecrating; let him be anathema.
2. if any one saith, that the holy Catholic Church was not induced, by just causes and reasons, to communicate, under the species of bread only, laymen, and also clerics when not consecrating; let him be anathema.
3. If any one denieth, that Christ whole and entire -the fountain and author of all graces--is received under the one species of bread; because that-as some falsely assert--He is not received, according to the institution of Christ himself, under both species; let him be anathema.
4. If any one saith, that the communion of the Eucharist is necessary for little children, before they have arrived at years of discretion; let him be anathema.

=== Penance ===
In confession (also known as the sacrament of Penance or reconciliation), a person confesses their sins to a priest or bishop and receives God's forgiveness through absolution by the priest or bishop. This sacrament was criticised by many Protestants during the Reformation and abolished in many of the new Protestant denominations on the basis that a priest or bishop did not have power from God to forgive (or refuse to forgive) people's sins. To answer this challenge, the church enacted the following canons to punish Catholics who subscribed to these ideas.

1. If any one saith, that in the Catholic Church Penance is not truly and properly a sacrament, instituted by Christ our Lord for reconciling the faithful unto God, as often as they fall into sin after baptism; let him be anathema.
2. If any one, confounding the sacraments, saith that baptism is itself the sacrament of Penance, as though these two Sacraments were not distinct, and that therefore Penance is not rightly called a second plank after shipwreck; let him be anathema.
3. If any one saith, that those words of the Lord the Saviour, Receive ye the Holy Ghost, whose sins you shall forgive, they are forgiven them, and whose sins you shall retain, they are retained, are not to be understood of the power of forgiving and of retaining sins in the Sacrament of penance, as the Catholic Church has always from the beginning understood them; but wrests them, contrary to the institution of this sacrament, to the power of preaching the gospel; let him be anathema.
4. If any one denieth, that, for the entire and perfect remission of sins, there are required three acts in the penitent, which are as it were the matter of the sacrament of Penance, to wit, contrition, confession, and satisfaction, which are called the three parts of penance; or saith that there are two parts only of penance, to wit, the terrors with which the conscience is smitten upon being convinced of sin, and the faith, generated by the gospel, or by the absolution, whereby one believes that his sins are forgiven him through Christ; let him be anathema.
5. If any one saith, that the contrition which is acquired by means of the examination, collection, and detestation of sins,--whereby one thinks over his years in the bitterness of his soul, by pondering on the grievousness, the multitude, the filthiness of his sins, the loss of eternal blessedness, and the eternal damnation which he has incurred, having therewith the purpose of a better life,--is not a true and profitable sorrow, does not prepare for grace, but makes a man a hypocrite and a greater sinner; in fine, that this (contrition) is a forced and not free and voluntary sorrow; let him be anathema.
6. If any one denieth, either that sacramental confession was instituted, or is necessary to salvation, of divine right; or saith, that the manner of confessing secretly to a priest alone, which the Church hath ever observed from the beginning, and doth observe, is alien from the institution and command of Christ, and is a human invention; let him be anathema.
7. If any one saith, that, in the sacrament of Penance, it is not necessary, of divine right, for the remission of sins, to confess all and singular the mortal sins which after due and diligent previous meditation are remembered, even those (mortal sins) which are secret, and those which are opposed to the two last commandments of the Decalogue, as also the circumstances which change the species of a sin; but (saith) that such confession is only useful to instruct and console the penitent, and that it was of old only observed in order to impose a canonical satisfaction; or saith that they, who strive to confess all their sins, wish to leave nothing to the divine mercy to pardon; or, finally, that it is not lawful to confess venial sins; let him be anathema.
8. If any one saith, that the confession of all sins, such as it is observed in the Church, is impossible, and is a human tradition to be abolished by the godly; or that all and each of the faithful of Christ, of either sex, are not obliged thereunto once a year, conformably to the constitution of the great Council of Lateran, and that, for this cause, the faithful of Christ are to be persuaded not to con fess during Lent; let him be anathema.
9. If any one saith, that the sacramental absolution of the priest is not a judicial act, but a bare ministry of pronouncing and declaring sins to be forgiven to him who confesses; provided only he believe himself to be absolved, or (even though) the priest absolve not in earnest, but in joke; or saith, that the confession of the penitent is not required, in order that the priest may be able to absolve him; let him be anathema.
10. If any one saith, that priests, who are in mortal sin, have not the power of binding and of loosing; or, that not priests alone are the ministers of absolution, but that, to all and each of the faithful of Christ is it said: Whatsoever you shall bind upon earth shall be bound also in heaven; and whatsoever you shall loose upon earth, shall be loosed also in heaven; and, whose sins you shall forgive, they are forgiven them; and whose sins you shall retain, they are retained; by virtue of which words every one is able to absolve from sins, to wit, from public sins by reproof only, provided he who is reproved yield thereto, and from secret sins by a voluntary confession; let him be anathema.
11. If any one saith, that bishops have not the right of reserving cases to themselves, except as regards external polity, and that therefore the reservation of cases hinders not but that a priest may truly absolve from reserved cases; let him be anathema.
12. If any one saith, that God always remits the whole punishment together with the guilt, and that the satisfaction of penitents is no other than the faith whereby they apprehend that Christ has satisfied for them; let him be anathema.
13. If any one saith, that satisfaction for sins, as to their temporal punishment, is nowise made to God, through the merits of Jesus Christ, by the punishments inflicted by Him, and patiently borne, or by those enjoined by the priest, nor even by those voluntarily undertaken, as by fastings, prayers, almsdeeds, or by other works also of piety; and that, therefore, the best penance is merely a new life; let him be anathema.
14. If any one saith, that the satisfaction, by which penitents redeem their sins through Jesus Christ, are not a worship of God, but traditions of men, which obscure the doctrine of grace, and the true worship of God, and the benefit itself of the death of Christ; let him be anathema.
15. If any one saith, that the keys are given to the Church, only to loose, not also to bind; and that, therefore, priests act contrary to the purpose of the keys, and contrary to the institution of Christ, when they impose punishments on those who confess; and that it is a fiction, that, after the eternal punishment, has, by virtue of the keys, been removed, there remains for the most part a temporal punishment to be discharged; let him be anathema.

=== Anointing of the sick ===
In the anointing of the sick, which is part of extreme unction or the last rites, a priest or bishop anoints a person with oil to ask God for healing, and prepare them for death in the event of a serious illness or other health-related event. Although it was almost exclusively given to those soon to die, in modern times it is frequently given to those who are seriously ill (e.g., before major surgery) to prepare them with God's help. Like other sacraments, this was challenged, rejected or redefined by many Protestants. To answer this, the church enacted the following canons to correct Catholics who subscribed to these ideas.

1. If any one saith, that Extreme Unction is not truly and properly a sacrament, instituted by Christ our Lord, and promulgated by the blessed apostle James; but is only a rite received from the Fathers, or a human figment; let him be anathema.
2. If any one saith, that the sacred unction of the sick does not confer grace, nor remit sin, nor comfort(h) the sick; but that it has already ceased, as though it were of old only the grace of working Cures; let him be anathema.
3. If any one saith, that the rite and usage of Extreme Unction, which the holy Roman Church observes, is repugnant to the sentiment of the blessed apostle James, and that is therefore to be changed, and may, without sin, be contemned by Christians; let him be anathema.
4. If any one saith, that the Presbyters of the Church, whom blessed James exhorts to be brought to anoint the sick, are not the priests who have been ordained by a bishop, but the elders in each community, and that for this Cause a priest alone is not the proper minister of Extreme Unction; let him be anathema.

=== Holy orders ===
Holy orders in the Catholic Church is the sacrament which makes a baptized man a deacon, priest or bishop. The church historically believed that a person who receives this sacrament is permanently changed and given special grace by God to serve in his place as a leader of the church. It also historically believed that only a priest or bishop could perform six of the seven sacraments (baptism could be performed by anyone and holy orders required a bishop, and the other five could be administered by a priest or bishop), and this sacrament gave him the power to do so. This belief was rejected by many Protestant denominations, who said that there was no mediator between man and God other than Jesus Christ, the Bible was the sole authority for Christians, that everyone in the church was equally empowered by God to be priests and that clerical celibacy did not come from Christ. In answer, the Catholic Church enacted the following canons to punish with excommunication anyone in the church who subscribed to these ideas.

1. If any one saith, that there is not in the New Testament a visible and external priesthood; or that there is not any power of consecrating and offering the true body and blood of the Lord, and of forgiving and retaining sins; but only an office and bare ministry of preaching the Gospel, or, that those who do not preach are not priests at all; let him be anathema.
2. If any one saith, that, besides the priesthood, there are not in the Catholic Church other orders, both greater and minor, by which, as by certain steps, advance is made unto the priesthood; let him be anathema.
3. If any one saith, that order, or sacred ordination, is not truly and properly a sacrament instituted by Christ the Lord; or, that it is a kind of human figment devised by men unskilled in ecclesiastical matters; or, that it is only a kind of rite for choosing ministers of the word of God and of the sacraments; let him be anathema.
4. If any one saith, that, by sacred ordination, the Holy Ghost is not given; and that vainly therefore do the bishops say, Receive ye the Holy Ghost; or, that a character is not imprinted by that ordination; or, that he who has once been a priest, can again become a layman; let him be anathema.
5. If any one saith, that the sacred unction which the Church uses in holy ordination, is not only not required, but is to be despised and is pernicious, as likewise are the other ceremonies of Order; let him be anathema.
6. If any one saith, that, in the Catholic Church there is not a hierarchy by divine ordination instituted, consisting of bishops, priests, and ministers; let him be anathema.
7. If any one saith, that bishops are not superior to priests; or, that they have not the power of confirming and ordaining; or, that the power which they possess is common to them and to priests; or, that orders, conferred by them, without the consent, or vocation of the people, or of the secular power, are invalid; or, that those who have neither been rightly ordained, nor sent, by ecclesiastical and canonical power, but come from elsewhere, are lawful ministers of the word and of the sacraments; let him be anathema.
8. If any one saith, that the bishops, who are assumed by authority of the Roman Pontiff, are not legitimate and true bishops, but are a human figment; let him be anathema.

=== Marriage ===
Marriage in the Catholic Church is a sacrament believed to bestow grace on the couple who receives it. Although Protestants did not reject the idea of monogamous heterosexual marriage during the Reformation, some questioned the church's teachings about divorce (the unbreakable nature of a consummated marriage or the rejection of polygamy found in the Bible). Like the other sacraments, Protestants rejected the idea that priests or bishops had a special power to sacramentally marry. To answer this challenge, the church enacted the following canons to punish Catholics who subscribed to any of these ideas.

1. If any one saith, that matrimony is not truly and properly one of the seven sacraments of the evangelic law, (a sacrament) instituted by Christ the Lord; but that it has been invented by men in the Church; and that it does not confer grace; let him be anathema.
2. If any one saith, that it is lawful for Christians to have several wives at the same time, and that this is not prohibited by any divine law; let him be anathema.
3. If any one saith, that those degrees only of consanguinity and affinity, which are set down in Leviticus, can hinder matrimony from being contracted, and dissolve it when contracted; and that the Church cannot dispense in some of those degrees, or establish that others may hinder and dissolve it; let him be anathema.
4. If any one saith, that the Church could not establish impediments dissolving marriage; or that she has erred in establishing them; let him be anathema.
5. If any one saith, that on account of heresy, or irksome cohabitation, or the affected absence of one of the parties, the bond of matrimony may be dissolved; let him be anathema.
6. If any one saith, that matrimony contracted, but not consummated, is not dissolved by the solemn profession of religion by one of the married parties; let him be anathema.
7. If any one saith, that the Church has erred, in that she hath taught, and doth teach, in accordance with the evangelical and apostolical doctrine, that the bond of matrimony cannot be dissolved on account of the adultery of one of the married parties; and that both, or even the innocent one who gave not occasion to the adultery, cannot contract another marriage, during the life-time of the other; and, that he is guilty of adultery, who, having put away the adulteress, shall take another wife, as also she, who, having put away the adulterer, shall take another husband; let him be anathema.
8. If any one saith, that the Church errs, in that she declares that, for many causes, a separation may take place between husband and wife, in regard of bed, or in regard of cohabitation, for a determinate or for an indeterminate period; let him be anathema.
9. If any one saith, that clerics constituted in sacred orders, or Regulars, who have solemnly professed chastity, are able to contract marriage, and that being contracted it is valid, notwithstanding the ecclesiastical law, or vow; and that the contrary is no thing else than to condemn marriage; and, that all who do not feel that they have the gift of chastity, even though they have made a vow thereof, may contract marriage; let him be anathema: seeing that God refuses not that gift to those who ask for it rightly, neither does He suffer us to be tempted above that which we are able.
10. If any one saith, that the marriage state is to be placed above the state of virginity, or of celibacy, and that it is not better and more blessed to remain in virginity, or in celibacy, than to be united in matrimony; let him be anathema.
11. If any one saith, that the prohibition of the solemnization of marriages at certain times of the year, is a tyrannical superstition, derived from the superstition of the heathen; or, condemn the benedictions and other ceremonies which the Church makes use of therein; let him be anathema.
12. If any one saith, that matrimonial causes do not belong to ecclesiastical judges; let him be anathema.

== Mass ==
The Mass, in which bread and wine is consecrated to become the body and blood of Christ (as Catholics believe) and offered to God as a sacrifice, was attacked by many Protestants who said that only Christ's sacrifice on the cross was a true sacrifice and Catholics showed disrespect to (or lack of faith in) his sacrifice by believing that their mass was the equivalent. Protestants also rejected elements of the mass such as priestly vestments and the naming of saints. In response, the Catholic Church enacted the following canons to punish with excommunication those in the church who subscribed to these ideas.

1. If any one saith, that in the mass a true and proper sacrifice is not offered to God; or, that to be offered is nothing else but that Christ is given us to eat; let him be anathema.
2. If any one saith, that by those words, Do this for the commemoration of me (Luke xxii. 19), Christ did not institute the apostles priests; or, did not ordain that they, and other priests should offer His own body and blood; let him be anathema.
3. If any one saith, that the sacrifice of the mass is only a sacrifice of praise and of thanksgiving; or, that it is a bare commemoration of the sacrifice consummated on the cross, but not a propitiatory sacrifice; or, that it profits him only who receives; and that it ought not to be offered for the living and the dead for sins, pains, satisfactions, and other necessities; let him be anathema.
4. If any one saith, that, by the sacrifice of the mass, a blasphemy is cast upon the most holy sacrifice of Christ consummated on the cross; or, that it is thereby derogated from; let him be anathema.
5. If any one saith, that it is an imposture to celebrate masses in honour of the saints, and for obtaining their intercession with God, as the Church intends; let him be anathema.
6. If any one saith, that the canon of the mass contains errors, and is therefore to be abrogated; let him be anathema.
7. If any one saith, that the ceremonies, vestments, and outward signs, which the Catholic Church makes use of in the celebration of masses, are incentives to impiety, rather than offices of piety; let him be anathema.
8. If any one saith, that masses, wherein the priest alone communicates sacramentally, are unlawful, and are, therefore, to be abrogated; let him be anathema.
9. If any one saith, that the rite of the Roman Church, according to which a part of the canon and the words of consecration are pronounced in a low tone, is to be condemned; or, that the mass ought to be celebrated in the vulgar tongue only; or, that water ought not to be mixed with the wine that is to be offered in the chalice, for that it is contrary to the institution of Christ; let him be anathema.

== Other offences ==
The council also recorded a number of other excommunicable offences not part of the above categories.

1. The holy Synod ordains, that no marriage can subsist between the abducer and her who is abducted, so long as she shall remain in the power of the abducer. But if she that has been abducted, being separated from the abducer, and being in a safe and free place, shall consent to have him for her husband, the abducer may have her for his wife; but nevertheless the abducer himself and all who lent him advice, aid, and countenance, shall be ipso jure excommunicated, for ever infamous, and incapable of all dignities; and if they be clerics they shall forfeit their rank. The abducer shall furthermore be bound, whether he marry the person abducted, or marry her not, to settle on her a handsome dowry at the discretion of the judge.
2. It is a grievous sin for unmarried men to have concubines; but it is a most grievous sin, and one committed in special contempt of this great sacrament, for married men also to live in this state of damnation, and to have the audacity at times to maintain and keep them at their own homes even with their own wives. Wherefore, the holy Synod, that it may by suitable remedies provide against this exceeding evil, ordains that these concubinaries, whether unmarried or married, of whatsoever state, dignity, and condition they may be, if, after having been three times admonished on this subject by the Ordinary, even ex officio, they shall not have put away their concubines, and have separated themselves from all connexion with them, they shall be smitten with excommunication; from which they shall not be absolved until they have really obeyed the admonition given them. But if, regardless of this censure, they shall continue in concubinage during a year, they shall be proceeded against with severity by the Ordinary, according to the character of the crime. Women, whether married or single, who publicly live with adulterers or with concubinaries, if, after having been three times admonished, they shall not obey, shall be rigorously punished, according to the measure of their guilt, by the Ordinaries of the places, ex officio, even though not called upon to do so by any one; and they shall be cast forth from the city or diocese, if the Ordinaries shall think fit, calling in the aid of the Secular arm, if need be; the other penalties inflicted on adulterers and concubinaries remaining in their full force.
3. The holy Synod, renewing the constitution of Boniface VIII., which begins Periculoso, enjoins on all bishops, by the judgment of God to which It appeals, and under pain of eternal malediction, that, by their ordinary authority, in all monasteries subject to them, and in others, by the authority of the Apostolic See, they make it their especial care, that the enclosure of nuns be carefully restored, wheresoever it has been violated, and that it be preserved, wheresoever it has not been violated; repressing, by ecclesiastical censures and other penalties, without regarding any appeal whatsoever, the disobedient and gainsayers, and calling in for this end, if need be, the aid of the Secular arm. The holy Synod exhorts Christian princes to furnish this aid, and enjoins, under pain of excommunication, to be ipso facto incurred, that it be rendered by all civil magistrates. But for no nun, after her profession, shall it be lawful to go out of her convent, even for a brief period, under any pretext whatever, except for some lawful cause, which is to be approved of by the bishop; any indults and privileges whatsoever notwithstanding.
4. And it shall not be lawful for any one, of whatsoever birth, or condition, sex, or age, to enter within the enclosure of a nunnery, without the permission of the bishop, or of the Superior, obtained in writing, under the pain of excommunication to be ipso facto incurred. But the bishop, or the Superior ought to grant this permission in necessary cases only; nor shall any other person be able by any means to grant it, even by virtue of any faculty, or indult, already granted, or that may hereafter be granted. And forasmuch as those convents of nuns which are established outside the walls of a city or town, are exposed, often without any protection, to the robberies and other crimes of wicked men, the bishops and other Superiors shall, if they think it expedient, make it their care that the nuns be removed from those places to new or old convents within cities or populous towns, calling in even, if need be, the aid of the Secular arm. As to those who hinder them or disobey, they shall by ecclesiastical censures compel them to submit.
5. But the patrons of benefices, of whatsoever order and dignity they may be, be they (the patrons) even communities, universities, or any colleges whatsoever whether of clerics or laymen, shall not in any way, nor for any manner of cause or occasion, meddle with the receiving of the fruits, rents, or revenues of any benefices whatsoever, even though those benefices be truly, by foundation or endowment, under their right of patronage; but shall leave them to the free disposal of the rector, or of the beneficiary, any custom whatever to the contrary notwithstanding. Nor shall they presume to transfer to others, contrary to the decrees of the canons, the said right of patronage, by sale, or under any other title whatsoever: if they act otherwise, they shall be subjected to the penalties of excommunication and interdict, and shall be ipso jure deprived of the aforesaid right itself of patronage. Moreover, those accessions made by way of union of free benefices with churches that are subject to the right of patronage, even of laymen, whether those churches be parochial, or benefices of any other kind whatsoever, even such as are simple, or are dignities, or hospitals, in such wise that the free benefices aforesaid are made to be of the same nature as those unto which they are united, and are placed under the (same) right of patronage; such (accessions), if they have not as yet been carried into full effect, as also such as shall henceforth be made, at the instance of any person whatsoever, by whatsoever authority, be it even apostolic, shall, together with the said unions themselves, be regarded as having been obtained surreptitiously; notwithstanding any form of words therein employed, or any derogation which may be held as equivalent to being expressed; nor shall such unions be any more carried into execution, but the benefices themselves so united shall, when vacant, be freely conferred as previously.
6. The synod enjoins all, of whatever rank and condition, who must pay tithes to pay the tithes in full to the cathedral or whatever other churches (or persons) they are lawfully due. Those who withhold them will be excommunicated.
7. If a cleric who formerly kept a concubine renews the interrupted connection or takes another concubine, they shall be excommunicated.
8. Dueling shall be exterminated from the Christian world. Any emperor, king, duke, prince, marquess, count or temporal lord by any other name who grants a place in their territory for single combat between Christians will be excommunicated and deprived of jurisdiction and dominion over any city, castle or place in which they permitted the duel to take place which is held from the church; if the place is held as a fief, they will escheat it to their overlord. Those who fight and their seconds will be excommunicated, their property confiscated, will be in perpetual infamy and punished as homicides according to canon law; if they died in the duel, they will be denied Christian burial. Counselors in, and spectators of, a duel shall be excommunicated and subject to perpetual malediction.
9. If anyone does not receive as sacred and canonical the books as they have been read in the Catholic Church and contained in the Latin Vulgate edition, and knowingly condemn the aforesaid traditions, let him be anathema.
10. It shall not be lawful for anyone to print (or cause to be printed) any books on sacred matters without the name of the author, to sell or keep them, unless they have been approved by the ordinary under pain of anathema and fine imposed in a canon of the last Council of Lateran.
11. If any cleric (or layman) should convert to his own use the jurisdiction, property, rents, rights, fruits, emoluments or sources of revenue belonging to any church or benefice, whether secular or regular, mount of piety or any other pious places, which ought to be employed for the necessities of the ministers and the poor; or hinder them from being received by those to whom they belong; he shall lie under an anathema until he has restored to the church and the administrator or beneficiary thereof the jurisdictions, property, effects, rights, fruits and revenues he has seized, and until he obtains absolution from the Roman Pontiff.
12. Clandestine marriages, made with the free consent of the contracting parties, are valid and true marriages if the church has not rendered them invalid; and those persons are condemned as with anathema who deny that such marriages are true and valid.
13. Earthly affections and desires so blind the eyes of temporal lords and magistrates that, by threats and ill-usage, they compel men and women who live under their jurisdiction (especially the rich, or those with expectations of a great inheritance) to contract marriage against their inclination with those whom lords or magistrates may prescribe for them. The synod enjoins on all, under pain of ipso facto anathema, that they put no constraint (direct or indirect) on those subject to them (or any others) to hinder them from freely contracting marriage.
14. The bishops shall teach that with the histories of the mysteries of our Redemption, portrayed by paintings or other representations, the people are instructed and confirmed in the articles of faith; great profit is derived from sacred images because the people are advised of the benefits and gifts bestowed on them by Christ and the miracles God has performed by means of the saints are before the eyes of the faithful so they may give God thanks, order their lives and manners in imitation of the saints, adore and love God and cultivate piety. If anyone teaches or entertain sentiments contrary to these decrees, let him be anathema.
15. Before the profession of a novice (male or female), nothing shall be given to the monastery from their property by parents, relatives or guardians except for food and clothing for their probation lest the novice may be unable to leave because the monastery possesses all (or most) of his substance and he may not easily be able to recover it if he leaves. The synod enjoins, under the pain of anathema on the givers and receivers, that to those who leave before their profession everything that was theirs be restored to them. The bishop shall, if need be, enforce this by ecclesiastical censures.
16. The synod places under anathema all who would force a virgin, widow or any other woman (except in cases provided for by law) to enter a convent against her will, take the habit of a religious order or make her profession; all those who lend their counsel or aid; and those who, knowing that she does not enter the convent, take the habit or make her profession voluntarily, shall in any way, interfere in that act by their presence, consent or authority. It subjects to a like anathema those who in any way, without a just cause, hinder the holy wish of virgins or other women to take the veil or make their vows. All things which ought to be done before (or at) profession shall be observed not in all convents. From the above are excepted those women known as penitents or convertites, in whose regard their constitutions shall be observed.
17. All ecclesiastical judges should refrain from ecclesiastical censures (or interdict), but in civil causes belonging to the ecclesiastical court it is lawful for them (if they judge it expedient) to proceed against all persons and terminate suits with fines assigned to pious places, or distraint of goods, or arrest (by their own or other officers) or deprivation of benefices and other remedies at law. If the execution cannot be made in this way and there is contumacy towards the judge, he may smite them also with the sword of anathema. Since the power of conferring indulgences was granted by Christ to the church and she has used that power, the synod enjoins that the use of indulgences is to be retained in the church and condemns with anathema those who assert that they are useless or deny that the church has the power to grant them.
18. The fathers who took part in the council were obliged to sign the decrees under threat of excommunication if they did not.

== See also ==
- List of excommunicable offences in the Catholic Church
