= Internal and external forum =

Distinction in Catholic canon law

In the canon law of the Catholic Church, a distinction is made between the internal forum, where an act of governance is made without publicity, and the external forum, where the act is public and verifiable. In canon law, internal forum, the realm of conscience, is contrasted with the external or outward forum; thus, a marriage might be null and void in the internal forum, but binding outwardly, i.e., in the external forum, for want of judicial proof to the contrary.

== Etymology ==
The judicial jurisdiction of the Catholic Church is expressed by the word Forum, the Latin designation for a place containing a tribunal of justice.

== Theoretical basis ==
As the Church is a perfect society, she possesses within herself all the powers necessary to direct her members to the end for which she was instituted and she has a correlative right to be obeyed by those subject to her. This right is called jurisdiction, and it is the source of all the Church's action that is not derived from the power of Sacred orders. It is this jurisdiction which is the foundation of ecclesiastical law, both externally and internally binding, and from Apostolic times it has been put into practice by the Church's rulers. Just as the civil State has the legitimate jurisdiction over its subjects to guide them to the end for which it is instituted, because it is a perfect society, so likewise the Church, being constituted by Christ as a perfect society, possesses within itself all the powers necessary for lawfully and effectively attaining the end for which it was established.

== Internal forum vs external forum ==
As the power of the Church extends not only to its individual members but also to the whole corporate body, not only to questions concerning the conscience but also to the public actions of its subjects, ecclesiastical jurisdiction is distinguished into that of the internal and external forum. It may so chance that circumstances may bring about a conflict between the internal and external forum. Thus, for example, a marriage may be null and void in the forum of conscience, but binding in the external forum for want of judicial proofs to the contrary, and vice versa.

== Internal forum ==
The jurisdiction of the internal forum deals with questions concerning the welfare of individual Christians and with their relation to God. Hence it is called the forum of conscience (Forum conscientiae). It is also denominated the forum of Heaven (forum poli) because it guides the soul on the path to God. The internal forum is subdivided into the sacramental or penitential, which is exercised in the tribunal of penance or at least is connected with it, and the extra penitential forum. Causes concerning the private and secret needs of the faithful can often be expedited outside the sacramental confession. Thus, vows may be dispensed, secret censures may be absolved, occult impediments of matrimony may be dispensed outside of the tribunal of penance. The internal forum deals therefore directly with the spiritual welfare of the individual faithful. It has reference to the corporate body only secondarily, in as much as the good of the whole organization is promoted by that of the individual members. Owing to the nature of the civil state and the end for which it was instituted, it has no jurisdiction corresponding to the ecclesiastical forum of conscience.

=== Sacramental and non-sacramental internal forum ===
Within the internal forum a distinction is made between the sacramental internal forum and the non-sacramental (penitential) internal forum, according as matters are decided in the sacrament of Penance, and thus additionally protected by the Seal of the Confessional, or outside of the sacrament.

Thus the name of the parties in a marriage contracted in the external forum are noted in a public register, but a marriage celebrated secretly is to be noted instead in a special register kept in the secret archive of the diocesan curia.

Sometimes power of governance is given for the sacramental forum only: in each diocese a priest is to be appointed who has the faculty, which he cannot delegate to others, of "absolving in the sacramental forum outsiders within the diocese and members of the diocese even outside the territory of the diocese from undeclared latae sententiae censures not reserved to the Apostolic See".

In the Roman Curia, the Apostolic Penitentiary has jurisdiction for matters of the internal forum, both sacramental and non-sacramental, but in some instances its decisions hold also in the external forum, as when, unless it states otherwise, a dispensation that it grants in the non-sacramental internal forum from an occult impediment to marriage, is sufficient even if the occult impediment later becomes public.

== External forum ==
The Church's jurisdiction in the external forum has reference to matters touching the public and social good of the corporate body. It corresponds, consequently, very closely to the powers exercised by civil magistrates in affairs belonging to their competence. While the external forum may busy itself with the concerns of individuals, it does so only in as far as these affect the public good. Thus the absolution of sins belongs to the internal forum, but the concession of the faculty for performing such absolution is an act of the external forum. The jurisdiction of the external forum is subdivided into voluntary and necessary. Voluntary, or extrajudicial, is that which a superior can exercise towards those who invoke his power, or even against those who are unwilling, but without his using the formalities prescribed in law. Necessary or contentious jurisdiction is that which the judge employs in punishing crimes or deciding disputes according to prescribed forms. In general, the acts of jurisdiction of the external forum are the decision of disputes concerning faith, morals or discipline, the making and enforcing of laws, the punishment of transgressors of ecclesiastical statutes, and the like.

== Competency ==
The competence of the ecclesiastical forum arises either from the persons or the cause to be judged. As to persons, all clerics are subject to its judgments both in civil and criminal causes (see clerical immunities). As to causes: they may be purely civil, or ecclesiastical, or they may be mixed. Purely civil causes would not of themselves properly belong to the Church's forum, as she recognizes the full competence of the state in such matters. Accidentally, however, such causes might be brought before the ecclesiastical judge. This supposes, however, the practical recognition of the Church's forum by the civil power. Ecclesiastical causes themselves are called civil when they concern either spiritual things, as the sacraments, or matters connected with them, as church property, the right of patronage, etc. They are called criminal when they involve the dealing with delinquents guilty of simony, apostasy, schism and the like. They are called mixed causes when they are subjects proper for decision by either the ecclesiastical or civil forum, as usurious contracts, concubinage, violations of the Church's peace, etc. Causes are likewise called mixed when they have both a spiritual and temporal end. Thus matrimony, in its sacramental nature as to validity or nullity, belongs to the Church; in its temporal aspect, as to the property of married persons and similar things, it may be dealt with by the civil tribunals. To this class of mixed causes can also be reduced the suppression of heresy, where Church and State cooperate with each other for the maintenance of the integrity or the faith and the preservation of the civil peace. Finally, many causes, of their nature civil, are accounted mixed by canonists, either because the State relinquished them to the Church's tribunals or custom gradually caused them to be relegated to the ecclesiastical forum, such as the recognition of last wills and testaments, the care of the poor, etc.

== Punishments ==
The punishments which may be inflicted by the external ecclesiastical forum are not only spiritual as excommunication, but also temporal or corporal.

As regards the infliction of the death penalty, canonists generally held that ecclesiastical law forbids inferior church tribunals to decree this punishment directly, but that the pope or a general council has the power, at least indirectly, in as much as they can demand that a Catholic state inflict this punishment when the good of the Church requires it. Finally, they held that there is no valid argument to prove that the direct exercise of this power does not fall within the competence of the ecclesiastical forum, although it was the custom of the latter to hand over the criminal to the secular arm for the infliction of the death penalty. However, death penalty was officially repudiated as a legitimate penalty by the Catholic Church in 2018.

The encroachments of the civil power on the Church's jurisdiction have in our days, practically though unwarrantly, restricted the ecclesiastical forum to spiritual causes only.

== Oriental and Latin canon law ==
The distinction between the internal forum and the external forum is recognized in canon 980 §1 of the Code of Canons of the Eastern Churches, which states

The power of governance is exercised in the external forum or in the internal sacramental or non-sacramental forum.

and in canon 130 of the 1983 Code of Canon Law, which states

Of itself, the power of governance is exercised for the external forum; sometimes, however, it is exercised for the internal forum alone, so that the effects which its exercise is meant to have for the external forum are not recognized there, except insofar as the law establishes it in determined cases.

== "Internal forum solution" ==
The term "internal forum" is sometimes used in connection with the controversial so-called "internal forum solution" claimed to justify reception of Holy Communion by someone who is convinced that a former marriage was invalid, but who cannot prove this externally so as to obtain a declaration of nullity. This is not a canonical solution.

== See also ==
- Priest–penitent privilege
- Note on the importance of the internal forum and the inviolability of the Sacramental Seal
