= Fernando Olmedo Reguera =

Spanish friar and martyr (1873–1936)

Saint Fernando Olmedo Reguera OFMCap
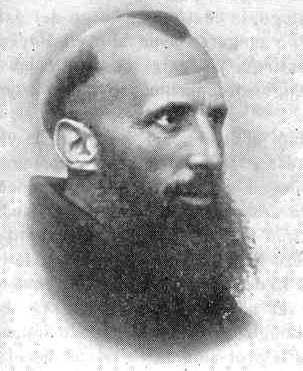

Martyr
- Born: 10 January 1873; Santiago de Compostela, Savoyard Spain
- Died: 12 August 1936 (aged 63); Near Madrid, Spain
- Cause of death: Execution by firing squad
- Venerated in: Catholic Church
- Beatified: 13 October 2013, Tarragona, Spain by Pope Francis

Fernando Olmedo Reguera OFMCap (10 January 1873 – 12 August 1936), also known as Fernando of Santiago, was a Spanish friar and victim of the Spanish Civil War. At the outbreak of war in 1936, Reguera was forced to leave his convent and was arrested, imprisoned, and beaten by Republican forces. Refusing to reveal penitents' confessions, he was then tried by a popular tribunal and sentenced to death. He was executed by firing squad. On 13 October 2013, Fernando was beatified by Pope Francis in Tarragona.

== Life ==
Fernando Olmedo Reguera was born in Santiago de Compostela, A Coruña. Following his calling to the faith, he joined the Order of Friars Minor Capuchin, being ordained a priest on 31 July 1904. At the outbreak of the Spanish Civil War, Reguera was serving as the order's provincial secretary, but like many others, he was forced to go into hiding. During this time, he attempted to continue his ministry, but he was apprehended just three weeks after the war began. In prison, he was subjected to numerous beatings, in spite of which he refused to break the seal of the confessional. He was then tried and executed at the Montaña barracks outside Madrid. His remains are entombed at the Church of Jesus of Medinaceli in Madrid.

== Beatification ==
On 27 March 2013, Fernando Olmedo Reguera was beatified as a martyr by Pope Francis in Tarragona.

== See also ==
- Seal of the Confessional in the Catholic Church
- Martyrs of the Spanish Civil War
