= Theologoumenon =

Statement lacking absolute doctrinal authority

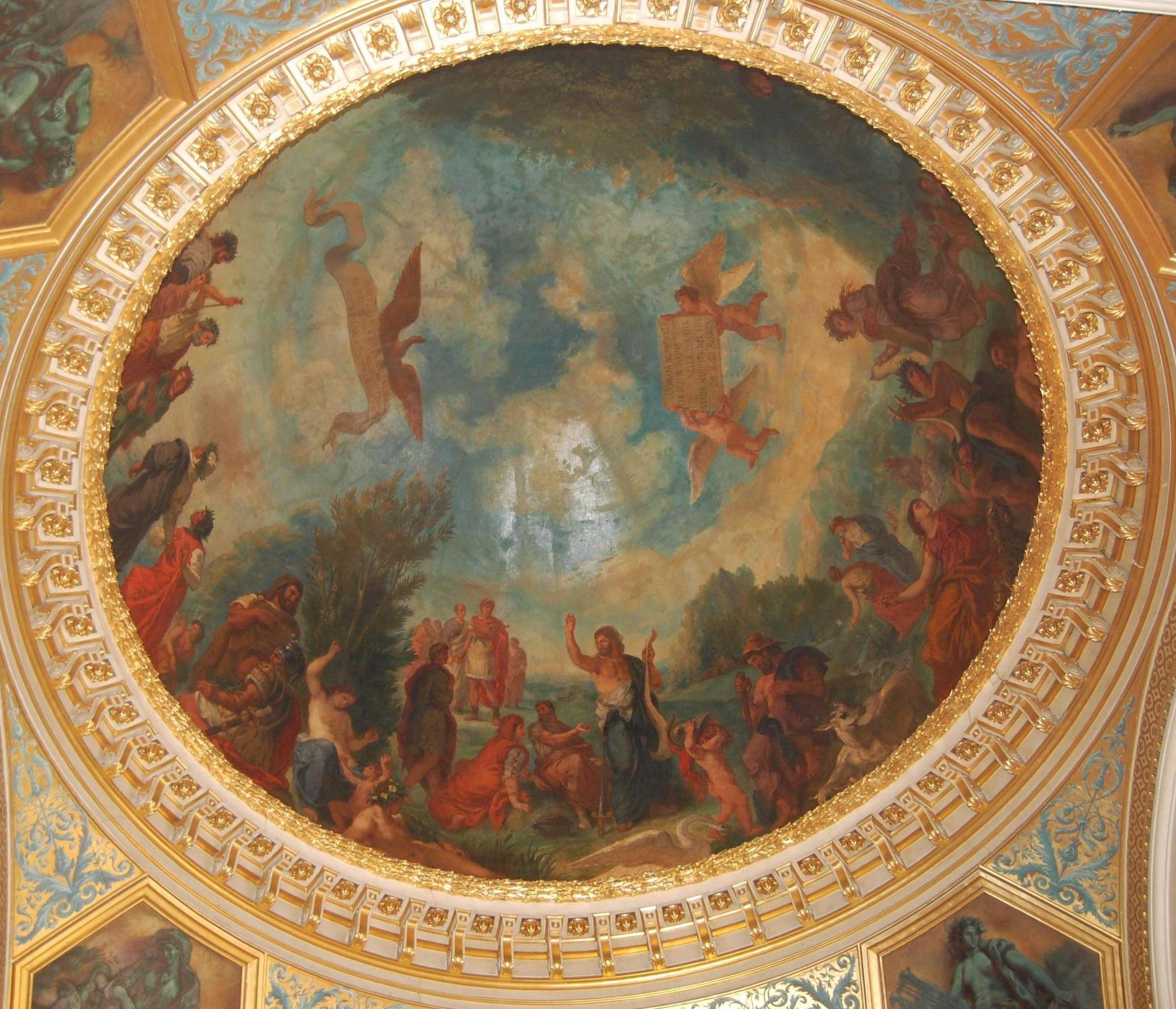
The mural "Les Limbes" by Delacroix in the Palais du Luxembourg. The Catholic idea of Limbo is often cited as a theologoumenon. Once a widespread concept, it is no longer usually taught in Catholic pedagogy, and has generally been abandoned since the Second Vatican Council. Pope Benedict XVI referred to it as a "theological hypothesis" and expressed doubts about its accuracy.

A theologoumenon (Koine Greek: θεολογούμενον, romanized: theologoúmenon, lit. 'that which is said about God') is a theological statement or concept that lacks absolute doctrinal authority. It is commonly defined as "a theological assertion or statement not derived from divine revelation", or "a theological statement or concept in the area of individual opinion rather than of authoritative doctrine".

== Understandings ==
=== Catholicism ===
In Roman Catholic theology, it usually refers to statements that are without direct confirmation in Scripture or official endorsement by the divinely inspired Teaching Magisterium of the Church, and are therefore not dogmatically binding per se, but are worth recommending because they cast light on understanding doctrines that are considered to be divinely revealed.

=== Eastern Orthodoxy ===
In Eastern Orthodox theology, the term has a roughly similar meaning. The Orthodox Church in America defines theologoumena as acceptably orthodox "theological opinions" that can develop into "pious traditions", but which nevertheless can be erroneous or imperfect. A more comprehensive Orthodox definition is often given as "the theological opinion of one or many of the holy fathers of the undivided Church." According to Bulgarian theologian Stefan Tsankov, "The content of the theologumena is probable truth." In Tsankov's words, "the number of the fathers who accept a given viewpoint of this nature has no significance as to its validity; still, the greater the number who defend such a statement, the greater probability of its truth." Other Orthodox thinkers often formulate the concept in a similar way. There is some disagreement between Eastern Orthodox and Catholic theologians as to which theological concepts are divinely revealed doctrines and which are simply theologoumena.

=== Elsewhere ===
A theologoumenon is a theological statement which cannot be directly regarded as the official teaching of the Church, as truth binding in faith. It is the outcome and communication of an endeavour to understand the faith by establishing connections between binding doctrines of faith by challenging dogmatic teachings with the whole of secular experience and all a man or an age knows.

Karl Rahner proposes that such an arrangement need not necessarily greatly differ from one that is actually of faith. He suggests that it can be enclosed in a truth of faith as a means to understanding that faith. Adding to this, Rahner goes on to say that these theologoumena are completely necessary for theology in the understanding of the faith. Revelation does not compose of all knowledge of reality in its origin and a person in his cognisance cannot understand, to assimilate something that bears no relation to his own knowledge. What is revealed can only be truly known and personally understood in a gathering of man's secular knowledge.

Thus when revelation is received by man in the present state of valid knowledge it combines with the experience and worldview of the hearer. Thus theolougumena are not necessarily the element of binding dogma contained in the meaning of a statement, they are the intellectual frame of reference that is expressed with it. This position is so that the dogma can be understood more clearly. Ultimately joining man's history with man's historic knowledge of truth.

Finally, a theologoumenon is a belief or clarification by a group of the Fathers and theologians of the Church upon a spiritual or theological matter that is not clearly communicated in the Scriptures or formulated in Church dogma as it is a work in progress.

== See also ==
- Adiaphora
- Filioque
- Heresy and Law of noncontradiction
- In necessariis unitas, in dubiis libertas, in omnibus caritas
- Theological censure and Theological notes
