= Heresy in the Catholic Church =

Heresy is defined by the Catholic Church as "the obstinate denial or obstinate doubt after the reception of baptism of some truth which is to be believed by divine and Catholic faith". The term heresy connotes both the belief in itself, and the attitude towards said belief.

== Definition and characteristics ==
=== Definition ===
Heresy has a specific meaning in the Catholic Church when it applies to someone's belief. There are four elements which constitute a person's formal heresy:

1. the person in question must have had a valid Christian baptism
2. the person claims to still be a Christian
3. the person publicly and obstinately denies or positively doubts a truth that the Catholic Church regards as revealed by God (through the Scriptures or Sacred tradition)
4. the disbelief must be morally culpable, that is, there must be a refusal to accept what is known to be a doctrinal imperative.

Therefore, to become a heretic and thus lose communion with the Catholic Church and hence no longer be Catholic, one must deny or question a truth that is taught by the Catholic Church as revealed by God, and at the same time know that the Catholic Church teaches it. However, if the person denied or questioned such a doctrine, but in good faith, that person is not considered a formal heretic by the Catholic Church, though it is an expression of material heresy.

Canon 751 of the Latin Church's 1983 Code of Canon Law, promulgated by Pope John Paul II in 1983, defines heresy as the following: "Heresy is the obstinate denial or doubt after the reception of baptism of some truth which is to be believed by divine and Catholic faith". Heresy is contrasted with apostasy – "the total repudiation of the Christian faith" – and with schism – " the refusal of submission to the Supreme Pontiff or of communion with the members of the Church subject to him". This definition and contrast are reused in the Catechism of the Catholic Church. The Catechism also contrasts heresy with incredulity, which is "the neglect of revealed truth or the willful refusal to assent to it".

=== Formal and material heresy ===
The Catholic Church distinguishes between formal and material heresy. The difference is the heretic's subjective disposition towards their opinion.

The heretic who is aware that their belief is at odds with Catholic teaching and yet freely and willingly continues to cling to their belief pertinaciously, "who denies a necessary truth out of vincible ignorance or from an error held out of bad or doubtful faith", is a formal heretic. This sort of heresy is sinful because in this case the heretic freely and knowingly holds an opinion that, in the words of the Catholic Encyclopedia, "is destructive of the virtue of Christian faith [...] disturbs the unity, and challenges the Divine authority, of the Church" and "strikes at the very source of faith".

Material heresy refers to an opinion objectively contradictory to the teachings of the Church, which as such is heretical, but which is uttered by a person who does not know the belief is heretical. A person who holds a material heresy may therefore not be a heretic in the strict sense. Material heresy is an opinion that is such that by holding it someone "denies a truth that must be held by divine and Catholic faith, but he is such because of invincible ignorance or because of an error held in good faith. Good faith in an erring man is a prudent judgment whereby the one in error thinks that he does not err, but on the contrary, that he is in possession of the truth". The opinion of a material heretic may produce the same objective results as formal heresy, but the heretic commits no sin by holding it.

=== Manifest, occult, public, and private heresy ===
The Catholic Church distinguishes between manifest, occult, public, and private heretics: (Note: The terminology used may vary depending on the author.)

A manifest heretic is someone whose error or doubt in faith cannot be hidden by any excuse. But an occult heretic is said to be someone whose error or doubt in faith remains sufficiently hidden.
A public heretic is someone who openly adheres to some heretical sect. But a private heretic is a person who does not openly adhere to any heretical sect.

=== Church membership ===
Robert Bellarmine and most modern Catholic theologians (such as Palmieri, Billot, Straub, and Mersch) consider that occult heretics "remain members of the Church, because the loss of membership of the Church, just as much as its acquisition, on account of the visibility of the Church, can only result from external legally ascertainable facts"; Ludwig Ott deems this opinion as "more probable".

According to Ott, manifest heretics, even when they are only heretic materially, are not part of the Catholic Church. He adds that manifest material heretics "do not belong to the body of the Church, that is to the legal commonwealth of the Church. However, this does not prevent them from belonging spiritually to the Church by their desire to belong to the Church (votum Ecclesiae) and through this, achieving justification and salvation".

Salaverri and Nicolau give the following summary of theological opinions:

That formal and manifest heretics are not members of the body of the Church, can well be said to be a unanimous opinion among Catholics.

a) That formal, but occult, heretics are not members of the Church, is defended by some authors, such as Suárez, Molina, Billuart, Franzelin, Michelitsch, Stolz, Fraghi, Journet, Zapelena, and a few others. But the contrary opinion is more common.

b) That merely material heretics, even if manifest, are members of the Church, is argued by Franzelin, De Groot, D'Herbigny, Caperan, Terrien, and a few others. But the contrary opinion is more common.

Salaverri and Nicolau, for their part, consider that material (even if manifest) heretics along with occult heretics are part of the Catholic Church.

=== Degrees ===
There are four degrees of heresy in the Catholic Church according to the Catholic Encyclopedia:

1. Pertinacious adhesion to a doctrine contradictory to a point of faith clearly defined by the Catholic Church is heresy pure and simple, heresy in the first degree
2. If the doctrine in question has not been expressly defined or is not clearly proposed as an article of faith in the ordinary, authorized teaching of the Catholic Church, an opinion opposed to it is styled sententia haeresi proxima, that is, an opinion approaching heresy
3. Next, a doctrinal proposition, without directly contradicting a received dogma, may yet involve logical consequences at variance with revealed truth. Such a proposition is not heretical, it is a propositio theologice erronea, that is, erroneous in theology
4. Lastly, the opposition to an article of faith may not be strictly demonstrable, but only reach a certain degree of probability. In that case the doctrine is termed sententia de haeresi suspecta, haeresim sapiens (scholarly heretic); that is, an opinion suspected, or savouring, of heresy

Other classifications of theological censures exist.

== History ==
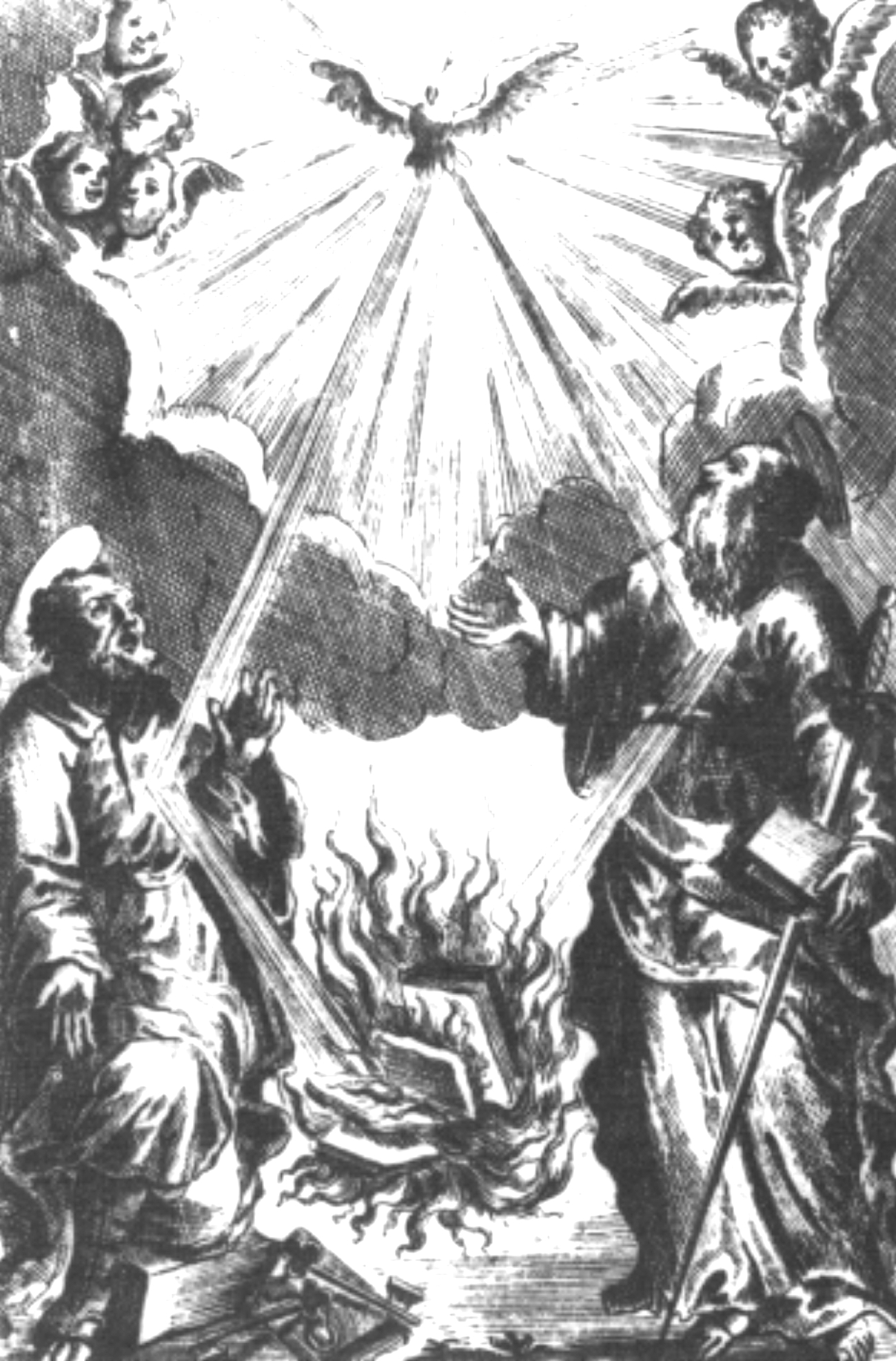
This 1711 illustration for the Index Librorum Prohibitorum depicts the Holy Ghost supplying the fire burning books.

In the thirteenth century heresy was defined by Robert Grosseteste as "an opinion chosen by human preference contrary to holy scripture, publicly avowed and obstinately held", a conscious intellectual choice not a private doubt.

It was further elaborated by Thomas Aquinas as "a species of infidelity in men who, having professed the faith of Christ, corrupt its dogmas". Aquinas notes:

The right Christian faith consists in giving one's voluntary assent to Christ in all that truly belongs to His teaching. There are, therefore, two ways of deviating from Christianity: the one by refusing to believe in Christ Himself, which is the way of infidelity, common to Pagans and Jews; the other by restricting belief to certain points of Christ's doctrine selected and fashioned at pleasure, which is the way of heretics. The subject-matter of both faith and heresy is, therefore, the deposit of the faith, that is, the sum total of truths revealed in Scripture and Tradition as proposed to our belief by the Church. The believer accepts the whole deposit as proposed by the Church; the heretic accepts only such parts of it as commend themselves to his own approval.

According to Jesuit historian David Collins, in the roughly 700 years following the demise of the Roman Empire, there was only a single known execution of a heretic. However, in 1160s, Western European states adopted more extreme policies.

Then-Catholic priest Martin Luther made comments that were later summarized in the 1520 bull Exsurge Domine as: "Haereticos comburi est contra voluntatem Spiritus" ("It is contrary to the Spirit to burn heretics"). This summary was one of the statements specifically censured in this papal bull. When Luther did not accept the bull nor to give a broad recantation of his writings, he was excommunicated in the subsequent 1521 papal bull Decet Romanum Pontificem.

Jansenism was an early modern theological movement popular in France in the mid-seventeenth century, that held that only a certain portion of humanity was predestined to be saved. The heresy according to Roman Catholic doctrine, lay in denying the role of free will in the acceptance and use of grace.

The last case of a heretic being executed was that of the schoolmaster Cayetano Ripoll, denounced for teaching deism by the local Board of Faith Junta de Fe, then tried by the state and hanged to death 26 July 1826 in Valencia after a two-year trial.

== Modern Roman Catholic response to Protestantism ==
Some of the doctrines of Protestantism that the Catholic Church considers heretical are: sola scriptura, sola fide, the universal priesthood of all believers, and the denial of transubstantiation.

In his book The Meaning of Christian Brotherhood, Cardinal Ratzinger wrote:

The difficulty in the way of giving an answer is a profound one. Ultimately it is due to the fact that there is no appropriate category in Catholic thought for the phenomenon of Protestantism today (one could say the same of the relationship to the separated churches of the East). It is obvious that the old category of 'heresy' is no longer of any value. Heresy, for Scripture and the early Church, includes the idea of a personal decision against the unity of the Church, and heresy's characteristic is pertinacia, the obstinacy of him who persists in his own private way. This, however, cannot be regarded as an appropriate description of the spiritual situation of the Protestant Christian. In the course of a now centuries-old history, Protestantism has made an important contribution to the realization of Christian faith, fulfilling a positive function in the development of the Christian message and, above all, often giving rise to a sincere and profound faith in the individual non-Catholic Christian, whose separation from the Catholic affirmation has nothing to do with the pertinacia characteristic of heresy. Perhaps we may here invert a saying of St. Augustine's: that an old schism becomes a heresy. The very passage of time alters the character of a division, so that an old division is something essentially different from a new one. Something that was once rightly condemned as heresy cannot later simply become true, but it can gradually develop its own positive ecclesial nature, with which the individual is presented as his church and in which he lives as a believer, not as a heretic. This organization of one group, however, ultimately has an effect on the whole. The conclusion is inescapable, then: Protestantism today is something different from heresy in the traditional sense, a phenomenon whose true theological place has not yet been determined.

== See also ==
- Heresy in Christianity
- List of heresies in the Catholic Church
- Latae sententiae and ferendae sententiae
- Excommunication in the Catholic Church
