= Theological censure =

Negative Catholic judgment of a belief

In Roman Catholic theology, a theological censure is a doctrinal judgment (censure) by which the Catholic Church or Catholic theologians stigmatize(s) certain teachings or opinions as detrimental to faith or morals or both.

Theological censures have been described as the "negative corollaries" of theological notes; while theological notes qualify positively beliefs and doctrines, said beliefs and doctrines are qualified negatively by theological censures.

The theological censures' "enumeration, division and evaluation" vary between authors.

Theological censures are only directed at teachings or opinions; this distinguishes them from canonical censures which are spiritual punishments imposed on people.

== History ==
William of Ockham appears to have been the first medieval theologian to attempt to formally categorise the theological censure of his time.

== Authority of the censures ==
"[T]he supreme organs for [theological] notes and censures (and exclusively so for infallible matters) are the Pope and the Ecumenical Councils. Limited competences attaches to the Roman Congregations, Provincial Synods (episcopal conferences) and the individual bishops and major superiors of religious orders. The whole people of God is charged with the safeguarding of the true faith. Theologians have a special responsibility and thus are especially qualified to give theological notes [and censures] [...] though their authority is not one of jurisdiction. Their notes [and censures] have the weight of 'professional' opinions and have often influenced the magisterium".

"If [a theological censure] be pronounced by the Teaching Authority of the Church it is an authoritative or judicial judgment (censura authentica or iudicialis). If it be pronounced by Theological Science it is a private doctrinal judgment (censura doctrinalis)".

== Various classifications ==
=== Catholic Encyclopedia ===
Theological censures are divided into three groups by the Catholic Encyclopedia; this division is according to as the censures bear principally upon either 1) the degree, or 2) the expression, or 3) the consequences, of condemned propositions:

1) A proposition is
- heretical (Latin: hæretica) when it goes directly and immediately against a revealed or defined dogma, or dogma de fide;
- erroneous (erronea) when it contradicts only a certain (certa) theological conclusion (i.e., a truth clearly deduced from two premises, the first premises being an article of faith, the second being a natural certain reflexion).
2) A proposition is
- ambiguous (ambigua) when it is worded so as to present two or more senses, one of which is objectionable;
- captious (captiosa) when acceptable words are made to express objectionable thoughts;
- evil-sounding (male sonans) when improper words are used to express otherwise acceptable truths;
- offensive when verbal expression is such as rightly to shock the Catholic sense and delicacy of faith (piarum aurium offensiva, offensive to pious ears).
3) In the third category fall propositions subsannativa religionis (derisive of religion), decolorativa candoris ecclesiæ (defacing the beauty of the Church), subversiva hierarchiæ (subversive of the hierarchy), eversiva regnorum (destructive of governments), scandalosa, perniciosa, periculosa in moribus (scandalous, pernicious, dangerous to morals), blasphema, idolatra, superstitiosa, magica (blasphemous, leading to idolatry, superstition, sorcery), arrogans, acerba (arrogant, harsh), etc.
This enumeration, though incomplete, sufficiently draws the aim of the third group of censures; they are directed against such propositions as would imperil religion in general, the Church's sanctity, unity of government and hierarchy, civil society, morals in general, or the virtue of religion, Christian meekness, and humility in particular.

There are four degrees of heresy according to the Catholic Encyclopedia in another one of its articles:

1. Pertinacious adhesion to a doctrine contradictory to a point of faith clearly defined by the Catholic Church is heresy pure and simple, heresy in the first degree
2. If the doctrine in question has not been expressly defined or is not clearly proposed as an article of faith in the ordinary, authorized teaching of the Catholic Church, an opinion opposed to it is styled sententia haeresi proxima, that is, an opinion approaching heresy
3. Next, a doctrinal proposition, without directly contradicting a received dogma, may yet involve logical consequences at variance with revealed truth. Such a proposition is not heretical, it is a propositio theologice erronea, that is, erroneous in theology
4. Lastly, the opposition to an article of faith may not be strictly demonstrable, but only reach a certain degree of probability. In that case the doctrine is termed sententia de haeresi suspecta, haeresim sapiens (scholarly heretic); that is, an opinion suspected, or savouring, of heresy

=== Ludwig Ott ===
Catholic theologian Ludwig Ott describes the following censures, which he says are the most common theological censures:

1. Heretical proposition (Latin: propositio haeretica): "This signifies that the proposition is opposed to a formal dogma"
2. Proposition proximate to heresy (propositio haeresi proxima): "the proposition is opposed to a truth which is proximate to the Faith (sententia fidei proxima)"
3. Proposition savouring of, or suspect of, heresy (propositio haeresim sapiens or de haeresi suspecta)
4. Erroneous proposition (propositio erronea): "opposed to a truth which is proposed by the Church as a truth intrinsically connected with a revealed truth (error in fide ecclesiastica) or opposed to the common teaching of theologians (error theologicus)"
5. False proposition (propositio falsa): "contradicting a dogmatic fact"
6. Temerarious proposition (propositio temeraria): "deviating without reason from the general teaching"
7. Proposition offensive to pious ears (propositio piarum aurium offensiva): "offensive to religious feeling"
8. Proposition badly expressed (propositio male sonans): "subject to misunderstanding by reason of its method of expression"
9. Captious proposition (propositio captiosa): "reprehensible because of its intentional ambiguity"
10. Proposition exciting scandal (propositio scandalosa)

=== Sommaire de théologie dogmatique ===
The Sommaire de théologie dogmatique proposes the following degrees of theological censure:

1. Heretic: if the proposition "directly and immediately opposes a truth formally revealed and defined or proposed as such by the solemn or ordinary and universal Magisterium of the church"
2. Proximate to heresy: if the proposition "opposes a truth presented by the common teaching of [l'ensemble des] theologians as certain and soon to be defined". An example of one of those truths is the universal Mediation of the Virgin Mary
3. Scholarly heretic: if the proposition "can be interpreted in either a Catholic or heretical sense; but, juging by the circumstances, the latter sense prevails. Example: someone who is rightly suspected of Protestantism affirms insistently that faith alone justifies, and never affirms that works are also necessary for justification" (see Sola fide)
4. Erroneous: the proposition "opposes a strictly speaking theological conclusion". An example of erroneous proposition is: "each Bishop in his diocese is independent of the Sovereign Pontiff, since he [each Bishop] holds from Christ himself the powers necessary to govern his diocese"
5. Positively temerarious: the proposition "having for itself no probable reason, [...] opposes a doctrine universally received in the Church". An example of a positively temerarious proposition is: "there is no Limbo for children who died without baptism"
6. Negatively temerarious: the proposition "without probable foundation, [...] affirms a theological doctrine which has never been taught by the Church". An example of a negatively temerarious proposition is: "some more people other than the Holy Virgin have been exempted from the original sin"
7. Offensive to pious ears: "[w]hen the terms used go against the respect due to holy things"
8. Badly expressed [Mal sonnante]: "[i]f the words are improper and open to misinterpretation"
9. Scandalous, seducing: "[i]f the professed doctrine leads to evil"
10. Seditious: "[i]f the doctrine leads to rebellion against the legitimate Authority"
11. Schismatic: "[i]f it leads to separation from the Church"

=== John Hardon ===
Catholic theologian John Hardon states:

A heretical proposition is opposed to a revealed dogma; proximate to heresy is opposed to a truth commonly held to be revealed; erroneous is opposed to conclusions derived from revelation; false is opposed to dogmatic facts; temerarious deviates from the accepted teaching of the Church; badly expressed is subject to misunderstanding; captious is reprehensible because of its intentional ambiguity; and scandalous because it gives rise to error among the faithful.

== See also ==
- Theologoumenon
- Anathema#Catholicism
