= Priest–penitent privilege in France =

Priest–penitent privilege in France and the western portion of Europe received public recognition at a very early date owing to the perceived sacredness of the Seal of the Confessional.

== History ==
=== Early writings ===
Among the Capitularies of Charlemagne, the first capitulary of the year 813 demands:

... that inquiry shall be made whether what is reported from Austrasia (Austria) [de partibus Austriæ] is true or not, viz., that priests, for reward received, make known thieves from their confessions [quod presbyteri de confessionibus accepto pretio manifestent latrones].

— Article XXVII

The "Austrasia - Austria" here referred to is the eastern part of the old Western Empire, then called Austria.

In France it was an established principle not only that a confessor could not be examined in a court of justice as to matters revealed to him in confession, but that admissions made in confession, if disclosed, might not be received or acted upon by the court and would not be evidence. Merlin^{(see Talk:Priest-penitent privilege in France#Merlin)} and Guyot^{(see Talk:Priest-penitent privilege in France#Guyot)}, distinguished writers on French jurisprudence, cite a decree of the Parliament of Normandy deciding the principle and laying down that a person charged upon the evidence of a confession cannot be convicted and must be discharged. They cite decrees of other Parliaments laying down the sacredness of the seal of confession. Among others, they cite a decree of the Parlement of Paris in 1580, that a confessor could not be compelled to disclose the accomplices of a certain criminal, whose names the criminal had confessed to him when going to the scaffold. These decrees were judicial. The appellant's counsel in the Quebec case of Gill v. Bouchard, yields much valuable information on the French law upon the subject. In that argument there is cited a decree by the Parliament of Flanders in 1776 declaring that the evidence of a witness who repeated a confession which he had overheard was not admissible, and reversing the judgment which had been passed on the admission of such evidence.

Charles Muteau, another distinguished French jurist, speaks in clear and emphatic terms of the sacredness of the seal, citing, also, various instances in proof. He tells us in a foot-note of a certain Marquise de Brinvilliers, among whose papers, after she had been arrested, was found a general confession (apparently made in pursuance of religious discipline) accusing herself of an attempt to murder various members of her family. The court trying her, he says, absolutely ignored this confession: Muteau gives us a quotation from rodius in Pandect f.73, in which rodius says:

The man who has confessed to a priest is not held to have confessed.

In Bonino's Case, which is cited in the course of the appellant's argument in Gill v. Bouchard as having been decided by the Court of Cassation of Turin (at that time part of the French Empire) in February 1810, and as being reported in the Journal du Palais périodique, VIII, 667, the court is reported to have decided that an open avowal made by a penitent in consequence of his being counselled in confession to make such avowal ought not to be received in evidence against him.

Merlin and Muteau tell us that formerly the breach of the seal by a priest was punishable with death. Guyot says that canonists are not agreed as to whether the breach is an offence recognizable by the civil courts [si c'est un délit commun ou un cas royal], but that several canonists maintain that the civil judges ought to have cognizance of it. This appears to be his own view because the breach is a grave crime against religion and society, a public scandal, and a sacrilege. He cites, however, a decree of the Parlement of Toulouse of 16 February 1679, deciding that the cognizance of the offence belonged to the ecclesiastical judge.

=== High treason ===
All these three writers except from the general inviolability of the seal the single case of high treason, that is, an offence against the person of the king or against the safety of the State. Merlin and Guyot, appear to base their authority for this exception on a statement by Laurent Bouchel (1559–1629), a distinguished French advocate who practised before the French Parliament. He was also an expert in canon law and he wrote a work on the Decrees of the Gallican Church. They cite Bouchel as stating that:

...on account of the gravity and importance of the crime of high treason the confessor is excused if he reveals it that he [Bouchel] does not know if one ought to go further and say that the priest who may have kept such a matter secret and not have denounced it to the magistrate would be guilty and would be an accomplice; that one cannot doubt that a person who is informed of a conspiracy against the person and estate of the prince would be excommunicated and anathematized if he did not denounce it to the magistrate to have it punished.

It is to be noticed that this statement by Bouchel, as cited by Merlin and Guyot, does not mention any decree or decision or any other authority supporting it. Muteau, in excepting high treason, appears to base the exception mainly upon a decree of Louis XI, of 22 December 1477, enjoining "upon all persons whatsoever" to denounce certain crimes against the safety of the State and the person of the king which might come to their knowledge. He says that the theologians have invariably maintained that confessors were not included among persons bound to reveal high treason. Muteau points out, also, that the Inquisition itself uniformly laid down that "never, in no interest," should the seal of confession be violated.

=== Dalloz ===
Désiré Dalloz in his learned and comprehensive work on jurisprudence, in which the whole of French law is compiled and commented on under the numerous subjects affected by it, says that as the laws of France (his work was published in 1853, when he was an advocate practising at the imperial Court of Paris) protect the rules of ecclesiastical discipline, they could not exact from the clergyman, in breach of these rules, the disclosure of secrets revealed to him in the exercise of his ministry. Citing the canon of the Fourth Lateran Council enjoining the secrecy of the seal, which, he tells us, only reproduces an older rule going back to the year 600, he observes that the inviolability declared by it is absolute and without distinction.

The decision of the Court of Cassation in Laveine's Case (30 November 1810, Recueil général des lois et des arrêts, XI, i, 49) affords support, not by the actual decision, but by certain words used in it, to the contention for the exception of high treason, while the actual decision is commonly cited as one of the leading judicial authorities for the general principle of the immunity of the confessor. It was a case in which restitution had been made by a thief through a priest outside confession, the thief, however, stating at the time that he regarded the conversation as being to his confessor and as made under the seal of confession, to which the priest assented. The court of first instance held that only a communication received in sacramental confession would be privileged and that, therefore, the priest was bound in this case to disclose the name of the thief. The Court of Cassation reversed this decision. Its judgment commences with a reference to the existence of the Concordat of 1801 and to the result that the Catholic religion is placed under the protection of the State, and it goes on to say that a confessor may not be ordered to disclose secret communications made to him in the exercise of his calling, "excepting those cases which appertain directly to the safety of the State" [hors les cas qui tiennent immédiatement à la sûreté de l'état]. Commenting on these words, Dalloz says that the jurist, Jean Marie Emmanuel Legraverend (1776–1827), admits the exception. Dalloz appears not to agree with it:

The oath prescribed by the Concordat and the Organic Articles is no longer used: even if it were, the obligation which would result from it to disclose to the Government what was being plotted to its prejudice in the diocese or elsewhere could not apply to confession. The duty of informing having been, moreover, struck out from our laws, at the time of the revision of the penal code in 1832, it could not subsist in such a case.

=== Article 378 ===
By Art. 378 of the Code pénal impérial français, the French Penal Code promulgated in 1810:

... doctors, surgeons, and other officers of health as well as apothecaries, mid-wives, and all other persons who, by their status (état) or profession are the depositaries of secrets confided to them, revealing such secrets, except in cases in which the law obliges them to inform [hors les cas où la loi les oblige à se porter dénonciateurs] shall be punished with imprisonment from one to six months, and with a fine of from 100 to 500 francs.

The exception, mentioned in the article, of persons obliged by law to be informers, as pointed out by Dalloz, became obsolete because Arts 103–107, which dealt with the obligation of informing, were repealed by the law of 28 April 1832. Dr. H. F. Rivière, counsellor to the Court of Cassation, in his edition of the French Codes (Code Pénal, p. 68) has a note to that effect. Armand Dalloz, the brother and collaborator of the author of the Jurisprudence générale, says in another work:

Supposing that one may admit a derogation from this principle in favour of the interests of the State compromised by some plot, which is, at least, very debatable, one must, nevertheless maintain in private cases the obligation of secrecy in its integrity.

The same writer says that the exception of the confessor is deduced from the principle of Art. 378, from the needs of the soul and, above all, from the laws which have recognized the Catholic religion. He continues:

And it would be repugnant that one could, in any case at all, force the religious conscience of the confessor in constraining him to break, in defiance of one of the most imperious duties of his office, the seal of confession.

In Fay's Case [(4 December 1891), Recueil général des lois et des arrêts, 1892, 1, 473] the Court of Cassation held that the ministers of religions legally recognized are obliged to keep secret communications made to them by reason of their functions; and that with regard to priests no distinction is made as to whether the secret is made known in confession or outside it, and the obligation of secrecy is absolute and is a matter of public policy. The annotator of the report begins his notes by saying that it is a universally admitted point that the exemption from giving evidence is necessarily extended to priests with regard to the matters confided to them in confession. He cites, among other cases, one of the Court of Cassation in Belgium declaring that there has never been any doubt that priests are not bound to disclose confessions in the witness box. The Concordat of 1801 was abrogated by the 1905 French law on the separation of Church and State. However, some terms of the Concordat are still in effect in the Alsace-Moselle region, as it was controlled by the German Empire at the time of the law's passage and today maintains a specific local law. The Catholic religion being no longer established in France under the auspices of the State, part of the grounds adduced for some of the decisions cited above cease to hold good. The 1810 Penal Code was superseded by a new Penal Code in 1994.

=== 2020's ===
In October 2021, a report which investigated sexual abuse of children by Catholic clergy and lay persons employed by the church, recommended to require priests to notify the police about child abuse cases that are mentioned in confession. Bishop Eric de Moulins-Beaufort rejected the recommendation. Interior minister Darmanin told him in a meeting that priests are obliged to report cases of sexual violence against children, even when heard in the confessional, to the police. The spokesperson for the French bishops' conference later said that they are not required to do that.

== Sources ==
- (in French) Code pénal impérial français
