= Appeal as from an abuse =

Term in the canon law of the Catholic Church

"Appeal as from an abuse" (French: appel comme d'abus) is a legal term applied in the canon law of the Catholic Church, meaning originally a legal appeal as recourse to the civil forum (court) against the usurpation by the ecclesiastical forum of the rights of civil jurisdiction. It could also mean (vice versa) a recourse to the ecclesiastical forum against the usurpation by the civil forum of the rights of ecclesiastical jurisdiction.

Thus defined, the "appeal as from an abuse" had as its object to safeguard equally the rights both of the State and of the Catholic Church. An abuse would be an act on either hand, without due authority, beyond the limits of their respective ordinary and natural jurisdictions. In practice the use of such appeals was important, historically, as a way to undermine the power of church courts.

== Canon law ==
The canons did not exclude a recourse to the civil authority when the acts of an ecclesiastical judge invaded the domain of the civil authority, especially as reciprocity gave the ecclesiastical authority the right to repel with the same weapons any usurpation by the lay judge to the damage of the rights of the Church. Thus also a recourse to the supreme civil ruler was not deemed amiss when an ecclesiastical court undertook a cause belonging to the competency of a higher ecclesiastical court, and the ruler was asked merely to forward it to the proper tribunal without, however, claiming to delegate to it any jurisdiction. Perhaps the first formal manifestation of this appeal in the legitimate sense occurred in the fourteenth century.

== History ==
Ecclesiastical judges acquired a reputation for learning and equity, and by the good will of the State, not merely ecclesiastical, but many civil cases of the laity were adjudicated by them. in 1329 complaint was brought to King Philip de Valois by the advocate general, Peter de Cugnières, that the civil tribunals were fast lapsing into contempt, and were being abandoned. The purport of the complaint was to restrict the competency of the ecclesiastical tribunals to their own legitimate fields. Bickerings between the two forums were henceforth frequent. Even the Catholic states, after the beginning of the sixteenth century, advanced far in the way of frequent ruptures with the Church.

When the Protestant states had acquired control and supervision over the newly reformed bodies even in their spiritual relations, the Catholic states, particularly France, strove to limit the jurisdiction of the Catholic Church as far as they could without casting aside the profession of the Catholic Faith. The Pragmatic Sanction of Bourges was a serious aggression by France upon the acknowledged rights of the Church and of the Holy See. It is in France that we find the most flagrant series of encroachments upon Church jurisdiction, through pretence of appeals as from an abuse, gradually tending to the elimination of the ecclesiastical forum.

During the seventeenth century the French Catholic clergy presented frequent memorials against the encroachments made by their kings and parliaments through constant recourse to these "appeals as from an abuse", which resulted in submitting to civil tribunals questions of definitions of faith, the proper administration of the sacraments, and the like. This brought confusion into the regulation of spiritual matters by encouraging ecclesiastics to rebel against their lawful ecclesiastical superiors. The lay tribunals undertook to adjudicate whether the ministers of the sacraments had a right to refuse them to those deemed unworthy, or the right to Christian burial of Catholics dying impenitent or under Church censures; whether interdicts or suspensions were valid; whether monastic professions should be annulled; whether the bishop's permission was necessary for preaching; whether a specified marriage was contrary or not to the Gospel; and also to decide the justice of canonical privations of benefices. Many other subjects intimately connected with the teaching of the Church were brought before lay tribunals, and unappealable decisions rendered in open contradiction to the canons, as can easily be surmised both from the absence of theological knowledge, and from the visible animus shown in decisions that undertook to subject the spiritual power of the Church to the dictates of transient politics.

Interference was mostly owing to courtier-canonists who flattered the secular rulers by dwelling upon the right of protection over the Church conceded in early days to the Christian Roman Emperors. The Church was recognized as autonomous in all things of the divine law and in matters of ecclesiastical discipline. When rulers like Charlemagne seemed to take upon themselves undue authority, insisting upon certain canons, the bishops claimed their sole right to govern the Church. Even in mixed assemblies of bishops and nobles and princes, the bishops insisted that the civil power should not encroach upon the rights of the Church, e. g. in the Council of Narbonne (788).

Zaccaria recognized, however, that in his day (the eighteenth century), as well as in former ages, the Catholic rulers of Catholic States, in their quality of protectors of the Church, might receive a recourse from ecclesiastics in ecclesiastical matters, in order that justice might be done them by their ordinary ecclesiastical judges, not as deputies of the civil rulers, but as ordinary judges in their own forum. In her concordats with Catholic states the Catholic Church granted to several that the civil cases of clerics, and such as concern the property and temporal rights of churches, as well as benefices and other ecclesiastical foundations, may be brought before the civil courts.

== Modern relationship ==
All ecclesiastical causes, and those that concern the Faith, sacraments, morals, sacred functions, and rights connected with the sacred ministry, belong to the ecclesiastical forum, both in regard of persons and of matter (cf. Concordat with Ecuador in 1881). In the United States, as decreed by the Third Provincial Council of Baltimore (1837), the church law is that if any ecclesiastical person or member of a religious body, male or female, should cite an ecclesiastic or a religious before a civil court on a question of a purely ecclesiastical nature, he should know that he falls under the censures decreed by canon law.

The Congregation of Propaganda in its comment explained that, in mixed cases, where the persons may be ecclesiastical, but the things about which there is question may be temporal or of one's household, this rule cannot be enforced, especially in countries in which the civil government is not in the hands of Catholics, and where, unless recourse is had to the civil courts, there is not the means or the power of enforcing an ecclesiastical decision for the protection or recovery of one's own. A special proviso was made by Propaganda for the United States (17 August 1886), that if a priest should bring a cleric before a civil tribunal on an ecclesiastical or other question without permission from the bishop he could be forced to withdraw the case by the infliction of penalties and censures, yet the bishop must not refuse the permission if the parties have ineffectually attempted a settlement before him. If the bishop is to be cited, the permission of the Holy See is required.

By a special declaration of Propaganda (6 September 1886), a cleric's transfer of a claim to a layman for the purpose of evading the censures is checked by the requirement of the consent of the bishop to such transfer, if made for the purpose of the suit. Justice Redfield says in reference to the United States generally: "The decision of ecclesiastical courts or officers having, by the rules or laws of the bodies to which they belong, jurisdiction of such questions, or the right to decide them, will be held conclusive in all courts of the civil administration, and no question involved in such decisions will be revised or reviewed in the civil courts, except those pertaining to the jurisdiction of such courts or officers to determine such questions according to the laws or the usage of the bodies they represent." Justice Strong, of the Supreme Court of the United States, speaks of the Church as "an interior organization within a religious society", and adds: "I think it may be safely asserted as a general principle that whenever questions of discipline, of faith, of Church rule, of membership, or of office, have been decided by the Church, in its own modes of decision, civil law tribunals accept these decisions as final and apply them as made."
