= Dogma in the Catholic Church =

Articles of faith

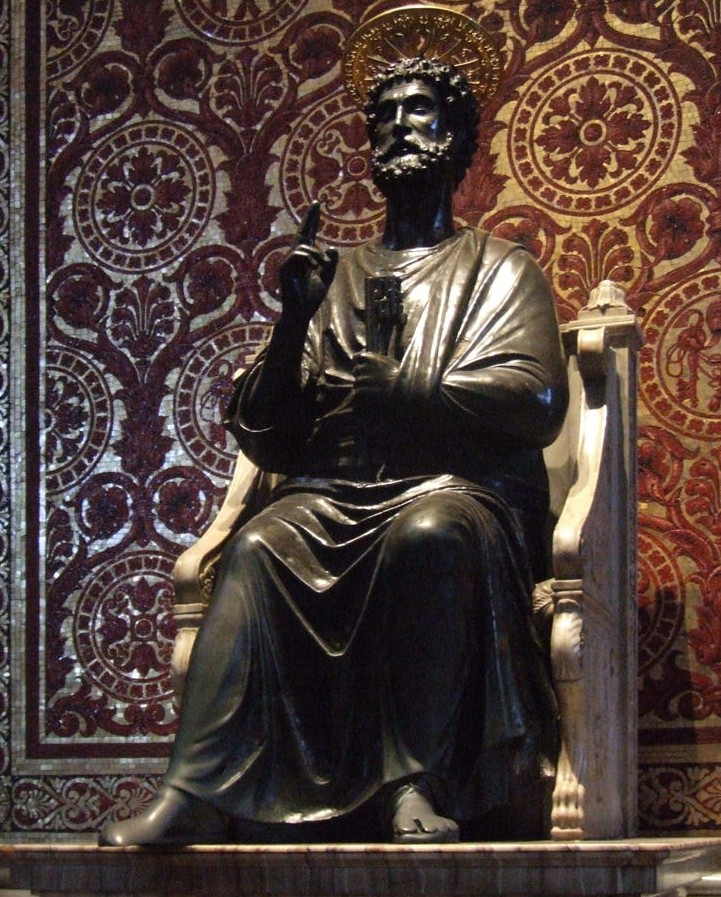
Statue of Saint Peter holding the keys of the kingdom of heaven. (Gospel of Matthew (16:18–19).

A dogma of the Catholic Church is defined as "a truth revealed by God, which the magisterium of the Church declared as binding". The Catechism of the Catholic Church states:

The Church's Magisterium asserts that it exercises the authority it holds from Christ to the fullest extent when it defines dogmas, that is, when it proposes, in a form obliging Catholics to an irrevocable adherence of faith, truths contained in divine Revelation or also when it proposes, in a definitive way, truths having a necessary connection with these.

The faithful are only required to accept a teaching as dogma if the Catholic Church clearly and specifically identifies them as dogmas. Dogmas are also adhered to by all the faithful, both of the Latin church and the Eastern Catholic churches.

== Elements: Scripture and tradition ==
The concept of dogma has two elements: 1) the public revelation of God, which is divine revelation as contained in sacred scripture (the written word) and sacred tradition, and 2) a proposition of the Catholic Church, which not only announces the dogma but also declares it binding for the faith. This may occur through an ex cathedra decision by the pope, or by a definitive statement made by an Ecumenical Council. Truths formally and explicitly revealed by God are dogmas in the strict sense when they are proposed or defined by the church, such as the articles of the Nicene Creed which are drawn from the early church councils.

Catholicism holds that the understanding of scripture continues to deepen and mature over time through the action of the Holy Spirit in the history of the church and in the understanding of that faith by Christians, all the while staying identical in essence and substance. Dei verbum states: "both sacred tradition and Sacred Scripture are to be accepted and venerated with the same sense of loyalty and reverence".

== Dogma as divine and Catholic faith ==
A dogma implies a twofold relation: to divine revelation and to the authoritative teaching of the Catholic Church.

A dogma's "strict signification is the object of both Divine Faith (Fides Divina) and Catholic Faith (Fides Catholica); it is the object of the Divine Faith (Fides Divina) by reason of its Divine Revelation; it is the object of Catholic Faith (Fides Catholica) on account of its infallible doctrinal definition by the Church. If a baptised person deliberately denies or doubts a dogma properly so-called, he is guilty of the sin of heresy [...], and automatically becomes subject to the punishment of excommunication".

At the turn of the 20th century, a group of theologians called modernists stated that dogmas did not come from God but are historical manifestations at a given time. In the encyclical Pascendi dominici gregis, Pope Pius X condemned this teaching in 1907. The Catholic position is that the content of a dogma has a divine origin, that is that said content is considered to be an expression of an objective truth that does not change.

However, truths of the faith have been declared dogmatically throughout the ages. The instance of a Pope doing this outside an Ecumenical Council is rare, though there were two instances in recent times: the Immaculate Conception of Mary in 1854 and the Assumption of Mary into heaven in 1950. Both Pope Pius IX and Pope Pius XII consulted the bishops worldwide before proclaiming these dogmas. A movement to declare a fifth Marian dogma for "Mediatrix" and "Co-Redemptrix" was underway in the 1990s, but had been opposed by the bishops at Vatican II and has faced strong opposition since.

== Early uses of the term ==
The term Dogma Catholicum was first used by Vincent of Lérins (450), referring to "what all, everywhere and always believed". In the year 565, Emperor Justinian declared the decisions of the first ecumenical councils as law "because they are true dogmata" of God.

Ecumenical Councils issue dogmas. Many dogmas – especially from the early Church (Ephesus, Chalcedon) to the Council of Trent – were formulated against specific heresies. Later dogmas (Immaculate Conception and Assumption of Mary) express the greatness of God in binding language. At the specific request of Pope John XXIII, the Second Vatican Council did not proclaim any dogmas. Instead it presented the basic elements of the Catholic faith in a more understandable, pastoral language. The last two dogmas were pronounced by Popes, Pope Pius IX in 1854 and Pope Pius XII in 1950, on the Immaculate Conception and the Assumption of the Blessed Virgin Mary respectively.

It is Catholic teaching that, with Christ and the Apostles, revelation was complete. Dogmas issued after the death of his apostles are not new, but explications of existing faith. Implicit truths are specified as explicit, as was done in the teachings on the Trinity by the ecumenical councils. Karl Rahner tries to explain this with the allegorical sentence of a husband to his wife, "I love you"; this surely implies, I am faithful to you. In the 5th century Vincent of Lérins wrote, in Commonitory, that there should be progress within the church,

on condition that it be real progress, not alteration of the faith. For progress requires that the subject be enlarged in itself, alteration, that it be transformed into something else. The intelligence, then, the knowledge, the wisdom, [...] of individuals [...] as well of [...] the whole Church, ought, in the course of ages and centuries, to increase and make much and vigorous progress; but yet only in its own kind; that is to say, in the same doctrine, in the same sense, and in the same meaning.

Vincent commented on the First Epistle to Timothy (6:20) that Timothy, for Vincent, represented "either generally the Universal Church, or in particular, the whole body of The Prelacy", whose obligation is "to possess or to communicate to others a complete knowledge of religion" called the deposit of faith. According to Vincent, the deposit of faith was entrusted and not "devised: a matter not of wit, but of learning; not of private adoption, but of public tradition." Vincent expounded that you "received gold, give gold in turn," and not a substitute or a counterfeit. Vincent explained that those who are qualified by a "divine gift" should "by wit, by skill, by learning" expound and clarify "that which formerly was believed, though imperfectly apprehended" – to understand "what antiquity venerated without understanding" and teach "the same truths" in a new way. The church uses this text in its interpretation of dogmatic development. In 1870, the First Vatican Council quoted from Commonitory and stated, in the dogmatic constitution Dei Filius, that "meaning of the sacred dogmas is perpetually to be retained" once they have been declared by the Catholic Church and "there must never be a deviation from that meaning on the specious ground and title of a more profound understanding." In 1964, the Second Vatican Council further developed this in Lumen Gentium. (Note: "The entire body of the faithful [...] cannot err in matters of belief" when the people of God manifests "discernment in matters of faith when [...] they show universal agreement in matters of faith and morals." That discernment "is exercised under the guidance of the sacred teaching authority, in faithful and respectful order to which the people of God accepts that which is not just the word of men but truly the word of God. Through it, the people of God adheres [...] to the faith given once and for all to the saints, penetrates it more deeply with right thinking, and applies it more fully in its life.")

== Classification ==
According to Catholic theologian Ludwig Ott:

Dogmas are classified:

a) According to their content as: General Dogmas (dogmata generalia) and Special Dogmas (dogmata specialia). To the former belong the fundamental truths of Christianity, to the latter the individual truths contained therein.

b) According to their relation with Reason as: Pure Dogmas (dogmata pura) and Mixed Dogmas (dogmata mixta). The former we know solely through Divine Revelation, e.g., The Trinity (mysteries), the latter by Natural Reason also, e.g., The Existence of God.

c) According to the mode by which the Church proposes them, as: Formal Dogmas (dogmata formalia) and Material Dogmas (dogmata materialia). The former are proposed for belief by the Teaching Authority of the Church as truths of Revelation; the latter are not so proposed, for which reason they are not Dogmas in the strict sense.

d) According to their relation with salvation as: Necessary Dogmas (dogmata necessaria) and Non-necessary Dogmas (dogmata non-necessaria). The former must be explicitly believed by all in order to achieve eternal salvation; for the latter implicit faith (fides implicita) suffices (cf. Hebr. II, 6).

== Theological certainty ==
The magisterium of the church is directed to guard, preserve and teach divine truths which God has revealed with infallibility (de fide). A rejection of church magisterial teachings is a de facto rejection of the divine revelation. It is considered the mortal sin of heresy if the heretical opinion is held with full knowledge of the church's opposing dogmas. The infallibility of the magisterium extends also to teachings which are deduced from such truths (fides ecclesiastica). These church teachings or "Catholic truths" (veritates catholicae) are not a part of the divine revelation, yet are intimately related to it. The rejection of these "secondary" teachings is heretical, and entails loss of full communion with the Catholic Church. More degrees of theological certainty exist. Those different degrees are called theological notes.

== Examples of dogmatic definitions ==
=== Ecumenical councils ===
- Nicaea I: divine filiation, Jesus is truly God
- Ephesus: Mary is the Mother of God
- Chalcedon: Jesus is true man, with a human body and a human soul
- Constantinople III: Jesus has a human will and a divine will
- Nicaea II: holy images may be created and are owed veneration, not adoration
- Vatican I: papal infallibility

=== Ex cathedra ===
- Pius IX: Immaculate Conception of Mary
- Pius XII: Assumption of Mary

== Papal bulls and encyclicals ==
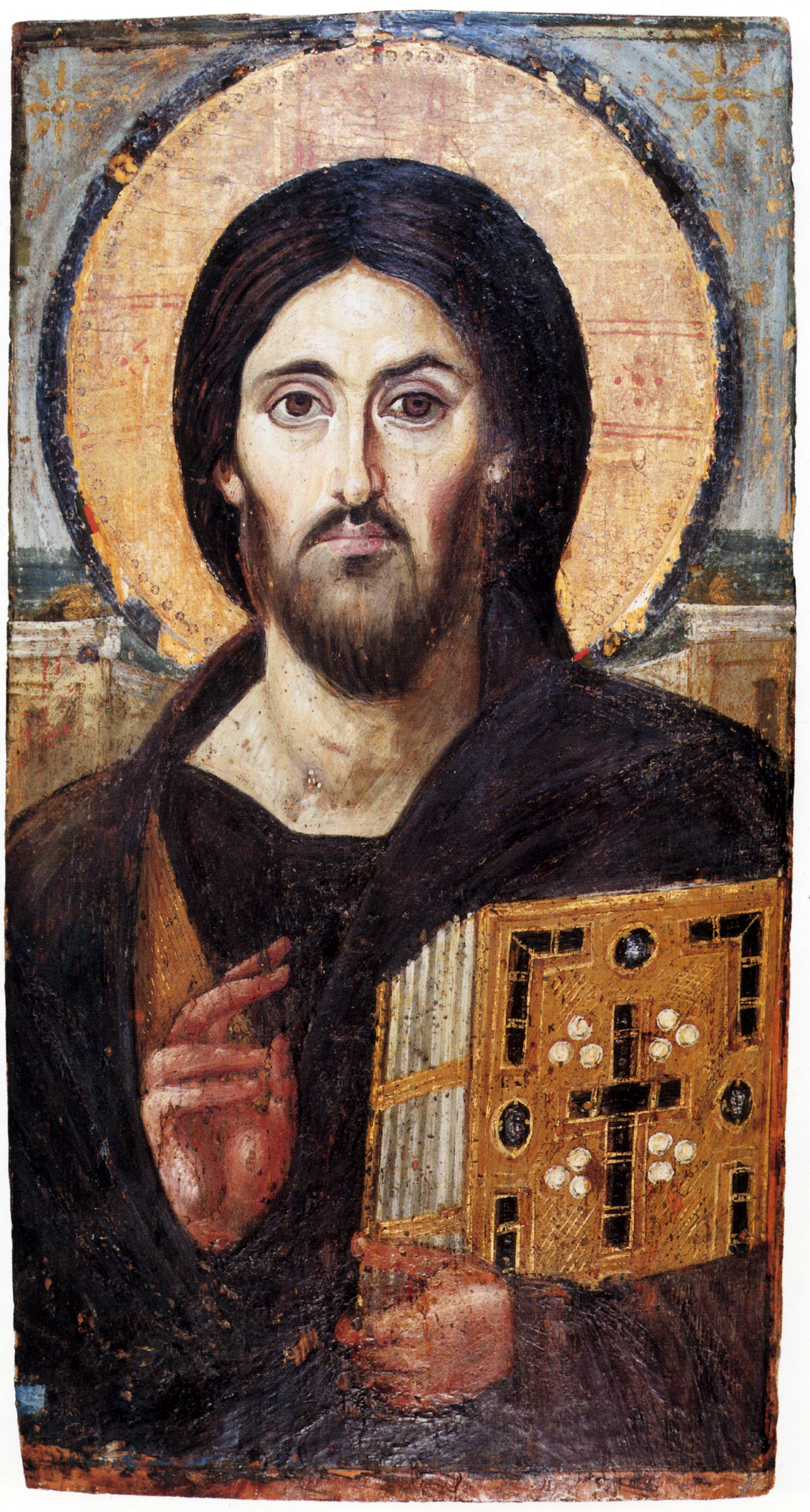
The oldest surviving panel icon of Christ Pantocrator, c. 6th century.

Pope Pius XII stated in Humani generis that papal encyclicals, even when they are not ex cathedra, can nonetheless be sufficiently authoritative to end theological debate on a particular question:

Nor must it be thought that what is expounded in Encyclical Letters does not of itself demand consent, since in writing such Letters the Popes do not exercise the supreme power of their Teaching Authority. For these matters are taught with the ordinary teaching authority, of which it is true to say: "He who heareth you, heareth me" (Luke 10:16); and generally what is expounded and inculcated in Encyclical Letters already for other reasons appertains to Catholic doctrine. But if the Supreme Pontiffs in their official documents purposely pass judgment on a matter up to that time under dispute, it is obvious that that matter, according to the mind and will of the Pontiffs, cannot be any longer considered a question open to discussion among theologians.

The end of the theological debate is not identical, however, with dogmatization. Throughout the history of the church, its representatives have discussed whether a given papal teaching is the final word or not.

In 1773, Lorenzo Ricci, hearing rumours that Pope Clement XIV might dissolve the Jesuit Order, wrote "it is most incredible that the Deputy of Christ would state the opposite, what his predecessor Pope Clement XIII stated in the papal bull Apostolicum, in which he defended and protected us." When, a few days later, he was asked if he would accept the papal brief reverting Clement XIII and dissolving the Jesuit Order, Ricci replied that whatever the Pope decides must be sacred to everybody.

In 1995, questions arose as to whether the apostolic letter Ordinatio sacerdotalis, which upheld the Catholic teaching that only men may receive ordination, is to be understood as belonging to the deposit of faith. Pope John Paul II wrote, "Wherefore, in order that all doubt may be removed regarding a matter of great importance, a matter which pertains to the Church's divine constitution itself, in virtue of Our ministry of confirming the brethren (cf. Lk 22:32) We declare that the Church has no authority whatsoever to confer priestly ordination on women and that this judgment is to be definitively held by all the Church's faithful." Dulles, in a lecture to U.S. bishops, stated that 'Ordinatio sacerdotalis is infallible, not because of the apostolic letter or the clarification by Cardinal Joseph Ratzinger alone but because it is based on a wide range of sources, scriptures, the constant tradition of the church, and the ordinary and universal magisterium of the church: Pope John Paul II identified a truth infallibly taught over two thousand years by the church.

Critics of Ordinatio Sacerdotalis point out, though, that it was not promulgated under the extraordinary papal magisterium as an ex cathedra statement, and therefore is not considered infallible in itself.

== Apparitions and revelations ==
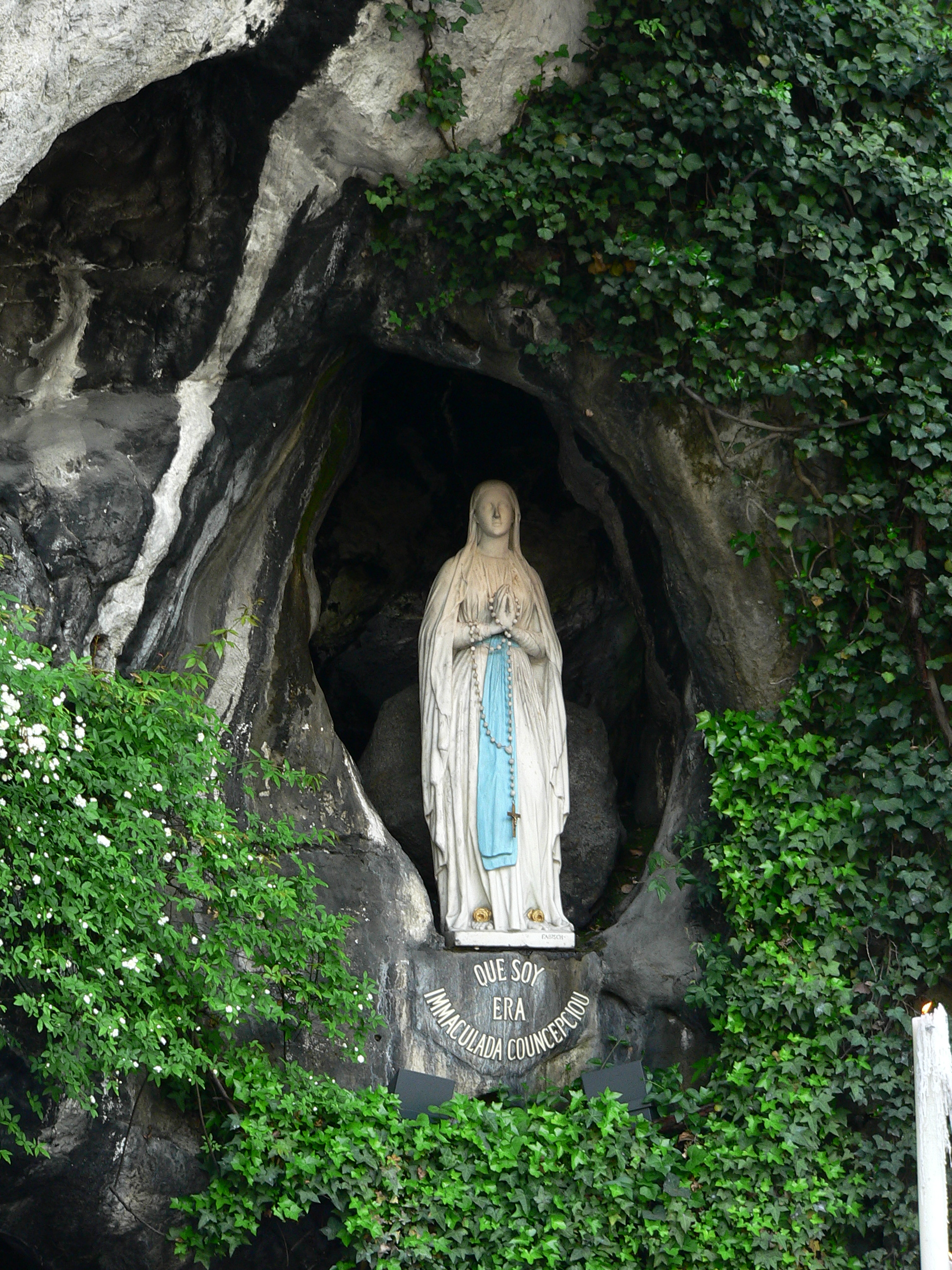
Statue of Our Lady of Lourdes. The Lourdes apparitions occurred four years after the definition of the dogma of the Immaculate Conception.

Private revelations have taken place within the Catholic Church since the very beginning. For example, the account of Our Lady of the Pillar appearing to James the Greater. However, apparitions are not a part of sacred tradition, since that would imply divine revelation is incomplete, which in turn would imply God can perfect himself. (Note: Christian faith cannot accept "revelations" that claim to surpass or correct the Revelation of which Christ is the fulfillment as is the case in certain non-Christian religions and also in certain recent sects which base themselves on such "revelations".)

The Catholic Church distinguishes between the apparitions within divine revelation – such as the risen Jesus' apparitions to the Apostles and the sign of the woman in the Book of Revelation – and apparitions without divine revelation – such as Our Lady of Lourdes and Our Lady of Fatima – because the age of divine revelation was closed with the completion of the New Testament when the last of the Apostles died. (Note: "The Christian economy, therefore, since it is the new and definitive Covenant, will never pass away; and no new public revelation is to be expected before the glorious manifestation of our Lord Jesus Christ." Yet even if god permits no new revelations, it has not been made completely explicit; it remains for Christian faith gradually to grasp its full significance over the course of the centuries.)

While Our Lady of the Pillar appeared during the Apostolic Age, the apparition is not a dogma since it is not part of the Catholic faith, in the Bible or in sacred tradition. It is a local tradition, which is distinct from sacred tradition. (Note: Tradition is to be distinguished from the various theological, disciplinary, liturgical or devotional traditions, born in the local churches over time. These are the particular forms, adapted to different places and times, in which the great Tradition is expressed. In the light of Tradition, these traditions can be retained, modified or even abandoned under the guidance of the church's magisterium.)

== Ecumenical aspects ==
Protestant theology since the reformation was largely negative on the term dogma. This changed in the 20th century, when Karl Barth in his book Kirchliche Dogmatik stated the need for systematic and binding articles of faith.

The Creed is the most comprehensive – but not complete (Note: Additional dogmas are in part precisation of clauses contained in the creed. However this may be, all of them follow technically from the clause "and the One, Holy, Catholic and Apostolic Church", in which the claim of the Church to lay down revelation infallibly is contained.) – summary of important Catholic dogmas (it was originally used during baptism ceremonies). The Creed is a part of Sunday liturgy. Because many Protestant Churches have retained the older versions of the Creed, ecumenical working groups are meeting to discuss the Creed as the basis for better understandings of dogma.

== See also ==
- Catholic dogmatic theology
- Catholic Mariology#Dogmatic teachings
- Enchiridion symbolorum, definitionum et declarationum de rebus fidei et morum
- Theological censure
- Theological notes
