= Theological notes =

Positive classification of Catholic beliefs

The theological notes or nota theologica designate a classification of certainty of beliefs in Catholic theology. While theological notes qualify positively beliefs and doctrines, said beliefs and doctrines are qualified negatively by theological censures. The theological notes' "enumeration, division and evaluation" vary between authors.

== Authority of the notes ==
"[T]he supreme organs for [theological] notes and censures (and exclusively so for infallible matters) are the Pope and the Ecumenical Councils. Limited competences attaches to the Roman Congregations, Provincial Synods (episcopal conferences) and the individual bishops and major superiors of religious orders. The whole people of God is charged with the safeguarding of the true faith. Theologians have a special responsibility and thus are especially qualified to give theological notes [and censures] [...] though their authority is not one of jurisdiction. Their notes [and censures] have the weight of 'professional' opinions and have often influenced the magisterium".

== Various classifications ==
=== Ludwig Ott ===
==== Immediately revealed truths ====
Catholic theologian Ludwig Ott considers that immediately revealed truths hold the "highest degree of certainty". "The belief due to them is based on the authority of God Revealing (fides divina), and if the Church, through its teaching, vouches for the fact that a truth is contained in Revelation, one's certainty is then also based on the authority of the Infallible Teaching Authority of the Church (fides catholica). If Truths are defined by a solemn judgment of faith (definition) of the Pope or of a General Council, they are 'de fide definita'".

==== Catholic truths ====
Ludwig Ott says that there are Catholic beliefs which are church teachings, definitively decided on by the Magisterium, but not (yet) as being divine revelations properly speaking. Ludwig Ott calls the beliefs of this level Catholic truths, and states that beliefs of this level "are as infallibly certain as dogmas proper."

Catholic truths are "doctrines and truths defined by the Church not as immediately revealed but as intrinsically connected with the truths of Revelation so that their denial would undermine the revealed truths [...]. These are proposed for belief in virtue of the infallibility of the Church in teaching doctrines of faith or morals (fides ecclesiastica)." They are called "Catholic Truths (veritates catholicae) or Ecclesiastical Teachings (doctrinae ecclesiasticae) to distinguish them from the Divine Truths or Divine Doctrines of Revelation (veritates vel doctrinae divinae)." Ott continues:

To these Catholic truths belong:

1. Theological Conclusions (conclusiones theologicae) properly so-called. By these are understood religious truths, which are derived from two premisses, of which one is an immediately revealed truth, and the other a truth of natural reason. Since one premiss is a truth of Revelation, theological conclusions are spoken of as being mediately or virtually (virtualiter) revealed. If however both premisses are immediately revealed truths, then the conclusion also must be regarded as being immediately revealed and as the object of Immediate Divine Faith (Fides Immediate Divina).

2. Dogmatic Facts (facta dogmatica). By these are understood historical facts, which are not revealed, but which are intrinsically connected with revealed truth, for example, the legality of a Pope or of a General Council, or the fact of the Roman episcopate of St. Peter. The fact that a defined text does or does not agree with the doctrine of the Catholic Faith is also, in a narrower sense, a 'dogmatic fact.' In deciding the meaning of a text the Church does not pronounce judgment on the subjective intention of the author, but on the objective sense of the text (D 1350; sensum quem verba prae se ferunt).

3. Truths of Reason, which have not been revealed, but which are intrinsically associated with a revealed truth, e.g., those philosophic truths which are presuppositions of the acts of Faith (knowledge of the supersensual, possibility of proofs of God, the spirituality of the soul, the freedom of will), or philosophic concepts, in terms of which dogma is promulgated (person, substance, transubstantiation, etc.). The Church has the right and the duty, for the protection of the heritage of Faith, of proscribing philosophic teachings which directly or indirectly endanger dogma. The [First] Vatican Council declares: Ius etiam et officium divinitus habet falsi nominis scientiam proscribendi ["{the Church} derives from God the right and the duty of proscribing false science" – Dei Filius] (D 1798).

==== Sententia fidei proxima ====
Ludwig Ott also adds the note sententia fidei proxima ("teaching proximate to faith") which refers to teachings, which are generally accepted as divine revelation by Catholic theologians but not defined as such by the Magisterium.

==== Teaching pertaining to the faith ====
Ludwig Ott further states that teaching pertaining to the faith (sententia ad fidem pertinens), or theologically certain (theologice certa), refers to theological conclusions; those are teachings without definitive approval by the Catholic Church, but "[whose] truth is guaranteed by [their] intrinsic connection with the doctrine of revelation."

==== Sententia communis ====
As per Ludwig Ott, sententia communis ("common teaching") refers to beliefs which are generally accepted by theologians, but not dogmatically asserted.

Examples of sententia communis beliefs which are cited by Ott include the power of saints in heaven to help the souls in purgatory by intercession and the conviction that dead people cannot receive sacraments.

==== Theological opinions of lesser grades ====
Ott states:

Theological opinions of lesser grades of certainty are called probable, more probable, well-founded (sententia probabilis, probabilior, bene fundata). Those which are regarded as being in agreement with the consciousness of Faith of the Church are called pious opinions (sententia pia). The least degree of certainty is possessed by the tolerated opinion (opinio tolerata), which is only weakly founded, but which is tolerated by the Church.

=== Sommaire de théologie dogmatique ===
The Sommaire de théologie dogmatique proposes the following theological notes:

1. Of Catholic faith (De Fide): when a religious truth "has been revealed by God, is contained in Sacred Scripture or Tradition and has been solemnly defined as such by the Sovereign Pontiff or by an Ecumenical Council defining EX CATHEDRA – that is with the intention of defining – assuming all the required conditions are met. — Or if a truth is presented as such by the ordinary and universal Magisterium of the Church. (Vatican I.)"
2. Of Divine faith (De Fide divina): when a religious truth "is for sure contained in Holy Scriptures, but has not been solemnly defined by the Church. E.g.: the birth of Christ in Bethlehem. The same applies to truths revealed privately by God to a person, but for that person only."
3. Catholic doctrine, certain (Certum est): "When it is a truth deduced logically from two premises, one of which is formally revealed by God, and the other known by reason alone and not revealed elsewhere, nor contained implicitly in the revealed premise. The truth thus deduced is called THEOLOGICAL CONCLUSION. Many formally but implicitly revealed truths are considered CERTAIN until they are solemnly defined."
4. Common (Sententia communis): "It is a truth taught by almost all theologians and opposed by only a few of mediocre authority, but which is nevertheless not disavowed by the Church."
5. Probable, more probable (Probabilis): "It is a proposal supported by eminent theologians approved by the Ecclesiastical Authority — and which, at the same time, is opposed by other equally eminent theologians. The degree of probability can be based either on the number and authority of theologians who support this proposition (extrinsic probability), or on the value of the arguments provided (intrinsic probability)."

=== John Hardon ===
Catholic theologian John Hardon states:

The highest degree of certitude is attached to immediately revealed truths. They are to be believed with divine faith (fides divina) and if they are also defined by the Church, then with defined divine faith (fides divina definita). If the Church defines a doctrine that is not immediately revealed, it is to be believed with ecclesiastical faith (fides ecclesiastica). A doctrine that theologians generally regard as a truth of revelation, but that has not been finally promulgated by the Church, is said to be proximate to faith (proxima fidei), and if such a truth is guaranteed as the logical conclusion from a revealed doctrine, it is called theologically certain (theologice certa). Below this level are many grades of certainty, ranging from common teaching (sententia communis), when Catholic theologians responsive to the Church's authority agree on some position, to tolerated opinions that are weakly founded but are tolerated by the Church.

=== Edward N. Peters ===
Edward N. Peters states that "many of the assertions hitherto listed by theologians with a surfeit of restraint as merely, say, 'sententia communis' might, upon closer investigation in light of the criteria set out in Ad tuendam and its progeny, be found to enjoy infallible certitude, after all, as either primary or, as I think the liceity of the capital punishment qualifies, as secondary objects of infallibility."

== See also ==
- Dogma in the Catholic Church
- Theological censure
- Faith and rationality
- Theologoumenon
- Dogmatic fact
