= Humanum genus =

1884 papal encyclical condemning Freemasonry

Humanum genus Encyclical of Pope Leo XIII
- Signature date: 20 April 1884
- Subject: On Freemasonry
- Number: 14 of 85 of the pontificate
- Text: In English

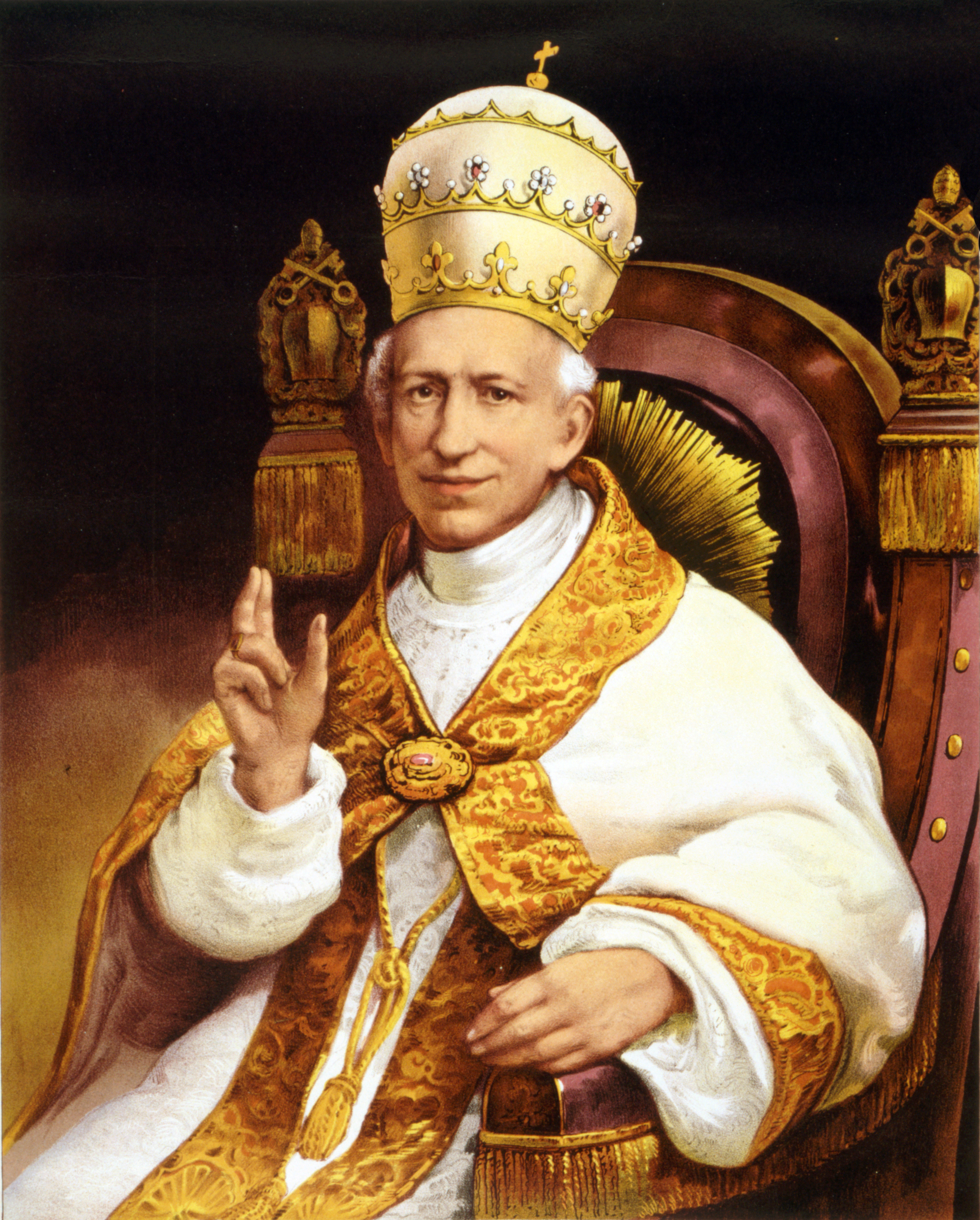
HG 31: "As Our predecessors have many times repeated, let no man think that he may for any reason whatsoever join the Masonic sect, if he values his Catholic name and his eternal salvation as he ought to value them."

Humanum genus is a papal encyclical promulgated on 20 April 1884 by Pope Leo XIII.

Released in the ascent of the industrial age, Marxism, and the aftermath of the September 20, 1870, Capture of Rome by the Kingdom of Italy military forces from the Papal States, Humanum genus is principally a condemnation of Freemasonry. It states that the late 19th century was a dangerous era for the Roman Catholic Church, largely due to numerous concepts and practices it attributes to Freemasonry, namely naturalism, popular sovereignty, and the separation of church and state.

Some of the strictures found in Humanum genus still remain in force today.

== Historical circumstances ==
Following the French withdrawal of its military garrison in Rome in the anticipation of the Franco-Prussian War, the 1870 Capture of Rome itself was a major battle within the long process of Italian unification known as the Risorgimento, marking the final military defeat of the Papal States under Pope Pius IX by the Kingdom of Italy.

This unification of the Italian peninsula by King Victor Emmanuel II of the House of Savoy ended the approximate 1,116 year temporal reign (AD 754 to 1870) of the Papal States by the papacy.

Humanum genus asserted that the late 19th century was a time of particular danger for Roman Catholics as the "partisans of evil" were now far less secretive, as evidenced by the new openness of Freemasonry. Freemasonry had been condemned by previous popes as being contrary to Catholic doctrine, but according to Humanum genus, the nature of Freemasonry was changing as Freemasons were far more open in society with their practices and affiliations.

Humanum genus specifically condemned certain practices of the Freemasons, including: religious indifference; the promotion of public education that denied the Church's role and where "the education of youth shall be exclusively in the hands of laymen"; the approval of the notion that the people are the only source of sovereignty, and that those who rule have no authority but by the commission and concession of the people.

The Holy See has forbidden Roman Catholics from becoming Freemasons since 1738 with the issuing of the Pope Clement XII's bull In eminenti apostolatus. According to the 1983 Declaration on Masonic Associations, "the Church’s negative judgment in regard to Masonic association remains unchanged".

== Background ==
Several popes before Leo XIII had addressed the problems that they associated with Freemasonry and said that the principles of that secret society were incompatible with the teachings of the Church. Previous papal pronouncements on Freemasonry include:

- Pope Clement XII – In eminenti apostolatus, a papal bull in 1738
- Pope Benedict XIV – Providas Romanorum, an Apostolic constitution in 1751
- Pope Pius VII – Ecclesiam a Jesu Christo, an Apostolic constitution in 1821
- Pope Leo XII – Quo graviora (1826), an Apostolic constitution
- Pope Pius VIII – Traditi humilitati, an encyclical in 1829
- Pope Gregory XVI – Mirari vos, an encyclical in 1832
- Pope Pius IX – Qui pluribus, an encyclical in 1846

Leo XIII's denunciation of Freemasonry in Humanum genus can be seen as a call for Roman Catholics to oppose it, especially in the context of his examination of socialism (Quod apostolici muneris), his defence of Christian marriage (Arcanum), and his ideas about the role of government (Diuturnum). Because of the secrecy in Freemasonry, it was believed by the Holy See to have enormous disciplinary control over its members, which Leo viewed as enslavement. By this definition, although individual Masons may be decent people, those same individuals would be led to commit evil acts through their participation in Freemasonry.

== Two kingdoms, two cities ==
Humanum genus leads with the presentation of the Augustinian dichotomy of the two cities, the City of Man and the City of God. The human race is presented as "separated into two diverse and opposite parts, of which the one steadfastly contends for truth and virtue, the other of those things which are contrary to virtue and to truth. The one is the kingdom of God on earth, namely, the true Church of Jesus Christ... The other is the kingdom of Satan," which was "led on or assisted" by Freemasonry:

At every period of time each has been in conflict with the other, with a variety and multiplicity of weapons and of warfare, although not always with equal ardour and assault. At this period, however, the partisans of evil seems to be combining together, and to be struggling with united vehemence, led on or assisted by that strongly organized and widespread association called the Freemasons. No longer making any secret of their purposes, they are now boldly rising up against God Himself. They are planning the destruction of [the] holy Church publicly and openly, and this with the set purpose of utterly despoiling the nations of Christendom, if it were possible, of the blessings obtained for us through Jesus Christ our Saviour. Lamenting these evils, We are constrained by the charity which urges Our heart to cry out often to God: "For lo, Thy enemies have made a noise; and they that hate Thee have lifted up the head. They have taken a malicious counsel against Thy people, and they have consulted against Thy saints. They have said, 'come, and let us destroy them, so that they be not a nation.'

Humanum genus depicted the fundamental doctrine of Freemasonry as naturalism, asserting that this leads to deism and Gnosticism. This was seen as driving Freemasons headlong toward a fundamental clash with the teachings of the Church, especially in light of Freemasons' support of separation of church and state by their efforts to enact and enforce civil constitutional obstacles to the establishment of state churches.

It contrasted the idea of Original sin in Catholic teaching with the hypothesized approach of Freemasonry and naturalist liberals:

...human nature was stained by original sin, and is therefore more disposed to vice than to virtue. For a virtuous life it is absolutely necessary to restrain the disorderly movements of the soul, and to make the passions obedient to reason. In this conflict human things must very often be despised, and the greatest labors and hardships must be undergone, in order that reason may always hold its sway. But the naturalists and Freemasons, having no faith in those things which we have learned by the revelation of God, deny that our first parents sinned, and consequently think that free will is not at all weakened and inclined to evil. On the contrary, exaggerating rather the power and the excellence of nature, and placing therein alone the principle and rule of justice, they cannot even imagine that there is any need at all of a constant struggle and a perfect steadfastness to overcome the violence and rule of our passions.

== Freemasonry condemned ==
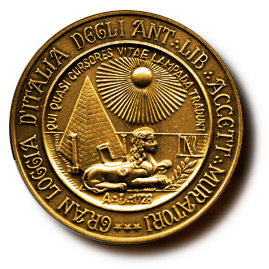
Seal of the Grand Lodge of Italy.

Humanum genus criticizes a number of other Masonic principles; for example, the idea that popular sovereignty is the source of all rights and that man should bend to no authority other than himself:

Then come their doctrines of politics, in which the naturalists lay down that all men have the same right, and are in every respect of equal and like condition; that each one is naturally free; that no one has the right to command another; that it is an act of violence to require men to obey any authority other than that which is obtained from themselves.

Canon 2335 of the Code of Canon Law (1917) declares that "Those who join a Masonic sect or other societies of the same sort, which plot against the Church or against legitimate civil authority, incur ipso facto an excommunication simply reserved to the Holy See."

The Code of Canon Law was updated in 1983, removing the earlier explicit condemnation and excommunication with the current Canon 1374, which states: "A person who joins an association which plots against the Church is to be punished with a just penalty; one who promotes or takes office in such an association is to be punished with an interdict."

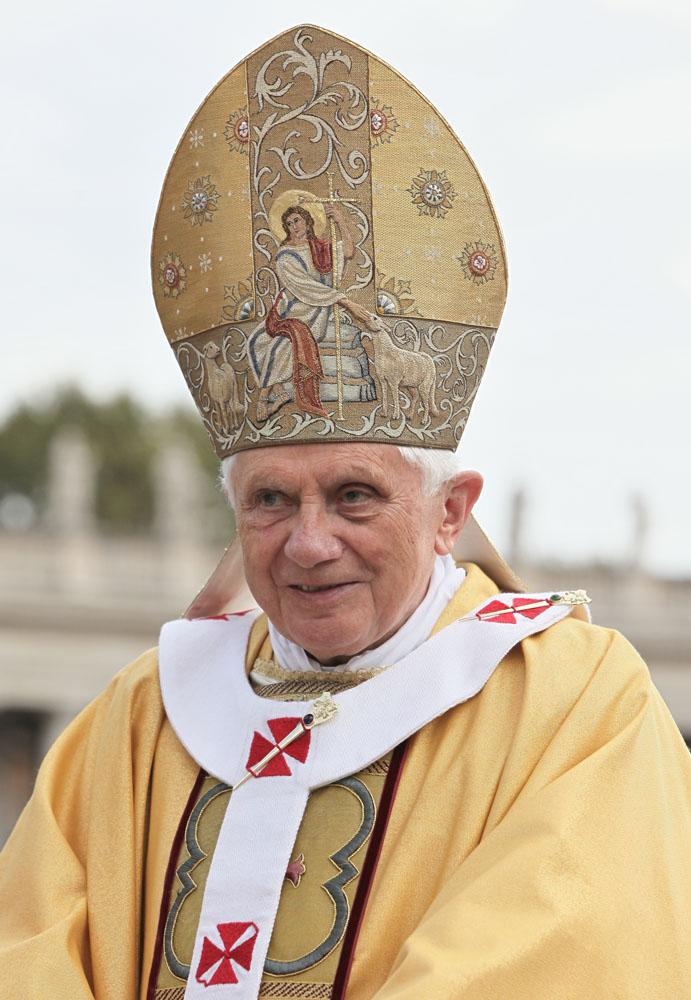
Benedict XVI. (October 17, 2010.)

Cardinal Joseph Ratzinger, the Prefect of the Congregation for the Doctrine of the Faith under Pope John Paul II and himself elected as Pope Benedict XVI on 19 April 2005, issued the 26 November 1983 Declaration on Masonic Associations, which in part states:

"Therefore the Church's negative judgment in regard to Masonic association remains unchanged since their principles have always been considered irreconcilable with the doctrine of the Church and therefore membership in them remains forbidden. The faithful who enroll in Masonic associations are in a state of grave sin and may not receive Holy Communion...In an audience granted to the undersigned Cardinal Prefect, the Supreme Pontiff John Paul II approved and ordered the publication of this Declaration which had been decided in an ordinary meeting of this Sacred Congregation."

Finally, Humanum genus condemns what it presents as the Masonic idea of the separation of religion and state:

It is held also that the State should be without God; that in the various forms of religion there is no reason why one should have precedence of another; and that they are all to occupy the same place.

== See also ==
- Ancien Régime - The Church (France)
- Anti-Masonry
- Catholicism and Freemasonry
- Christianity and Freemasonry
- Civil Constitution of the Clergy (France)
- Continental Freemasonry
- Dechristianization of France during the French Revolution
- Declaration Concerning Status of Catholics Becoming Freemasons
- Declaration of the Rights of Man and of the Citizen (France)
- Declaration on Masonic Associations
- Establishment Clause (US Constitution)
- Etsi Nos (1882)
- First Amendment to the United States Constitution
- Grand Orient de France
- Kulturkampf
- Laïcité
- Lateran Treaty
- Letter to U.S. Bishops Concerning Masonry
- Liberté, égalité, fraternité
- List of encyclicals of Pope Leo XIII
- Papal ban of Freemasonry
- Papal Documents relating to Freemasonry
- Prisoner in the Vatican
- Rerum novarum
- Secularism
- Secular humanism
- Secular state
- Taxil hoax
- War of Anti-Christ with the Church and Christian Civilization
