= Anti-clericalism and Freemasonry =

The question of whether Freemasonry is anticlerical is the subject of debate. The Catholic Church has long been an outspoken critic of Freemasonry, and some scholars have often accused the fraternity of anticlericalism. The Catholic Church forbids its members to join any Masonic society under pain of interdiction. Freemasons usually take a diametrically opposite view, stating that there is nothing in Freemasonry that is in any way contrary to Catholicism or any other religious faith.

Whether Freemasonry is anticlerical often depends on how anticlericalism is defined and which branches of Freemasonry are being referred to. Continental Freemasonry historically had more much anticlerical beliefs than other forms of Freemasonry.

== Anglo-American Freemasonry v. continental Freemasonry ==
Starting in the late eighteenth century, and rapidly expanding in the nineteenth, Freemasonry became polarized over the issue of whether the discussion of religion and politics was appropriate in lodges. Those Grand Lodges that adhered to the Anglo-American form of Freemasonry maintained a strict rule that such discussion was banned. Historian John Robinson notes this fact in reaching the conclusion that Freemasonry is not anticlerical.

The fact that the Continental branch of Freemasonry was concentrated in traditionally Catholic countries may account for the fact that the fraternity has been seen by Catholic critics as an outlet for anti-Catholic disaffection. Many particularly anti-clerical regimes in traditionally Catholic countries were seen as having a strong Masonic element.

== Extent of the anticlericalism ==
According to historians Christopher Clark and Wolfram Kaiser, Freemasonry was not anticlerical from the outset. They state that this changed in the 19th century (in part because of measures by the Catholic Church) and that Freemasonry (mostly continental Freemasonry), developed an anticlerical outlook. They note, however, that the influence of freemasonry should not be given too much weight; even in Italy it was eclipsed in influence by non-Masonic groups such as the Carbonari. They also note that lodges did not hold one consistent political line, many being completely apolitical.

Meanwhile, historians such as Pere Sánchez have described Freemasonry as anti-clerical. "At one level, Freemasonry had spiritually disavowed Catholicism, seeming to be a surrogate religion, without dogmas, which would replace Catholicism. If that were not enough to ensure enmity, it called for concordats, secular education, public cemeteries, abolition of regular clergy and Jesuits, political liberty, etc. For Freemasonry anticlericalism became one of the basic pillars of its engagement in politics and society."

=== Spain ===
The historian Stanley G. Payne believed that the influence of Freemasonry has often been overstated noting that Spanish Catholics had been accused of suffering from a "Masonic psychosis" and notes that, numbering near 65,000 in 1890, “they sometimes figured prominently in Spanish liberalism and republicanism, but their direct collective influence on both politics and anticlericalism has doubtless been considerably exaggerated".

Francisco Franco believed that Freemasonry had contributed to the anti-clerical violence that preceded the Spanish Civil War. He stated in an interview with a Spanish journalist that; "In my opinion, Freemasonry, with all its international influence, is the organization principally responsible for the political ruin of Spain..."

=== Portugal ===
According to historian Stanley G. Payne, members of the Masonic lodges played a major role in the rise of Portuguese liberalism and anticlericalism. However, he notes that the fraternity was not always united in opinion. Masons were found on both sides of the Gomes da Freire revolt in 1817. In 1820, however, Masons were devoted almost unanimously to the liberal cause in politics, and in the 1830s they had become the principal promoters of anticlericalism. After the triumph of constitutionalism, however, Portuguese Freemasonry split into more radical and more conservative groups, and by the 1860s it had ceased to play a catalytic role in politics. The upper middle class, established in power and wealth, were less attracted to it, and by the late nineteenth century Masons were drawn mainly from the lower middle class ranks of white-collar employees. Its place in radical politics at the turn of the century was taken over largely by secret republican radical political societies, especially the non-masonic Carbonária, and by 1912 the Masons had fewer than 3,000 members.

=== Germany ===
The Papal encyclical Etsi multa of Pope Pius IX in 1873 claimed that Freemasonry was the motivating force behind the Kulturkampf: "Some of you may perchance wonder that the war against the Catholic Church extends so widely. Indeed each of you knows well the nature, zeal, and intention of sects, whether called Masonic or some other name. When he compares them with the nature, purpose, and amplitude of the conflict waged nearly everywhere against the Church, he cannot doubt but that the present calamity must be attributed to their deceits and machinations for the most part. For from these the synagogue of Satan is formed which draws up its forces, advances its standards, and joins battle against the Church of Christ." The 1967 Catholic Encyclopedia also claims that the Kulturkampf was instigated by Masonic lodges.

=== Belgium ===
The rivalry between the Catholic Church and the Grand Orient of Belgium led to the foundation of the Free University of Brussels which was founded largely by Belgian Freemasons concerned at the expansion of Catholic influence within Higher Education.

=== Italy ===
In the Papal constitution Ecclesiam a Jesu Christo (1821) Pope Pius VII linked the anticlerical Italian secret society, the Carbonari to Freemasonry.

In the period between Italian unification (1870) and the Lateran Treaties (1929) there was a cold war between the Papacy and the Kingdom of Italy (see Prisoner in the Vatican). The Papal Encyclical Etsi Nos, complained about the way in which post-unification Italy denigrated the role of the church, which the Vatican blamed primarily on Freemasonry.

Benito Mussolini decreed in 1924 that every member of his Fascist Party who was a Mason must abandon either one or the other organization, and in 1925, he dissolved Freemasonry in Italy, claiming that it was a political organisation with anti-religious influence. One of the most prominent Fascists, General Cappello, who had also been Deputy Grand Master of the Grande Oriente, Italy's leading Grand Lodge, gave up his membership in the Fascist Party rather than in Masonry. He was later arrested on false charges and sentenced to 30 years in jail.

The hostility to Freemasonry shaped much of the Catholic Church's strategy in regard to the newly established Italian state. For example, in the encyclical Custodi di quella fede Leo XIII warned against Catholics becoming involved with liberal groups and asked Catholics to become more involved in forms of Catholic Action away from the "Masonic" state.

Ironically the only time in modern times a Masonic lodge engaged in proto government activities was Propaganda Due a Masonic lodge founded in 1877, within the tradition of Continental Freemasonry and under the authority of Grand Orient of Italy. Its Masonic charter was withdrawn in 1976, and it was transformed by Worshipful Master Licio Gelli into an international, illegal, clandestine, anti-communist, anti-Soviet, anti-Marxist, and radical right criminal organization and secret society operating in contravention of Article 18 of the Constitution of Italy that banned all such secret associations. Licio Gelli continued to operate the unaffiliated lodge from 1976 to 1984. P2 was implicated in numerous Italian crimes and mysteries, including the collapse of the Holy See-affiliated Banco Ambrosiano, the contract killings of journalist Carmine Pecorelli and mobbed-up bank president Roberto Calvi, and political corruption cases within the nationwide Tangentopoli bribery scandal. P2 came to light through the investigations into the collapse of Michele Sindona's financial empire.

In 2007 Italian politicians in the Union of Christian and Centre Democrats and Forza Italia accused “radical and Masonic” groups of being behind a threatened investigation by the European Commission of whether or not the tax-exempt status of the Church's hospitals, schools, and other social service organizations should be withdrawn.

=== Mexico ===
The Mexican Revolution was seen by Cardinal William Henry O'Connell in 1914 as part of a "Masonic conspiracy" in conjunction with the North American Protestants. O'Connell and the American Federation of Catholic Societies urged U.S. president Woodrow Wilson to not recognize the Mexican government, as the Catholic clergy were increasingly stigmatized as collective enemies of the Revolution.

President Plutarco Elías Calles sought to vigorously enforce the secularising provisions of the constitution and enacted additional anti-Catholic legislation known as the Calles Law, which enacted a number of anti-clerical provisions, for example fining priests for wearing clerical dress. Many Catholics rebelled in the conflict known as the Cristero War. On May 28, 1926, Calles was awarded a medal of merit from the head of Mexico's Scottish rite for his actions against the Catholics.

In August 2007 Pedro Marquez of the Grand Lodge of the Valley of Mexico, in discussing a call by the Church to lift the ban in the Mexican constitution against Catholic schools and newspapers, stated "The Catholic hierarchy wants to dictate a political policy and that is a very grave error, as our society is no longer in the era of Christianity and priests are no longer viceroys of New Spain," and that "There is a tendency in the Church to meddle in the social and political affairs of Mexico, but the priests should return to their Churches".

=== Ecuador ===
Some attributed to Freemasonry the assassination of Gabriel García Moreno who twice served as President of Ecuador (1859-1865 and 1869–1875) and was assassinated during his second term, just days before he was to take office for his third term. He is noted for his conservatism and Catholic religious perspective.

Part of the animosity García Moreno generated was because of his friendship toward the Society of Jesus, and during a period of their exile, he helped a group of displaced Jesuits find refuge in Ecuador. He had also advocated legislation which would outlaw secret societies. This action and many similar ones encouraged the anti-Catholic parties of Ecuador, especially the Masons, to see in him an inveterate enemy. The 1869 constitution made Catholicism the established religion of the state. He was the only ruler in the world to protest the Pope's loss of the Papal States, and two years later had the legislature consecrate Ecuador to the Sacred Heart. One of his biographers writes that after the public consecration, he was condemned to die by German Freemasonry.

When he was elected a third time in 1875, he and many of his supporters considered it to be a death warrant. He wrote immediately to Pope Pius IX asking for his blessing before inauguration day on August 30:

I wish to obtain your blessing before that day, so that I may have the strength and light which I need so much in order to be unto the end a faithful son of our Redeemer, and a loyal and obedient servant of His Infallible Vicar. Now that the Masonic Lodges of the neighboring countries, instigated by Germany, are vomiting against me all sorts of atrocious insults and horrible calumnies, now that the Lodges are secretly arranging for my assassination, I have more need than ever of the divine protection so that I may live and die in defense of our holy religion and the beloved republic which I am called once more to rule.

García Moreno's prediction was correct; he was assassinated exiting the Cathedral in Quito, struck down with knives and revolvers, his last words being: "¡Dios no muere!" ("God does not die!")

On August 5, shortly before his assassination, a priest visited García Moreno and warned him, "You have been warned that your death was decreed by the Freemasons; but you have not been told when. I have just heard that the assassins are going to try and carry out their plot at once. For God's sake, take your measures accordingly!" García Moreno replied that he had already received similar warnings and after calm reflection concluded that the only measure he could take was to prepare himself to appear before God.

A contemporary review of public events observed that "It appears he was assassinated by members of a secret society".

== See also ==
- War of Anti-Christ with the Church and Christian Civilization
- Anti-Masonry
- Christianity and Freemasonry
- Declaration Concerning Status of Catholics Becoming Freemasons
- Letter to U.S. Bishops Concerning Masonry (1985)
- Papal documents relating to Freemasonry
- Papal ban of Freemasonry
