= Quibus quantisque malis =

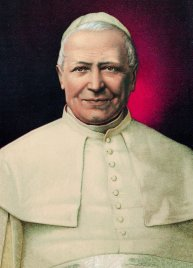
Pius IX

Quibus quantisque malis is a lengthy (Note: It is 7350 words in length.) papal allocution delivered by Pope Pius IX to the Consistory of Cardinals, assembled in Gaeta, south of Rome, on 20 April 1849, discussing the recent political atmosphere.

== Background ==
Pius IX was elected Pope in June 1846, during a time of political agitation which ultimately led to the brief Roman Republic of 1849. One of his first acts was to declare an amnesty for all the political prisoners held in the papal jails. He fled from Rome to Gaeta on 25 November 1848.

== Contents ==
In Quibus quantusque, Pius gives a retrospective analysis of his first three years as Pope. He discusses some of the most important events, his intentions and the maneuverings of certain revolutionary elements who had worked to capitalize on them. Revolutionaries in Rome had exploited Pius IX's amnesty concessions, and continuously stirred up the populace to exert pressure in order to obtain additional ones.

And it escapes no one that many who had been generously given that pardon not only did not change their thoughts at all, as We were hoping, but instead, as they persisted each day more bitterly in their designs and machinations, there was nothing that they left undone, nothing that they did not dare, nothing that they did not try, to shake and overthrow the civil Principate of the Roman Pontiff and his government, as they had already been planning for a long time, and at the same time, they brought a most bitter war against Our Most Holy Religion.

== Significance ==
While the discourse does not specifically mention Freemasonry, Hermann Gruber, writing in the historical Catholic Encyclopedia, lists it among the papal pronouncements against Freemasonry, and it is mentioned by masonic sources as equating Freemasonry with socialism and communism. Pius refers to what he calls "the abominable sects of perdition", recalling and repeating the proscription of such societies which he had declared in Qui pluribus on 9 November 1846.

== See also ==
- Papal Documents relating to Freemasonry
- Christianity and Freemasonry
- Catholicism and Freemasonry
- Declaration Concerning Status of Catholics Becoming Freemasons
