= Quo graviora (1825) =

Catholic Church law banning membership in Masonic lodges, issued by Pope Leo XIII

Quo graviora mala Latin for 'The graver the evils' Papal bull of Pope Leo XII
- Signature date: 13 March 1825
- Subject: Condemnation of Freemasonry
- Text: In Latin; In English

Quo graviora, or Quo graviora mala, was an apostolic constitution promulgated by Pope Leo XII on 13 March 1825, in which he decreed the prohibition of membership in Masonic lodges in perpetuity.

Leo quoted Pope Clement XII's papal bull In eminenti (1738), Pope Benedict XIV's bull Providas Romanorum (1751) and Pope Pius VII's bull Ecclesiam a Jesu Christo (1821) in full, and briefly also from Pope Clement XIII's encyclical letter A quo die (1758). Following his quotations in full of the declarations of his predecessors, he states that "immediately" after his election to the papacy, he set about "exposing what the state of clandestine sects was, what their number was, what their power was". In his assessment, the "arrogance" of the secret societies "had grown principally on account of the multitude of them, increased by [birth] the new sects".

In particular, secret societies formed within universities were a particular problem. These he referred to as "Universitaria" because their "seat and domicile in many universities of learning" gave them particular influence over generations of young people.

Pope Gregory XVI refers to Leo's constitution in an apostolic letter of his own, Ad Gravissimas (1843).

== See also ==
- Anti-Masonry
- Declaration concerning status of Catholics becoming Freemasons
- Papal ban of Freemasonry
- Papal documents relating to Freemasonry
