= Custodi di quella fede =

Papal encyclical by Pope Leo XIII

Custodi di quella fede Encyclical of Pope Leo XIII
- Signature date: 8 December 1892
- Subject: On Freemasonry
- Number: 45 of 85 of the pontificate
- Text: In English

Custodi di quella fede was a papal encyclical promulgated by Leo XIII in 1892 addressed to the Italian people.

It accompanied the encyclical Inimica vis that was addressed to the Italian bishops. It asked Catholics to work against Freemasonry by guarding families against infiltration, and establishing Catholic institutions such as schools, mutual aid societies and newspapers. It generally urged Catholics to shun secular and non-religious societies.

== See also ==
- Anticlericalism and Freemasonry
- Anti-Masonry
- Catholicism and Freemasonry
- Christianity and Freemasonry
- Declaration Concerning Status of Catholics Becoming Freemasons
- List of encyclicals of Pope Leo XIII
- Papal Documents relating to Freemasonry
