= Annum ingressi =

Annum Ingressi was an apostolic epistle written by Leo XIII in 1902. It was addressed to the bishops of the world reviewing the twenty five years of his pontificate. It also urged resistance to Freemasonry.

== See also ==
- Papal Documents relating to Freemasonry
- Anti-Masonry
- Christianity and Freemasonry
- Catholicism and Freemasonry
- Declaration Concerning Status of Catholics Becoming Freemasons
