= Officio sanctissimo =

Papal encyclical by Pope Leo XIII

Officio sanctissimo Latin for 'The Holiest Office (or Duty)' Encyclical of Pope Leo XIII
- Signature date: 22 December 1887
- Subject: On the Church in Bavaria
- Number: 23 of 85 of the pontificate
- Text: In English

Officio sanctissimo, subtitled "On The Church in Bavaria", was a papal encyclical published by Pope Leo XIII in 1887. It recalled the continuous history of Catholicism in Bavaria; and praised the people's resistance to the Kulturkampf. It also condemned Freemasonry, calling it a "sect of darkness."

== See also ==
- Papal Documents relating to Freemasonry
- Anti-Masonry
- Christianity and Freemasonry
- Catholicism and Freemasonry
- Declaration Concerning Status of Catholics Becoming Freemasons
- List of encyclicals of Pope Leo XIII
