= Inimica vis =

Papal encyclical by Pope Leo XIII

Inimica vis Encyclical of Pope Leo XIII
- Signature date: 8 December 1892
- Subject: On Freemasonry
- Number: 45 of 85 of the pontificate
- Text: In English

Inimica vis is a papal encyclical addressed to the Catholic bishops of Italy. It remarked on the multiple condemnations of Freemasonry over the preceding century and a half and concentrated on the local difficulties of the Italian church. It was promulgated by Leo XIII in 1892.

It is viewed as reproving the Italian bishops for an apathetic response to Freemasonry in Italy and it complained that some members of the Catholic clergy were co-operating with the Masonic and anti-clerical government of the Kingdom of Italy. It was seen as the start of Papal "bargaining" with the forces symbolised by Continental Freemasonry, although it has also been noted that Freemasonry was denounced as a "vile sect".

On the same date Inimica vis was promulgated, 18 December 1892, Pope Leo XIII wrote Custodi di quella fede, an encyclical epistle addressed to the Italian people, further attacking Freemasonry.

== See also ==
- Anti-Masonry
- Catholicism and Freemasonry
- Christianity and Freemasonry
- Declaration Concerning Status of Catholics Becoming Freemasons
- List of encyclicals of Pope Leo XIII
- Papal Documents relating to Freemasonry
