= Dall'alto dell'Apostolico Seggio =

Papal encyclical by Pope Leo XIII

Dall'alto dell'Apostolico Seggio Italian for 'From the height of the Apostolic Throne' Encyclical of Pope Leo XIII
- Signature date: 15 October 1890
- Subject: On Freemasonry in Italy
- Number: 34 of 85 of the pontificate
- Text: In English

Pope Leo XIII's papal encyclical on the subject of Freemasonry in Italy, known both by its Italian incipit Dall'alto dell'Apostolico Seggio and its Latin incipit Ab apostolici Solii celsitudine, was a promulgated on 15 October 1890.

It dealt with Freemasonry in Italy, condemning the contemporary course of public affairs in Italy as the realization of the "Masonic programme". This "programme" was said to involve a "deadly hatred of the Church", the abolition of religious instruction in schools and the absolute independence of civil society from clerical influence.

== See also ==
- Anti-Masonry
- Catholicism and Freemasonry
- Christianity and Freemasonry
- Declaration concerning status of Catholics becoming Freemasons
- List of encyclicals of Pope Leo XIII
- Papal documents relating to Freemasonry
