= Praeclara gratulationis publicae =

Apostolic letter by Pope Leo XIII

Praeclara gratulationis publicae Apostolic letter of Pope Leo XIII
- Signature date: 20 June 1894
- Subject: The Reunion of Christendom
- Number: 50 of 85 of the pontificate
- Text: In Latin; In English

Praeclara gratulationis publicae (Splendid testimonies of public [rejoicing]) is an apostolic letter of Pope Leo XIII promulgated on 20 June 1894.

== Content ==
It called for the reunion of Eastern and Western churches into the "Unity of the Faith". It also condemned Freemasonry. A previous letter on the same subject, entitled In Suprema Petri Apostoli Sede, had been written by Pope Pius IX in 1848.

== Reactions and legacy ==
In 1895, it was criticized by Ecumenical Patriarch Anthimus VII.

The call for unity was re-asserted by the Second Vatican Council's Unitatis redintegratio, although the latter statement articulates a different kind of ecclesiology that is more in line with the Council's spirit of cooperation with fellow Christians.

Praeclara was cited in the encyclical Orientales omnes Ecclesias of Pope Pius XII on the topic of Eastern Catholic Churches.

Leo XIII has also been criticized by Protestant fundamentalists for having declared in the encyclical that "We hold upon this earth the place of God Almighty", which was seen as a sign of the coming apocalypse.

== See also ==
- In Suprema Petri Apostoli Sede
- Papal ban of Freemasonry
- East–West Schism
- List of encyclicals of Pope Leo XIII
- Papal documents relating to Freemasonry
