= ETSI (disambiguation) =

ETSI may refer to:

- European Telecommunications Standards Institute
- ICAO code of Ingolstadt Manching Airport

== See also ==
- Etsi multa, Etsi Nos, and Etsi de statu, various papal encyclicals or papal bulls
- ETS1
