= Qui pluribus =

Encyclical promulgated by Pope Pius IX on 9 November 1846

Qui pluribus Encyclical of Pope Pius IX
- Signature date: 9 November 1846
- Subject: Condemnation of rationalism and fideism
- Number: 1 of the pontificate, 41 of the total
- Text: In original language

Qui pluribus (Latin: For many years past, subtitled "On Faith and Religion") is an encyclical promulgated by Pope Pius IX on 9 November 1846. It was the first encyclical of his reign and written to urge the prelates to be on their guard against the dangers posed by rationalism, pantheism, socialism, communism and other popular philosophies. It was a commentary on the widespread civil unrest spreading across Italy, as nationalists with a variety of beliefs and methods sought the unification of Italy.

== Context ==
Pius IX was elected to the papacy in June 1846. The following November, he addressed this encyclical to "All Patriarchs, Primates, Archbishops, and Bishops", exhorting them to be vigilant against the dangers of rationalism, pantheism, communism, and modernity. "Therefore, since We have now assumed the supreme pontificate..., We are sending this letter to you without delay, in accordance with the established practice of Our predecessors. Its purpose is to urge that you keep the night-watches over the flock entrusted to your care with the greatest possible eagerness, wakefulness and effort..."

Italian nationalism exploded in the post-Napoleonic years, leading to the establishment of secret societies bent on a unified Italy. After 1815, Freemasonry in Italy was repressed and discredited due to its French connections. A void was left that the Carbonari filled with a movement that closely resembled Freemasonry but with a commitment to Italian nationalism and no association with Napoleon and his government. The Carbonari was a secret society divided into small covert cells scattered across Italy. They were strongly anti-clerical in both their philosophy and programme. The Carbonari movement spread across Italy. A well-known member of the Carbonari was Giuseppe Mazzini who, in 1831, founded yet another secret society, Young Italy, whose members plotted revolts in revolt in Savoy and elsewhere. Another prominent member was Giuseppe Garibaldi, who in 1834 joined Mazzini in a failed insurrection in Piedmont. Garibaldi joined Freemasonry in 1844.

According to Thomas W. O'Brien, much of the document was drafted by Luigi Cardinal Lambruschini, Secretary of State to Pius's predecessor, the staunchly conservative Pope Gregory XVI.

== Contents ==
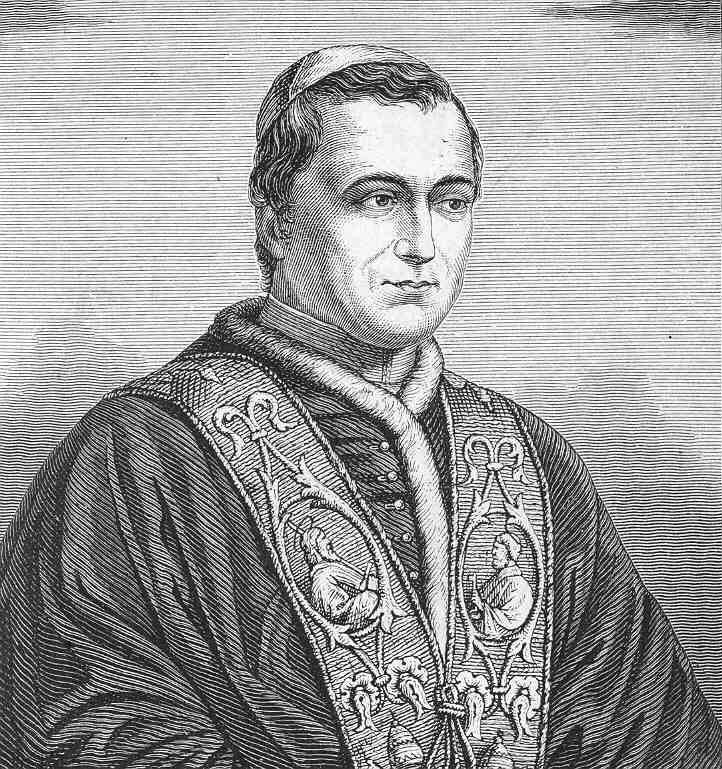
Illustration of Pope Pius IX soon after his election to the papacy in 1846

At the start of his letter, Pius observes that "for many years past", he had served as a Catholic bishop before his election as Pope. (Note: Pius was appointed Archbishop of Spoleto in 1827 and served as Bishop of Imola from 1832 until 1846.)

=== Enemies of the church ===
The encyclical is particularly directed against "a lawless alliance" of socialists, communists, and others who, through "their outlandish errors and their many harmful methods, plots and contrivances ... which they use to set in motion their plans to quench peoples' zeal for piety, justice and virtue, to corrupt morals, to cast all divine and human laws into confusion, and to weaken and even possibly overthrow the Catholic religion and civil society."

Secret societies

Pius condemned "secret sects who have come forth from the darkness to destroy and desolate both the sacred and the civil commonwealth". While not specifically mentioning Freemasonry, Hermann Gruber, writing in the Catholic Encyclopedia, lists Qui pluribus among the papal pronouncements against Freemasonry.

Bible Societies

In 1844, Pope Gregory XVI had issued an encyclical, Inter praecipuas machinationes, directed against the anti-Catholic propaganda in Italy of the London Bible Society and the New York Christian Alliance, which endeavoured with some success, to spread anti-clericalism among the populace. Pius reiterated Gregory's condemnation of

The crafty Bible Societies which renew the old skill of the heretics and ceaselessly force on people of all kinds, even the uneducated, gifts of the Bible. They issue these in large numbers and at great cost, in vernacular translations... The commentaries which are included often contain perverse explanations; so, having rejected divine tradition, the doctrine of the Fathers and the authority of the Catholic Church, they all interpret the words of the Lord by their own private judgment, thereby perverting their meaning."

Communism

Qui pluribus contains the first mention of communism in any papal encyclical. (Note: The encyclical was published two years before Marx and Engels' The Communist Manifesto.) Pius described communism as "...a doctrine most opposed to the very natural law. For if this doctrine were accepted, the complete destruction of everyone's laws, government, property, and even of human society itself would follow."

=== Responses ===
As a partial remedy, Pius then dealt at length, and without apology, on the education and training of the clergy, "However, priests are the best examples of piety and God's worship, and people tend generally to be of the same quality as their priests. When ministers are ignorant or neglectful of their duty, then the morals of the people also immediately decline." He directed the bishops to choose carefully those candidates to be admitted to the seminary. "You must examine with greater diligence the morals and the knowledge of men who are entrusted with the care and guidance of souls, that they may be eager to continuously feed and assist the people entrusted to them by the administration of the sacraments, the preaching of God’s word and the example of good works...Consecrate with holy orders and promote to the performance of the sacred mysteries only those who have been carefully examined and who are virtuous and wise."

== See also ==
- List of encyclicals of Pope Pius IX
- Papal Documents relating to Freemasonry
- Anticlericalism and Freemasonry
- Catholicism and Freemasonry
- Declaration Concerning Status of Catholics Becoming Freemasons
