= Ecclesiam a Jesu Christo =

Ecclesiam a Jesu Christo Latin for 'The Church established by Jesus Christ' Papal bull of Pope Pius VII
- Signature date: 13 September 1821
- Subject: Condemnation of Carbonarism
- Text: In Latin

Ecclesiam a Jesu Christo was a papal bull concerned with secret societies opposed to the Catholic Church, primarily the Carbonari. It was promulgated by Pius VII on 13 September 1821. Its opening words refer to "the church [founded] by Jesus Christ".

It stated that Freemasons must be excommunicated on account of the oath-bound secrecy of the society and its conspiracies against church and state.

== Contents ==
Pius VII linked the Carbonari, an anti-clerical revolutionary group active in Italy, with Freemasonry, which other Popes before him had condemned. Pius rejected the argument that the pronouncements of Popes Clement XII (In eminenti apostolatus, 1738) and Benedict XIV (Providas Romanorum, 1751) did not apply to the Carbonari, but in any case he extended their earlier proscriptions to the Carbonari movement and its literature.

Pius argued that the Carbonari "pretended to show respect and a certain zeal for the Catholic religion". However the true goals of the Carbonari were said to be:

- Religious indifferentism;
- Disestablishment of the church and total religious freedom
- The profanation of Jesus Christ through their ceremonies
- To scorn, and perhaps replace, the sacraments of the church; and
- To plot against Papal primacy

All members of the Carbonari were excommunicated, along with those who kept Carbonari secrets and those promoting Carbonari literature.

== See also ==
- Papal Documents relating to Freemasonry
- Anti-Masonry
- Christianity and Freemasonry
- Catholicism and Freemasonry
- Declaration Concerning Status of Catholics Becoming Freemasons
