= Traditi humilitati =

1829 papal encyclical by Pius VIII

Traditi Humilitati Latin for 'Entrusted with humility' Encyclical of Pope Pius VIII
- Signature date: 24 May 1829
- Subject: Liberalism; Freemasonry; Bible translations Marriage
- Number: 1 of 1 of the pontificate

Traditi humilitati is a papal encyclical issued by Pope Pius VIII in 1829. It laid out the program for his pontificate. Although it does not explicitly mention freemasonry, it has been cited by later Church documents on the subject because it condemned those "who think that the portal of eternal salvation opens for all from any religion".

Regarding religious pluralism, Pius VIII condemned the "foul contrivance of the sophists of this age" that would place Catholicism on a par with any other religion.

Regarding Bible translations and the work of non-Catholic bible societies, he wrote:

We must also be wary of those who publish the Bible with new interpretations contrary to the Church's laws. They skillfully distort the meaning by their own interpretation. They print the Bibles in the vernacular and, absorbing an incredible expense, offer them free even to the uneducated. Furthermore, the Bibles are rarely without perverse little inserts to ensure that the reader imbibes their lethal poison instead of the saving water of salvation.

On marriage, Traditi humilitati fell within a series of papal documents "denying that the civil power can regulate marriage", which can be traced from a letter of Pope Pius VII to the Archbishop of Mainz, Etsi Fraternitatis, sent on 8 October 1803, stating that lay tribunals' and non-Catholic assemblies' declarations of nullity and attempts to dissolve marriages "have no value or effect in the eyes of the Church", through Traditi humilitati, to Gregory XVI's Commissum divinitus (1835), Pius IX's Ad Apostolicae Sedis (1851) and beyond. Pius VIII explained that marriage was "formerly" concerned only with the procreation of children,

"but now it has been raised to the dignity of a sacrament by Christ the Lord and enriched with heavenly gifts. Now its purpose is not so much to generate offspring as to educate children for God and for religion"

and so marriage cannot be regulated by the state: "it signifies the perpetual and sublime union of Christ with His Church; as a result, the close union of husband and wife is a sacrament". In Litteris altero abhinc (1830), Pius also declared that a mixed marriage could only be blessed by a priest if proper promises had been made to educate the children of the marriage as Catholics.

More generally, Pius also felt that the Catholic Church was beset by many "serious dangers", too many to list, which he and the church hierarchy were intent on addressing.

== See also ==
- Anti-Masonry
- Opposition to Freemasonry within Christianity
- Position of the Catholic Church on Freemasonry
