= Romanorum =

Romanorum may refer to:

- The Corpus Agrimensorum Romanorum, a Roman treatise on land surveying.
- Liber Diurnus Romanorum Pontificum, Latin for Journal of the Roman Pontiffs, is the name given to a miscellaneous collection of ecclesiastical formulae used in the Papal chancery until about the 11th century.
- Gesta Romanorum, a Latin collection of anecdotes and tales, was probably compiled about the end of the 13th century or the beginning of the 14th.
- The Imperator Romanorum (disambiguation), or Roman Emperor, ruler of the Roman State during the imperial period.
- Providas Romanorum was an Apostolic constitution promulgated by Pope Benedict XIV on May 18, 1751.
- Rex Romanorum was the title used by the elected ruler of the Holy Roman Empire.
