= Rosario Francesco Esposito =

Italian priest and Freemason

Rosario Francesco Esposito, SSP (25 September 1921 – 23 November 2007) was an Italian Pauline priest known for joining Freemasonry. He dismissed the Church ban on membership in the Masonic lodge, saying that it is “a thing of the past.”

Before he joined the fraternity, Esposito, together with Father Giovanni Caprile, had been commissioned by the Congregation for the Doctrine of the Faith to study the Church's teaching on masonry. In 1983, the prefect of the Congregation, then-Cardinal Joseph Ratzinger, issued a Clarification concerning status of Catholics becoming Freemasons that stated that the Church's ban on Masonic membership remained in place.

On 1 March 2007 Bishop Gianfranco Girotti, the regent of the Apostolic Penitentiary, reacted to Esposito's declaration by making a statement that membership of Masonic organisations "remains forbidden" to Catholics, and called on priests who had declared themselves to be Freemasons to be disciplined by their direct superiors.

== See also ==
- Catholicism and Freemasonry
