= Providas Romanorum =

Papal bull

Providas Romanorum is a papal bull promulgated by Pope Benedict XIV on 18 March 1751, which condemned freemasonry on the grounds of its alleged naturalism, demand for oaths, secrecy, religious indifferentism, and possible threat to the church and state.

In the bull, Benedict confirmed, and quoted in full, Pope Clement XII's constitution on the same subject, In eminenti apostolatus, issued in 1738. It specifically forbids Roman Catholics from seeking membership in any Masonic group.

In turn, Pope Pius VII, in his bull Ecclesiam a Jesu Christo (1821) drew on both of these documents. Pius was concerned with the Carbonari, but wrote that the society of the Carbonari were "perhaps an offshoot, or certainly an imitation" of the freemasons.

== See also ==
- Papal Documents relating to Freemasonry
- Anti-Masonry
- Christianity and Freemasonry
- Catholicism and Freemasonry
- Declaration Concerning Status of Catholics Becoming Freemasons
