= Declaration on Masonic Associations =

The Declaration on Masonic Associations is a declaration by the Congregation for the Doctrine of the Faith re-iterating the prohibition of Catholics from joining Masonic organizations. Its Latin title is Declaratio de associationibus massonicis. The document states that Catholics who join Masonic organizations are in a state of grave sin and may not receive Holy Communion. It was issued in 1983 by the prefect of the congregation, Joseph Cardinal Ratzinger, who became Pope Benedict XVI on April 19, 2005.

== History of canon law regarding Freemasonry ==
Catholic canon law has forbidden membership in Masonic organizations since 1738, with Pope Clement XII's papal bull In eminenti apostolatus. Later popes continued to ban Masonic membership through the eighteenth and nineteenth centuries. When canon law was codified into the 1917 Code of Canon Law, these existing prohibitions were preserved in the code, especially in Can 2335. The 1917 code forbids Catholics, under the penalty of excommunication, to enroll in Masonic or other similar associations.

Can 2335: Affiliation With Masonic or Similar Societies. Those who join a Masonic sect or other societies of the same sort, which plot against the Church or against legitimate civil authority, incur ipso facto an excommunication simply reserved to the Holy See. [p. 924.]

The 1983 Code of Canon Law superseded the 1917 Code. Specific mention of Masonry was omitted from the new code. Membership in organizations that "plot against the Church", however, is prohibited.

Can. 1374. A person who joins an association which plots against the Church is to be punished with a just penalty; one who promotes or takes office in such an association is to be punished with an interdict.

In the 1917 code, Masonry was specifically mentioned, but in the 1983 code it was not. Since the new canon law did not specifically mention Masonry, any issues or questions about Roman Catholics with Masonic associations were clarified by the Sacred Congregation for the Doctrine of the Faith. The CDF issued a decree on November 26, 1983 entitled DECLARATION ON MASONIC ASSOCIATIONS which states as follows, "Therefore the Church’s negative judgment in regard to Masonic association remains unchanged since their principles have always been considered irreconcilable with the doctrine of the Church and therefore membership in them remains forbidden. The faithful who enroll in Masonic associations are in a state of grave sin and may not receive Holy Communion. [...] In an audience granted to the undersigned Cardinal Prefect, the Supreme Pontiff John Paul II approved and ordered the publication of this Declaration which had been decided in an ordinary meeting of this Sacred Congregation."

== Legal status ==
The relevance of the declaration under canon law is unclear. Canon law allows for a process by which provisions of the code are interpreted authoritatively. It has been argued, however, that the declaration cannot be regarded as an authoritative interpretation of canon 2335, prohibiting membership in organizations which plot against the Church, since it does not make reference to it.

=== Letter to US bishops ===
In the Letter to U.S. Bishops Concerning Masonry dated April 19, 1985, Cardinal Bernard Law affirmed Ratzinger's proclamation and reiterated the ban on all forms of freemasonry.

== See also ==
- Papal ban of Freemasonry
- Humanum genus
