= Order of the Pug =

1730s–40s para-Masonic society founded in Bavaria

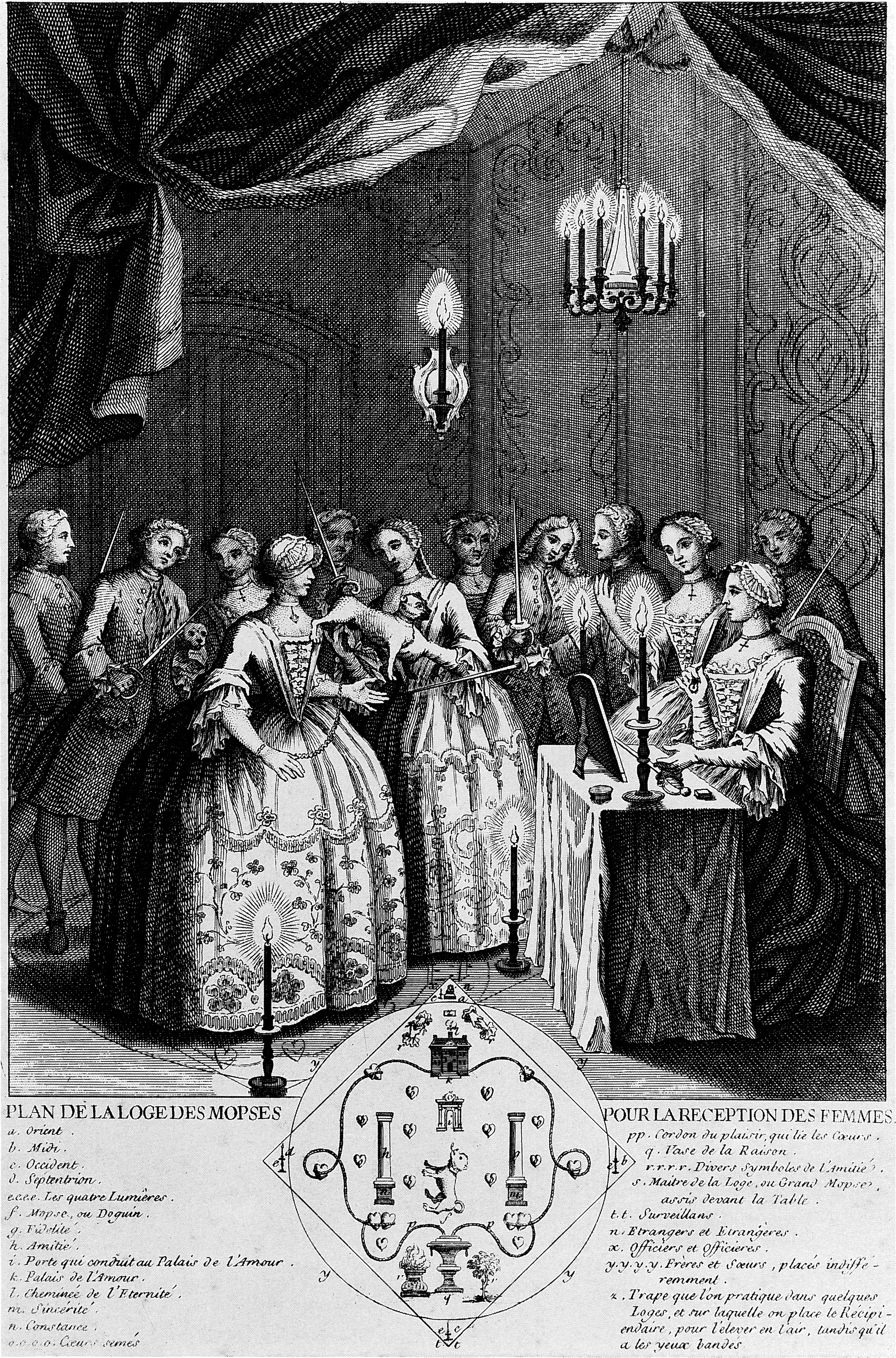
The Order of the Pug

The Order of the Pug (German: Mops-Orden) was a para-Masonic society founded by Roman Catholics. It is believed that it was founded in 1738 by Klemens August of Bavaria to bypass the crown's In eminenti apostolatus of 1738. The constitution of the Order of the Pug allowed women to become members as long as they were Catholic. The pug was chosen as a symbol of loyalty, trustworthiness and steadiness.

== History ==
No reliable information has been handed down about the origins of the pug order. It is believed to have been founded in France around 1740, from whence it spread to the Netherlands and Germany, where a lodge is said to have existed in Bayreuth. The founder is said to have been Klemens August, Duke of Bavaria, in 1740.

Members called themselves Mops (the German for Pug). Each lodge had a female and a male lodge master, who called themselves grand pugs and took turns running the lodge every six months. Other functions, such as secretaries and overseers, were also androgynously filled. However, the lodge grandmaster was always male.

The order was banned by Göttingen University in 1748. Loge Louise des ehrwürdigen Mopsordens or "Lodge Louise of the Venerable Order of the Pug" had been formed the previous year as a student society, mainly drawn from the Hanoverian nobility. The lodge fees and their control over their members formed the excuse for the closure, and after a government investigation, the lodge documents were passed to the university authorities.

While German sources state that the order was short-lived, they were reportedly active in Lyon as late as 1902.

=== Initiation ritual ===
Novices were initiated wearing a dog collar and had to scratch at the door to be admitted inside. The novices were blindfolded and led nine times around a carpet with symbols on it, while the Pugs of the order barked loudly to test the steadiness of the newcomers. During the initiation, the novices also had to kiss a porcelain pug's backside under its tail as an expression of devotion to the order. Subsequently, the hand of the person asking for admittance to the order was placed by the master on a rapier in the case of a man, and on a mirror in the case of a woman, with a vow being demanded. Finally, the initiate was asked to "see the light", whereupon the blindfold was removed. The members of the order would stand around the initiate in a circle, holding out a rapier or a mirror in one hand and a pug in the other. At the end of the Rococo period, the initiate also had to undergo the ceremonial presentation of hand signals and slogans.

Members of the order carried a Pug medallion made of silver. In 1745, the secrets of the order were "exposed" in a book published in Amsterdam with the title L'ordre des Franc-Maçons trahi et le Secret des Mopses révélé which included the ritual and two engravings illustrating their rite.

== Bibliography ==
- Joachim Berger (publisher): Geheime Gesellschaft. Weimar und die deutsche Freimaurerei. Hanser, München 2002, ISBN 3-446-20255-2
- Abbé Larudan: Die zerschmetterten Freymäurer, Oder Fortsetzung des verrathenen Ordens der Freymäurer. Edition Cagliostro, Rotterdam 1984 (reproduction Frankfurt/M. 1746)
- Zirkel, Jahrgang 56, Nr. 4 concerning Wilhelmine von Bayreuth, sister of Frederick II of Prussia
