= Papal documents relating to Freemasonry =

There are many papal pronouncements against Freemasonry: the most prominent include:

== Before Pius IX ==
- 1738: Clement XII, In eminenti apostolatus.
- 1751: Benedict XIV, Providas Romanorum.
- 1821: Pius VII, Ecclesiam a Jesu Christo.
- 1825: Leo XII, Quo graviora.
- 1829: Pius VIII, Traditi humilitati.
- 1830: Pius VIII, Litteris altero abhinc.
- 1832: Gregory XVI, Mirari vos. (Note: "This encyclical does not mention Masonry, but religious indifferentism is one of the charges often leveled against Freemasonry in papal pronouncements. Some Roman Catholic authorities identify this pronouncement as anti-Masonic.")

== Pius IX ==
- 1846: Pius IX, Qui pluribus. (Note: "While not mentioning Masonry directly, it criticizes those it does not identify for those same faults that the previous papal pronouncements imputed to Freemasonry, and is regarded as an anti-Masonic pronouncement by some Catholic sources.")
- 1849: Pius IX, Quibus quantisque malis.
- 1864: Pius IX, Quanta cura.
- 1865: Pius IX, Multiplices inter.
- 1869: Pius IX, Apostolicae Sedis moderationi.
- 1873: Pius IX, Etsi multa.

== Leo XIII ==
- 1882: Leo XIII, Etsi Nos.
- 1884: Leo XIII, Humanum genus.
- 1887: Leo XIII, Officio sanctissimo.
- 1890: Leo XIII, Dall'alto dell'Apostolico Seggio.
- 1892: Leo XIII, Custodi di quella fede.
- 1892: Leo XIII, Inimica vis
- 1894: Leo XIII, Praeclara gratulationis publicae.
- 1902: Leo XIII, Annum ingressi.
