= Letter to U.S. Bishops Concerning Masonry =

The Letter to U.S. Bishops Concerning Masonry was a letter sent on April 19, 1985, by Bernard Francis Cardinal Law, Archbishop of Boston and chairman of the Committee on Pastoral Research and Practices of the United States Catholic Conference. The letter was intended to answer confusion about the admissibility of Masonic membership.

In 1974 a letter was written from the Congregation for the Doctrine of the Faith (CDF) leading to some Catholics claiming that certain Masonic lodges were open to Catholics. The confusion lasted after the publication of the CDF document Declaration on Masonic Associations which reiterated the ban on joining any Masonic lodge.

The Letter to U.S. Bishops reiterated the Church's ban on all types of Freemasonry, attaching reports analyzing the religious compatibility of Masonic and Catholic theologies. It is notable that it concentrated on the "naturalistic" beliefs of Freemasons rather than their alleged anti-clerical activities.

== External resources ==
- Letter from the U.S. Conference of Catholic Bishops to all U.S. Bishops on the Clarification of the Status of Catholics becoming Freemasons - Catholic Culture
