= Papal ban of Freemasonry =

The Catholic Church first prohibited Catholics from membership in Masonic organizations and other secret societies in 1738. Since then, at least eleven popes have made pronouncements about the incompatibility of Catholic doctrines and Freemasonry.

From 1738 until 1983, Catholics who associated with, or publicly supported, Masonic organizations were censured with automatic excommunication. Since 1983, excommunication is no longer automatic but optional. Pope John Paul II's 1983 Congregation for the Doctrine of the Faith's (CDF) Declaration on Masonic Associations states that "faithful who enroll in Masonic associations are in a state of grave sin and may not receive Holy Communion" and membership in Masonic associations is prohibited. (Note: CDF 1983; see CDF 1985: "membership objectively constitutes a grave sin;" see Law 1985: "Those who knowingly embrace such principles are committing serious sin." Which "implies in all cases an act of free will and being conscious of committing an intrinsically evil action.")

The most recent official Holy See documents about the "incompatibility of Freemasonry with the Catholic faith" were issued in 1985, (Note: CDF 1985, cited in Levada (2011).) and in November 2023 by the Dicastery for the Doctrine of the Faith.

== History ==
=== In eminenti apostolatus ===
1884 satirical political cartoon from Puck shows Pope Leo XIII at war with Freemasonry

In 1736, the Inquisition investigated a Masonic lodge in Florence, Italy, which it condemned in June 1737. The lodge had originally been founded in 1733 by the English Freemason Charles Sackville, 2nd Duke of Dorset, but accepted Italian members, such as the lodge's secretary Tommaso Crudeli. Also in 1736, on 26 December, Andrew Michael Ramsay delivered an oration to a Masonic meeting in Paris on the eve of the election of Charles Radclyffe as Grand Master of the French Freemasons. In March 1737 he sent an edited copy to the chief minister, Cardinal André-Hercule de Fleury, seeking his approval for its delivery to an assembly of Freemasons, and his approval of the craft in general. Fleury's response was to brand the Freemasons as traitors, and ban their assemblies. This ban, and the Italian investigation led, in 1738, to Pope Clement XII promulgating In eminenti apostolatus, the first canonical prohibition of Masonic associations.

Clement XII wrote that the reasons for prohibiting Masonic associations are that members, "content with [a] form of natural virtue, are associated with one another" by oaths with "grave penalties ... to conceal in inviolable silence whatever they secretly do together." These associations have aroused suspicions that "to join these associations is precisely synonymous with incurring the taint of evil and infamy, for if they were not involved in evil doing, they would never be so very averse to the light [of publicity] ... The rumor [of these doings] has so grown that" several governments have suppressed them "as being opposed to the welfare of the kingdom." (Note: Clement XII 1738, §1 (DH 2012, n. 2511).) Clement XII wrote that these kinds of associations are "not consistent with the provisions of either civil or canon law" since they harm both "the peace of the civil state" and "the spiritual salvation of souls." (Note: Clement XII 1738, §2 (DH 2012, n. 2512).) (Note: Clement XII had "condemned and prohibited" a category of groups, whether or not they are called Freemasons. He instructed local ordinaries and inquisitors to investigate and punish transgressors "with suitable penalties as being gravely suspect of heresy." (Note: The offense suspicion of heresy was a distinct offense from being suspected of the offense of heresy. The offense suspicion of heresy is not found in the 1983 CIC.) In context, the condemnation and prohibition by Clement XII (1738) and Cardinal Giuseppe Firrao, secretary of state, in 1739 are, according to Benimeli (2014, pp. 139–140), "nothing more than further links in the long chain of measures adopted by European authorities throughout the eighteenth century." According to Benimeli, Clement XII and Benedict XIV only added a religious reason – of suspicion of heresy – to the civil reason – of subversive activity – enacted by 18th century Catholic, Protestant, and Islamic governments against masonic associations. Firrao decreed that masonic meetings were "a danger to public peace and order" within the Papal States and were also suspected of heresy.)

=== Quo graviora ===
Pope Leo XII attempted to assess the extent and influence of anti-social organizations. He inserted and confirmed the texts of Clement XII (1738), Benedict XIV (1751), and Pius VII (1821) in his 1825 apostolic constitution, Quo graviora, "to condemn them in such a way that it would be impossible to claim exemption from the condemnation".

=== Reiteration of ban on membership by subsequent popes ===
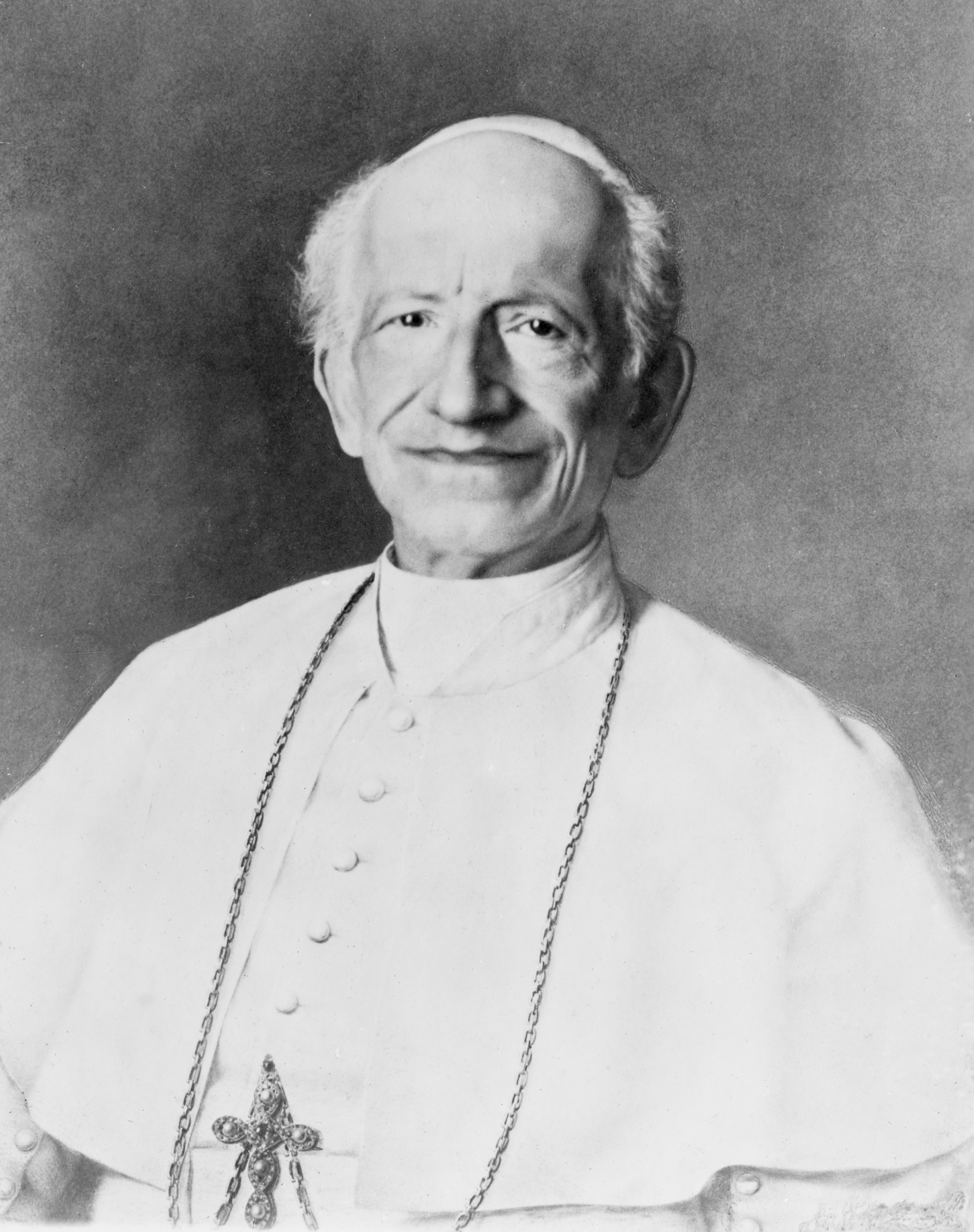
Pope Leo XIII, author of Humanum genus, which reiterated the inability of Catholics to become Freemasons

The ban in In eminenti apostolatus was reiterated and expanded upon by Benedict XIV in 1751 with Providas Romanorum, Pius VII in 1821 with Ecclesiam a Jesu Christo, Leo XII in 1825 with Quo graviora, Pius VIII in 1829 with Traditi humilitati, Gregory XVI in 1832 with Mirari vos, and Pius IX's writings of 1846, 1849, 1864, 1865, 1869, and 1873. (Note: Four papal documents – of Clement XII (1738), Benedict XIV (1751), Pius VII (1821), and Leo XII (1825) – "comprise virtually all of the legislation" about condemned secret associations before the 1917 CIC. Later papal documents relating to Freemasonry restated these four documents and various Roman congregations interpreted the law contained in them. Of those four documents, only excerpts from Clement XII 1738 are included in DH (2012, nn. 2511–2513).)

=== Humanum genus ===
"The decisive impetus for the Catholic anti-Masonic movement" was Humanum genus, promulgated by Pope Leo XIII in 1884. Leo XIII wrote that his primary objection to Masonry was naturalism; his accusations were about pantheism, rationalism, and naturalism, but not about Satanism. (Note: Masons were not characterized "as self-consciously venerating the devil" by Catholic writers prior to Léo Taxil, the perpetrator of an anti-Masonic hoax.) Leo XIII analysed continental Grand Orient type philosophical "principles and practices." While naturalism was present everywhere in other types of lodges, "the subversive, revolutionary activity characteristic of the Grand Orient lodges of the continent" was not. Leo XIII "emphasises that 'the ultimate and principal aim' of Masonry 'was to destroy to its very foundations any civil or religious order established throughout Christendom, and bring about in its place a new order founded on laws drawn out of the entrails of naturalism'." (Note: Leo XIII 1884, 10, quoted in Benimeli (2014, p. 143).)

=== Praeclara gratulationis publicae ===
In Praeclara gratulationis publicae, Leo XIII namely stated about Freemasonry: "Although We have spoken on this subject in the strongest terms before, yet We are led by Our Apostolic watchfulness to urge it once more, and We repeat Our warning again and again, that in face of such an eminent peril, no precaution, howsoever great, can be looked upon as sufficient. May God in His Mercy bring to naught their impious designs; nevertheless, let all Christians know and understand that the shameful yoke of Freemasonry must be shaken off once and for all; and let them be the first to shake it off who are most galled by its oppression–the men of Italy and of France. With what weapons and by what method this may best be done We Ourselves have already pointed out: the victory cannot be doubtful to those who trust in that Leader Whose Divine Words still remain in all their force: I have overcome the world."

=== 1917 code of canon law ===
Under the 1917 Code of Canon Law (1917 CIC), which was in effect from May 1918 to November 1983, Catholics associated with Masonry were: automatically, i.e. latae sententia, excommunicated (per canon 2335), (Note: CIC 1917, c. 2335, translated in Peters (2001, p. 740); see commentaries in Bachofen (1922, pp. 339–346), Benimeli (2014, pp. 143–144), and Woywod (1948b, pp. 530–532); developed into 1983 CIC canon 1374.) deprived of marriage in the Catholic Church, (Note: CIC 1917, c. 1065 §1, translated in Peters (2001, p. 367); see commentaries in Bachofen (1918, pp. 154–157) and Woywod (1948a, pp. 706–707); was developed into 1983 CIC canon 1071 §1 4°.) excluded from Catholic associations, (Note: CIC 1917, cc. 693 §1, 696 §2, translated in Peters (2001, pp. 262–263); see commentaries in Bachofen (1919, pp. 435, 437) and Woywod (1948a, pp. 345–347); parts of cc. 693 §1 and 696 §2 were developed into parts of 1983 CIC canons 308 and 316.) deprived of Catholic funeral rites, (Note: CIC 1917, c. 1240 §1 1°, translated in Peters (2001, p. 421); see commentaries in Bachofen (1921, pp. 152–158) and Woywod (1948a, p. 52); was developed into 1983 CIC canon 1184.) invalidated from novitiate, (Note: CIC 1917, c. 542 1°, translated in Peters (2001, pp. 210–211); see commentaries in Bachofen (1919, pp. 205–214) and Woywod (1948a, p. 243); was incorporated into 1983 CIC canon 597 §1.) invalidated reception of personal jus patronatus, (Note: CIC 1917, c. 1453, translated in Peters (2001, p. 488); see commentaries in Bachofen (1921, p. 527) and Woywod (1948b, pp. 177–178); was not developed into a 1983 CIC canon.) with additional penalties against clergy, religious, and members of secular institutes. (Note: CIC 1917, cc. 501 §2, 2336, translated in Peters (2001, pp. 195, 740–741); see commentaries in Bachofen (1918, pp. 103, 110–111, 346–347) and Woywod (1948b, pp. 501, 532); c. 501 §2 was developed into 1983 CIC canon 596.)

Under 1917 CIC, books which argue that "Masonic sects" and similar groups are "useful and not harmful to the Church and civil society" were prohibited. (Note: CIC 1917, c. 1399 8°, translated in Peters (2001, p. 471); see commentaries in Bachofen (1921, pp. 467, 473–474) and Woywod (1948b, p. 151); was not developed into a 1983 CIC canon.) (Note: The Index of prohibited books was abolished in 1965 and that function of CDF was replaced with other norms. The "right and the duty to examine and also to prevent the publication of" works as well as the rebuke and admonition of authors was devolved to episcopal conferences and individual ordinaries. In 1966, the CDF notified that although the Index "no longer has the force of ecclesiastical law with the attached censure," it "remains morally binding, in light of the demands of natural law, in so far as it admonishes the conscience of Christians to be on guard for those writings that can endanger faith and morals." The Holy See reserved use of "its right and duty to issue reprimands about these writings, even publicly.")

==== Uncertainty following the Second Vatican Council ====
The Catholic Church began an evaluation of its understanding of Masonry during (but not at (Note: Bishop Sergio Méndez Arceo, of Cuernavaca, Mexico, asked Vatican II to discuss secret societies and Masonic associations. Arceo and others proposed that not all Masonry machinated against the Catholic Church.)) Vatican II. (Note: Vatican II reversed a thousand years of legal history of the Latin Church. The Vatican II dogmatic constitution on the Church, Lumen gentium (LG ), and the Vatican II decree on the pastoral office of bishops, Christus Dominus (CD ), explain that the scope of a diocesan bishop's power is ordinary, proper, and immediate; and is limited and regulated "though the supreme authority of the Church" in the form of canon law or papal decree. Because of this, significant changes in practice were then legislated to implement Vatican II. The norms in Paul VI 1966b implemented concessions prescribed in CD, n. 8. See commentaries in McIntyre (2000, pp. 128, 130) and Renken (2000a, p. 503).) Throughout the jubilee of 1966, Pope Paul VI granted every confessor the faculty to absolve censures and penalties of 1917 Code of Canon Law's canon 2335 incurred by penitents who completely separated themselves from Masonic association and promised to repair and prevent, as far as possible, any scandal and damage they caused.

After a four-year investigation in five Scandinavian Bishops' Conference (CES) countries, the CES decided in 1967 to apply the 1966 post-conciliar norms in De Episcoporum Muneribus, "which empowers bishops in special cases to dispense from certain injunctions of Canon Law." (Note: The CES based their decision "on the claim that Scandinavian Masonry was fundamentally different from American and European Masonry," that it was Christian, and that Swedish Rite masonry was not anticlerical or atheistic. According to the CES secretary, Bishop John Willem Gran, of Oslo, the CES had not received any comments from the Holy See about their 1967 decision. Likewise, Gran (1968) contradicted misrepresentations of fact in a Tablet (1968d) paragraph, which Gran attributed to a widely repeated Le Monde article, and corrected that the CDF did not privately reply to a CES bishop that "it was 'possible but not advisable' for a Catholic to join.") The CES permitted, within its jurisdiction, converts to Catholicism to retain their Swedish Rite membership, "but only with the specific permission of that person's bishop."

In early 1968, The Tablet reported that Vatican sources had "been quoted as saying that Catholics are now free to join the Masons in the United States, Britain and most other countries of the world. However, the European Grand Orient Lodge of Masons, established primarily in Italy and France, is still considered anti-Catholic or, at least, atheistic," and that "the CDF 'let it be known that Catholics joining the Freemasons are no longer automatically excommunicated. The Church's new attitude has been in effect for more than a year.' The Church's Code of Canon Law drawn up in 1918 and shortly to be reformed, provided for automatic excommunication of Catholics 'who enroll in the Masonic sect or in secret societies conspiring against the Church or the legitimate authorities.' Vatican sources added that this wording would be changed to modify the Church's position when the new Code of Canon Law was completed." These reports apparently caused consternation in the Vatican, and were quickly corrected. The Holy See publicly said that 1917 CIC canon 2335 was not abrogated, and denied it planned to "change profoundly" its historic prohibition against Catholics joining Masonic groups, (Note: Tablet 1968a, quoted in Tablet (1968b).) although confidential sources said "a change in attitude in the future was considered possible." (Note: The confusion did not end there, for example, during the 20 years after Vatican II, the British press "regularly reported, with amazement," about a pending rapprochement which contrasted with a Catholic toughening after the 1981 Propaganda Due (P2) clandestine lodge scandal and revelations of its machination against the state.)

Informal dialogues between Catholic Church and Masonic representatives took place after Vatican II in Austria, Italy and Germany. In Austria, Freemason Karl Baresch, representative of the Grand Lodge of Austria, informally met Cardinal Franz König, president of the Secretariat for Non-Believers, at Vienna in 1968. Later, a commission of Catholic Church and Masonic representatives conducted a dialogue and produced the 1970 Lichtenau Declaration, an interpretative statement directed at Paul VI; Cardinal Franjo Šeper, prefect of the CDF; and other Catholic authorities. It "contained serious faults in philosophical-theological and, above all, historical terms," according to Professor Zbigniew Suchecki, and "was never officially recognized by" the Catholic Church.

In 1971, Bishop Daniel Pézeril, auxiliary bishop of Paris, accepted an invitation from the Grande Loge de France to lecture. This was the first official reception of a Catholic bishop after 1738.

While some speculated about post-conciliar revision of canon law and how norms would be legislated and enforced, the canonical prohibition against Catholics joining Masonic groups remained in force in 1974.

The Catholic Bishops' Conference of England and Wales (CBCEW) stated in 1974 that consultations with the world's bishops failed to produce consensus about the Catholic Church's relationship with Masonry. The CDF (1974) wrote that many bishops had asked it about how to weight and interpret 1917 CIC canon 2335. The divergent replies it gave reflected different situations in various countries. The CDF reiterated that 1917 CIC canons which establish a penalty are subject to strict interpretation, (Note: CDF 1974; Tablet 1974. See CIC 1917, nn. 19, 49–50, translated in Peters (2001, pp. 36, 44); see commentaries in Bachofen (1918, pp. 98–99, 137–139) and Woywod (1948a, pp. 14, 35).) so canon 2335 applied only to Catholics who were members of Masonic associations that machinate against the Church. The CBCEW interpreted CDF 1974 as instructing bishops that 1917 CIC canon 2335 "no longer automatically bars a Catholic from membership of Masonic groups" since it is subject to strict interpretation, and that "a Catholic who joins the Freemasons is excommunicated only if the policy and actions of the Freemasons in his area are known to be hostile to the Church." So, the CBCEW defined norms within its jurisdiction, that Catholics, who believed that membership in Masonic associations "does not conflict" with their "deeper loyalty" to their incorporation in the Catholic Church, should "discuss the implications of such membership" with their parish priest. Likewise, Catholics in Masonic associations were "urged to seek reconciliation."

==== German Bishops' Conference ====
In 1980, after six years of dialogue with representatives of the United Grand Lodges of Germany and investigation of Masonic rituals, the DBK produced a report on Freemasonry listing twelve conclusions.

Among the DBK's conclusions were that Freemasonry denies revelation, (Note: DBK 1980, n. 1, as translated in Jenkins (1996), quoted in Gantley (2006a); see CBCP (2010, n. 37 at p. 19).) and objective truth. (Note: DBK 1980, n. 2, as translated in Jenkins (1996), quoted in Gantley (2006a).) They also alleged that religious indifference is fundamental to Freemasonry, (Note: DBK 1980, n. 3, as translated in Jenkins (1996), quoted in Gantley (2006a).) and that Freemasonry is Deist, (Note: DBK 1980, n. 4 as translated in Jenkins (1996), quoted in Gantley (2006a).) and that it denies the possibility of divine revelation, (Note: DBK 1980, n. 5 as translated in Jenkins (1996), quoted in Gantley (2006a).) so threatening the respect due to the Church's teaching office. (Note: DBK 1980, n. 6, as translated in Jenkins (1996), quoted in Gantley (2006a).) The sacramental character of Masonic rituals was seen as signifying an individual transformation, (Note: DBK 1980, n. 7, as translated in Jenkins (1996), quoted in Gantley (2006a); see CBCP (2010, n. 45 at p. 23).) offering an alternative path to perfection (Note: DBK 1980, n. 8, as translated in Jenkins (1996), quoted in Gantley (2006a).) and having a total claim on the life of a member. (Note: DBK 1980, n. 9, as translated in Jenkins (1996), quoted in Gantley (2006a).) It concludes by stating that all lodges are forbidden to Catholics, (Note: DBK 1980, n. 10, as translated in Jenkins (1996), quoted in Gantley (2006a).) including Catholic-friendly lodges. (Note: DBK 1980, n. 11, as translated in Jenkins (1996), quoted in Gantley (2006a).) (Note: The DBK noted that German Protestant churches were also suspicious of Freemasonry.)

==== Šeper's clarification ====
The 1981 CDF Declaration Concerning Status of Catholics Becoming Freemasons said that the 1974 CDF reply had "given rise to erroneous and tendentious interpretations." The 1981 CDF declaration also affirmed that the prohibition against Catholics joining Masonic groups had not changed and remained in effect.

=== 1983 code of canon law ===
The Catholic Church abrogated and replaced the 1917 CIC with the 1983 Code of Canon Law (1983 CIC) which took effect in November 1983. 1917 CIC canon 2335 developed into the 1983 CIC's canon 1374. Unlike the abrogated 1917 CIC canon 2335, however, 1983 CIC canon 1374 does not name any groups it condemns; it states:

A person who joins an association which plots against the Church is to be punished with a just penalty; (Note: See canon 1349, a just penalty is an indeterminate penalty which allows the exercise of discretion in imposition of penalties based on the circumstances of individual cases. According to canon lawyer Edward N. Peters, the term just penalty "means that a penalty (e.g., [...] interdict, excommunication) can be tailored to fit the crime." Canon lawyer Cathy Caridi wrote that CDF (1983) "provides a theological interpretation of canon 1374." Caridi commented that, according to CDF (1983), "a diocesan bishop or chancery official cannot grant permission in a particular case for a member of the diocese to become a Mason.") one who promotes or takes office in such an association is to be punished with an interdict.

This omission led some Catholics and Freemasons, especially in America, to believe that the ban on Catholics becoming Freemasons might have changed, (Note: "Some [Freemasons] and some Catholics believe," according to Reid McInvale, that since Vatican II "the attitude of the church has been to regard Freemasonry as an acceptable sphere for fraternal interaction.") and caused confusion in the church's hierarchy. (Note: Bernard Law wrote that "many bishops" replied "to an earlier survey that confusion had been generated by a perceived change of approach by the" CDF.) Many Catholics joined the fraternity, basing their membership on a permissive interpretation of Canon Law and justifying their membership by their belief that Freemasonry does not plot against the Church. (Note: "In good faith many of these men had asked their pastors and/or bishops for permission to join the Lodge. Some converts were received into the Church during these years and were not asked to relinquish their Masonic affiliation.")

The Catholic Church uses two parallel codes of canon law: the 1983 CIC in the Latin Church of the Catholic Church and the 1990 Code of Canons of the Eastern Churches (1990 CCEO) in the sui iuris Eastern Catholic Churches of the Catholic Church. 1983 CIC canon 1374 and 1990 CCEO canon 1448 §2 are parallel canons. (Note: All censures in 1990 CCEO are imposed judicially or administratively; it does not include any automatic latae sententia censures.) 1983 CIC canon 1374 differentiates between being a member of a forbidden association and being an officer or promoter but 1990 CCEO canon 1448 §2 does not.

==== Declaration on Masonic Associations ====
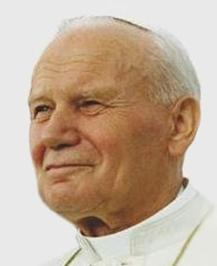
Pope John Paul II, who personally approved the 1983 Declaration on Masonic Associations from the Congregation for the Doctrine of the Faith

In 1983, Cardinal Joseph Ratzinger, who later became Pope Benedict XVI, prefect of the Congregation for the Doctrine of the Faith, with the personal approval of Pope John Paul II, issued a Declaration on Masonic Associations, which reiterated the Church's objections to Freemasonry. The 1983 declaration states that "faithful who enroll in Masonic associations are in a state of grave sin and may not receive Holy Communion. ... the Church's negative judgment in regard to Masonic association(s) remains unchanged since their principles have always been considered irreconcilable with the doctrine of the Church and therefore membership in them remains forbidden. CDF 1983 "stipulated that neither" CDF 1974 nor CDF 1981 "allowed an individual bishop or bishops' conferences to permit Catholics to belong to Masonic lodges."

==== Continued ban after the declaration ====
A United States Conference of Catholic Bishops (USCCB) committee concluded in its 1985 Letter to U.S. Bishops Concerning Masonry that "the principles and basic rituals of Masonry embody a naturalistic religion active participation in which is incompatible with Christian faith and practice." (Note: Whalen 1985, quoted in Law (1985).) "Those who knowingly embrace" Masonic "principles are committing serious sin" and, according to Law's parenthetical commentary on Whalen, that offense might be punishable under canon 1364. According to that canon, an apostate, heretic, or schismatic incurs a latae sententiae excommunication and clerics can be punished with additional expiatory penalties including dismissal from the clerical state. Caparros et al. elucidates that, in cases where "registration into an association entails apostasy, heresy, or schism" then the offense is punishable under canon 1364. Nevertheless, citing CDF (1983), Caparros et al. states that "those Masonic associations that would not be covered by" canon 1374 have "principles [which] are still seen to be incompatible with the doctrine of the Church." Every delict in canon law is a sin. The "distinction between penal law and morality" is, according to the USCCB committee, that not all sins are violations in canon law – so in a case where a sin is not also a violation or delict in canon law, it is a fallacy to conclude that "it is permissible to commit it." (Note: Whalen 1985, quoted in Law (1985); see Green (2000a, p. 1529).) "Referring specifically to the secrecy of Masonic organisations," CDF 1985 "reiterated the ban on Masonic membership" in CDF 1983. According to McInvale (1992), the CDF (1985) "argues that Masonry establishes a relativistic symbolic concept of morality unacceptable to Catholicism."

In 1996, Bishop Fabian Bruskewitz of the Diocese of Lincoln legislated that Catholic members of Masonic associations in the diocese, incur a latae sententiae censure of a one-month interdict during which they are forbidden to receive holy communion; those who continue membership incur a latae sententiae censure of excommunication. Those excommunications which were challenged through a process of canonical recourse were affirmed by a judgment of the Holy See in 2006.

In 2000, David Patterson, executive secretary of the Masonic Service Bureau of Los Angeles, asked Cardinal Roger Mahony "whether a practicing Catholic may join a Masonic Lodge." Father Thomas Anslow, Judicial Vicar of the Archdiocese of Los Angeles, replied to Patterson that "the matter is too complex for a straightforward 'yes' or 'no' answer. But at least for Catholics in the United States, I believe the answer is probably yes." Because he was "unaware of any ideology or practice by the local lodges that challenges or subverts the doctrine and interests of the Catholic Church," Anslow wrote that his "qualified response" is "probably yes." Anslow publicly retracted his 2000 letter in 2002, with the explanation that his analysis was faulty. He wrote that, according to the CDF (1985) reflection about the CDF (1983) declaration, "the system of symbols" used in Masonry can "foster a 'supraconfessional humanitarian'" conception of "the divine that neutralizes or replaces the faith dimension of our relationship with God." (Note: CDF 1985, quoted in Anslow (2002).)

In 2002, the Catholic Bishops' Conference of the Philippines decreed that:

- a Catholic who is a "publicly known" Freemason – who "actively participates" or "promotes its views" or "holds any office" – and refuses to renounce his membership after being warned in accord with 1983 CIC canon 1347, "is to be punished with an interdict," in accord with 1983 CIC canon 1374, including: exclusion from receiving the sacraments; prohibition against acting as a sponsor in Baptism and Confirmation; prohibition against being a member of any parish or diocesan structure; and denial of Catholic funeral rites, unless some signs of repentance before death were shown, regardless, to avoid public scandal in a case where a bishop allows funeral rites, Masonic services are prohibited in the church and prohibited immediately before or after the Catholic funeral rites at the cemetery.
- a Catholic who is a Freemason, "notoriously adhering to the Masonic vision," is automatically excommunicated under canon 1364 and is automatically censured in accord with 1983 CIC canon 1331
- a Freemason is prohibited from acting a witness to marriage in the Catholic Church, and prohibited from being a member of any associations of the faithful

The Masonic Information Center pointed out in 2006 that CDF 1983, which prohibits membership in Masonic associations, "remains in effect."

Bishop Gianfranco Girotti, regent of the Apostolic Penitentiary, told the 2007 Freemasonry and the Catholic Church conference, at the Pontifical Theological Faculty of St. Bonaventure in Rome, that doctrine has not changed. Girotti, quoting the CDF 1983 declaration, reiterated that Masonic philosophy is incompatible with Catholic faith. (Note: Zenit 2007, cited in Besse (2007).) Likewise, reacting to the news of an 85-year-old Catholic priest, Rosario Francesco Esposito, becoming a member in a Masonic lodge, Girotti told Vatican Radio in May 2007 that the CDF 1983 declaration "remains in force today." Girotti called on priests who had declared themselves to be Freemasons to be disciplined by their direct superiors.

In 2013, a Catholic priest at Megève, France, was "stripped of his functions at the request of the" CDF for being an active member of the Grand Orient de France.

In 2023, the Dicastery for the Doctrine of the Faith reiterated that Catholics are forbidden from joining Freemasonry, quoting the 1983 Ratzinger document. The decision was signed by Cardinal Víctor Manuel Fernández, prefect for the Dicastery, and approved by Pope Francis.

== Current position of the Church on Catholics joining the fraternity ==
The Catholic Church's current norm on Masonic associations is the 1983 CDF Declaration on Masonic associations. (Note: The CDF 1983 declaration is a simple declaration which must be interpreted in the context of other existing legislation. It reiterated CDF (1981a) which clarified the Church's doctrine that the historic prohibition against Catholics joining Masonic groups remained.) The 1983 CDF declaration states that Catholics "who enroll in Masonic associations are in a state of grave sin and may not receive Holy Communion."

The 1983 CDF declaration clarified the omission of association names in 1983 Code of Canon Law (1983 CIC) by stating that the "editorial criterion which was followed" did not mention association names since "they are contained in wider categories." 1983 CIC canon 1374 states that a Catholic "who joins an association which plots against the Church is to be punished with a just penalty; one who promotes or takes office in such an association is to be punished with an interdict." This contrasted with the 1917 Code of Canon Law (1917 CIC), which explicitly declared that joining Freemasonry entailed automatic excommunication. The omission of association names, like Masonic associations, from the 1983 CIC prompted Catholics and Masons to question whether the ban on Catholics becoming Freemasons was still active, especially after the perceived liberalization of the Church after Vatican II.

A number of Catholics became Freemasons assuming that the Church had softened its stance. (Note: According to Whalen (1985), from 1974 to after 1981, "an undetermined number of Catholic men joined the Lodge, and many presently maintain membership. Articles in the Catholic press ' told readers that under certain circumstances a Masonic membership was allowed. The general public, Catholic and non-Catholic, assumed the Church had softened its stand against membership in Freemasonry.") The 1983 CDF declaration addressed this misinterpretation of the Code of Canon Law, clarifying that:

...the Church's negative judgment in regard to Masonic association remains unchanged since their principles have always been considered irreconcilable with the doctrine of the Church and therefore membership in them remains forbidden.

The "irreconcilable principles" that the Church believes Freemasonry possesses include a "deistic God," (Note: "The nature of the Masonic God is best seen in their favorite title for him: the Supreme Architect. The Masonic God is first of all a deistic God, who is found at the top of the ladder of Masonic wisdom",) naturalism, and religious indifferentism. (Note: According to Law (1985), DBK (1980) and Whalen (1985) "confirm that the principles and basic rituals of Masonry embody a naturalistic religion active participation in which is incompatible with Christian faith and practice.")

Near the time that the 1983 CDF declaration was released, bishops' conferences in Germany and America also released independent reports on the question of Freemasonry. The conclusions of the German Bishops' Conference (DBK) in its 1980 report on Masonry and cited by the U.S. Conference of Catholic Bishops (USCCB) in its 1985 letter included that "research on the ritual and on the Masonic mentality makes it clear that it is impossible to belong to the Catholic Church and to Freemasonry at the same time."

Some of the doctrines are incorporated into Catholic social teaching which are, in the Compendium of the Social Doctrine of the Church, to appreciate democratic political systems which are accountable to the governed and to "reject all secret organizations that seek to influence or subvert the functioning of legitimate institutions."

According to Cardinal Gianfranco Ravasi, president of the Pontifical Council for Culture, DBK (1980) and CBCP (2010) "are significant texts as they address the theoretical and practical reasons for the irreconcilability of masonry and Catholicism as concepts of truth, (Note: Masonry is opposed to the concept of supernatural truth.) religion, (Note: For example, Whalen (1985) wrote that "whatever constitutes 'that religion in which all men agree', it is not Christianity or revealed religion." Masonic studies is a field in the academic study of new religious movements. Speculative masonry does not fit categories in the church-sect-cult typology of religious movements. Masonry asserts that it is a fraternal organization and neither a religion nor a substitute for religion, others assert that it exhibits the features of a religion, some assert that it is a religion. In contrast, some assert that it is impossible to conclude "that Freemasonry is religious.") God, man and the world, spirituality, ethics, rituality and tolerance."

== Freemasonry's position on Catholics joining the fraternity ==
Masonic bodies do not ban Catholics from joining if they wish to do so. There has never been a Masonic prohibition against Catholics joining the fraternity, and some Freemasons are Catholics, despite the Catholic Church's prohibition of joining the freemasons.

== See also ==
- Anticlericalism and Freemasonry
- Anti-Masonry
- Nicodemites
- Christianity and Freemasonry
- Papal documents relating to Freemasonry
- Religious Issue (Brazil)

== Sources ==
- Anslow, Thomas C. (11 September 2000). "May Catholics become Freemasons?". Letter to David Patterson, executive secretary of the Masonic Service Bureau of Los Angeles. Archived from the original on 1 May 2001 – via msana.com. (Reply to Patterson's letter of inquiry directed to Cardinal Mahoney.)
- ——— (12 February 2002). "[Retraction of letter dated 2000-09-11]". Letter to David Patterson, executive secretary of the Masonic Service Bureau of Los Angeles. Archived from the original on 11 February 2006 – via archdiocese.la.
- Bachofen, Charles A. (1918). "A commentary on the new Code of the canon law. V.1.". A commentary on the new code of the canon law. New Code of canon law, A commentary on the. Vol. 1 (2nd ed.). St. Louis, MO; London: B. Herder book. hdl:2027/wu.89097198154. OCLC 608970346.
- ——— (1919). "A commentary on the new Code of the canon law. V.3.". A commentary on the new code of the canon law. New Code of canon law, A commentary on the. Vol. 3 (2nd ed.). St. Louis, MO; London: B. Herder book. hdl:2027/wu.89097198170. OCLC 608970346.
- ——— (1921). "A commentary on the new Code of the canon law. V.6.". A commentary on the new code of the canon law. New Code of canon law, A commentary on the. Vol. 6. St. Louis, MO; London: B. Herder book. hdl:2027/wu.89097198196. OCLC 608970346.
- ——— (1922). "A commentary on the new Code of the canon law. 8.". A commentary on the new code of the canon law. New Code of canon law, A commentary on the. Vol. 8. St. Louis, MO; London: B. Herder book. hdl:2027/wu.89059250977. OCLC 608970346.
- Baudier, Roger (1939). The Catholic Church in Louisiana. New Orleans: A.W. Hyatt Stationery. OCLC 5010311.
- Beal, John P; Coriden, James A; Green, Thomas J, eds. (2000). "New Commentary on the Code of Canon Law". New commentary on the Code of Canon Law (study ed.). New York: Paulist Press. ISBN 0809105020.
  - Faris, John D. "An overview of the Code of Canons of the Eastern Churches". In Beal et al. (2000), pp. 27–44.
  - Green. "Sanctions in the Church: Introduction". In Beal et al. (2000), pp. 1529–1533.
  - Green. "The application of penalties". In Beal et al. (2000), pp. 1558–1566.
  - Green. "Delicts against ecclesial authorities and the freedom of the Church". In Beal et al. (2000), pp. 1580–1585.
  - McIntyre, John P. "Dispensations". In Beal et al. (2000), pp. 126–137.
  - Renken, John A. "Particular churches and the authority established in them: Introduction". In Beal et al. (2000), pp. 501–503.
  - Renken. "Diocesan bishops". In Beal et al. (2000), pp. 518–540.
- Benimeli, José A. Ferrer (2014). "Freemasonry and the Catholic Church". In Bogdan, Henrik; Snoek, Jan A. M. (eds.). Handbook of Freemasonry. Brill handbooks on contemporary religion. Vol. 8. Leiden: Brill. ISBN 9789004218338.
- Benedict XIV, Pope (1751). "Providas Romanorum". freemasonry.bcy.ca.
- Besse, Gail (7 September 2007). "Can Catholics also be Masons?". thebostonpilot.com. Boston: Archdiocese of Boston. Archived from the original on 16 April 2015.
- Bouscaren, T. Lincoln; Ellis, Adam C.; Korth, Francis N. (1963). Canon law: a text and commentary (4th rev. ed.). Milwaukee, WI: Bruce. OCLC 716992.
- Bruskewitz, Fabian W. (22 March 1996) [1996-03-19]. "Statement of Bishop Bruskewitz excommunicating certain groups". Southern Nebraska Register. Denver, CO: Catholic Press Society. Roman Catholic Diocese of Lincoln. ISSN 0744-6950. Archived from the original on 12 September 2012 – via catholicculture.org.
- Calderwood, Paul (2013). Freemasonry and the press in the twentieth century: a national newspaper study of England and Wales. Farnham [u.a.]: Ashgate. ISBN 9781409454335.
- Caparros, Ernest; Thériault, Michel; Thorn, Jean, eds. (1993). "Code of Canon Law Annotated: Latin-English Edition of the Code of Canon Law and English-language Translation of the 5th Spanish-language Edition of the Commentary". Code of Canon Law annotated: Latin-English edition of the Code of Canon Law and English-language translation of the 5th Spanish-language edition of the commentary prepared under the responsibility of the Instituto Martín de Azpilcueta. Montréal: Wilson & Lafleur. pp. 1070–1071. ISBN 2891272323.
- Caridi, Cathy (25 September 2008). "Can Catholics become Freemasons?". canonlawmadeeasy.com (blog). Rome: Cathy Caridi. Archived from the original on 20 November 2012.
- Carnes, Mark C. (1989). Secret ritual and manhood in Victorian America. New Haven: Yale University Press. p. 4. ISBN 9780300044249.
- Catholic Bishops' Conference of the Philippines (6 July 2002). "Joint declaration of the CBCP on sanctions for Catholics who join Freemasonry". CBCP Monitor. Vol. 14, no. 13. Intramuros, Manila: CBCP Media Office (published 21 June – 4 July 2010). p. B3. OCLC 316259717.
- ——— (2010) [2003]. A primer on freemasonry (PDF) (CBCP Media Office for the Knights of Columbus of the Philippines abridged ed.). Manila: Catholic Bishops' Conference of the Philippines Publications. ISBN 978-971-8915-23-3. Archived (PDF) from the original on 22 July 2016 – via frgeorgewillmann.org.
- Clement XII, Pope (28 April 1738). "In eminenti apostolatus specula". papalencyclicals.net. Archived from the original on 12 February 2012.
- Prepared under the auspices of the Canon Law Society of America (4 November 2003). Code of Canon Law (from 2001 Latin-English print ed.). Vatican City: Libreria Editrice Vaticana – via vatican.va.
- Prepared under the auspices of the Canon Law Society of America (17 July 2007). Code of Canons of the Eastern Churches (from 1992 Latin-English print ed.). Rome, IT: Èulogos SpA – via intratext.com.
- Congregation for the Doctrine of the Faith (14 June 1966). "Notification regarding the abolition of the Index of books". vatican.va. Archived from the original on 7 March 2014.
- ——— (17 February 1981). "Declaratio de canonica disciplina quae sub pœna excommunicationis vetat ne catholici nomen dent sectae massonicae aliisque eiusdem generis associationibus". Acta Apostolicae Sedis (in Latin). 73 (3). Vatican City (published 3 April 1981): 240–241 – via vatican.va.
  - Congregation for the Doctrine of the Faith (1974-07-18). "Complures episcopi". In CDF (1981b), fn 1.
- ——— (17 February 1981). "Declaration concerning status of Catholics becoming Freemasons". vatican.va. Archived from the original on 8 December 2010. (This English translation does not include CDF 1974 which is included in the Latin typical edition: CDF 1981b.)
- ——— (26 November 1983). "Declaration on Masonic associations". vatican.va. Archived from the original on 14 March 2001.
- ——— (23 February 1985). "Reflections one year after the declaration of the Congregation for the Doctrine of the Faith: irreconcilability between Christian faith and Freemasonry". L'Osservatore Romano. Vatican City (published 11 March 1985). Archived from the original on 5 May 2007 – via vatican.va.
- Denzinger, Heinrich; Hünermann, Peter; et al., eds. (2012). "Compendium of Creeds, Definitions, and Declarations on Matters of Faith and Morals". Enchiridion symbolorum: a compendium of creeds, definitions and declarations of the Catholic Church (43rd ed.). San Francisco: Ignatius Press. ISBN 978-0898707465.
- German Bishops' Conference (12 May 1980). "Zur Frage der Mitgliedschaft von Katholiken in der Freimaurerei" [To the question of the membership of Catholics in Freemasonry]. Archiv für katholische Kirchenrecht (in German). 149. Mainz: Kirchheim. ISSN 0003-9160.
- One or more of the preceding sentences incorporates text from this source, which is in the public domain: Egan, Maurice F.; Kennedy, John B. (1920). The Knights of Columbus in peace and war. Vol. 1. New Haven: Knights of Columbus. p. 52. hdl:2027/hvd.hn323j. OCLC 656613674.
- Gantley, Mark J. (19 March 2006). "Free Masons". ewtn.com. Irondale, AL: Eternal Word Television Network. Archived from the original on 9 July 2016.
- ——— (10 December 2006). "Freemasonry". ewtn.com. Irondale, AL: Eternal Word Television Network. Archived from the original on 9 July 2016.
- Gran, John W. (8 June 1968). "Freemasons in Scandinavia". Letters to the editor. The Tablet. London. p. 580. ISSN 0039-8837. Archived from the original on 8 September 2016.
- One or more of the preceding sentences incorporates text from this source, which is in the public domain: Guilday, Peter (1922). The life and times of John Carroll. Vol. 2. New York: Encyclopedia Press. hdl:2027/uc2.ark:/13960/t86h4q191. OCLC 697982721.
- One or more of the preceding sentences incorporates text from this source, which is in the public domain: Guilday, Peter (1932). A history of the councils of Baltimore, 1791–1884. New York: Macmillan. hdl:2027/wu.89064466170. OCLC 609187759.
- Hennesey, J. (2003). "Baltimore, Councils of". In Carson, Thomas; et al. (eds.). New Catholic encyclopedia. Vol. 2 (2nd ed.). Washington, DC: Catholic University of America. pp. 41–47. ISBN 9780787676940.
- This article incorporates text from a publication now in the public domain: Gruber, Hermann (1910). "Masonry (Freemasonry)". In Herbermann, Charles (ed.). Catholic Encyclopedia. Vol. 9. New York: Robert Appleton Company. pp. 771–788.
- Hackett, David G. (2014). "Jews and Catholics, 1723-1920". That religion in which all men agree: Freemasonry in American culture. Berkeley: University of California Press. ISBN 9780520957626.
- Jenkins, Ronny E. (1996). "The Evolution of the Church's prohibition against Catholic membership in Freemasonry". The Jurist. 56. Washington, DC: Catholic University of America Press: 735–755. ISSN 2326-6236.
- Jolicoeur, Pamela M.; Knowles, Louis L. (Autumn 1978). "Fraternal associations and civil religion: Scottish Rite Freemasonry". Review of Religious Research. 20 (1). New York: Religious Research Association: 3–22. doi:10.2307/3509938. ISSN 0034-673X. JSTOR 3509938.
- Kauffman, Christopher J. (1992). Faith and fraternalism: the history of the Knights of Columbus (Rev. ed.). New York: Simon & Schuster. ISBN 9780133009897.
- Law, Bernard (19 April 1985). "Concerning Masonry". Letter to U.S. Bishops. Archived from the original on 9 July 2016 – via catholicculture.org.
- Leo XII, Pope (1825). "Quo graviora". papalencyclicals.net.
- Leo XIII, Pope (20 April 1884). "Humanum genus". vatican.va. Archived from the original on 14 December 2014.
- Levada, William (12 October 2011). "The integrity of faith: major documents of the Congregation for the Doctrine of the Faith in the post-conciliar period". vatican.va. Archived from the original on 13 June 2012.
- Lewis, James R.; Tøllefsen, Inga B., eds. (2016). The Oxford Handbook of New Religious Movements. Vol. 2. Oxford University Press. doi:10.1093/oxfordhb/9780190466176.001.0001. ISBN 9780190466176.
  - Bogdan, Henrik. "Western esotericism and new religious movements". In Lewis & Tøllefsen (2016).
  - Lewis & Tøllefsen. Introduction. In Lewis & Tøllefsen (2016).
- Luijk, Ruben van (2016). Children of Lucifer: the origins of modern religious Satanism. Oxford studies in Western esotericism. New York: Oxford University Press (published June 2016). doi:10.1093/acprof:oso/9780190275105.001.0001. ISBN 9780190275105.
- One or more of the preceding sentences incorporates text from this source, which is in the public domain: Macdonald, Fergus (1946). McMahon, Thomas J. (ed.). The Catholic church and the secret societies in the United States. Monograph series. Vol. 22. New York: United States Catholic historical Society. hdl:2027/mdp.39015004055102. OCLC 576718108.
- Madison, Bill; Dryfoos, Gary L. (22 June 2004) [c. 1995]. "Timeline of relations between the Roman Catholic Church and the Freemasons". web.mit.edu/dryfoo/Masonry. Cambridge, MA: Gary L. Dryfoos. Archived from the original on 24 October 2012.
- Masonic Information Center (August 1998) [December 1993]. "Statement on Freemasonry and Religion" (Press release) (Rev. ed.). Burtonsville, MD: Masonic Service Association of North America. Archived from the original on 6 November 2006.
- McFeely, Tom (19 December 2006). "Vatican backs 'Call to Action' excommunications". National Catholic Register. Includes contribution by Catholic News Service. Circle Media. ISSN 0027-8920. Archived from the original on 18 September 2012.
- McInvale, Reid (c. 1992) [presented 1992-06-13]. "Roman Catholic Church law regarding Freemasonry". Transactions. 27. Waco, TX: Texas Lodge of Research A.F. & A.M. OCLC 10269407. Archived from the original on 27 January 1999 – via a personal website.
- Melton, J. Gordon, ed. (2009). "Western esoteric family I: ancient wisdom". Melton's encyclopedia of American religions (8th ed.). Detroit: Gale. pp. 687–700. ISBN 9780787663841.
- Morrissey, F. G. (2003). "Pronouncements, papal and curial". In Carson, Thomas; et al. (eds.). New Catholic encyclopedia. Vol. 11 (2nd ed.). Detroit: Gale. pp. 747–748. ISBN 9780787676940.
- Paul VI, Pope (7 December 1965). "Mirificus eventus". vatican.va (in Latin). Archived from the original on 2 April 2016.
- ——— (3 May 1966). "Summi Dei beneficio". vatican.va (in Latin). Archived from the original on 10 July 2015.
- ——— (15 June 1966). "De Episcoporum Muneribus". vatican.va (in Latin). Archived from the original on 10 July 2015.
- ——— (6 August 1966). "Ecclesiae Sanctae". vatican.va. Archived from the original on 29 January 2015.
- Peters, Edward N., ed. (2001). The 1917 or Pio-Benedictine code of canon law: in English translation with extensive scholarly apparatus. Translated by Peters, Edward N. San Francisco: Ignatius Press. ISBN 9780898708318.
- ——— (28 December 2005). "Fake priests". canonlaw.info (blog). s.l.: Edward Peters. Archived from the original on 7 February 2006.
- ——— (2 November 2015). "A glance back at a forgotten canonical category". canonlawblog.wordpress.com (blog). s.l.: Edward Peters. Archived from the original on 21 November 2015.
- Pius VII, Pope (1751). "Ecclesiam a Jesu Christo". lycos.fr (in French). Archived from the original on 7 March 2004.
- Pontifical Council for Justice and Peace (2004). Compendium of the social doctrine of the Church (Reprint ed.). Vatican City: Libreria Editrice Vaticana (published 2005). ISBN 9788820977160.
- Quigley, Joseph (1926). Condemned societies (unpublished dissertation). Washington DC: Catholic University of America. (This unpublished 1926 dissertation and Quigley's published 1927 dissertation are both cited in Macdonald (1946).)
- One or more of the preceding sentences incorporates text from this source, which is in the public domain: Quigley, Joseph (1927). Condemned societies (JCD). Canon Law Studies. Vol. 46. Washington DC: Catholic University of America. hdl:2027/mdp.39015033865620. OCLC 603022188.
- Ravasi, Gianfranco (14 February 2016). "Cari fratelli massoni" (PDF). Il Sole 24 Ore (in Italian). Milan: Il Sole. p. 29. ISSN 0391-786X. Archived (PDF) from the original on 20 March 2016 – via grandeoriente.it.
- Scottish Rite Cathedral Assn. of Los Angeles v. City of Los Angeles, 67 Cal. Rptr. 3d 207 (Cal. App. 4th 2007) ("In light of the Masonic practices and principles [...] we see no principled way to distinguish [...] pursuit of these [Masonic] principles, [...] and [...] forms of religious worship, from more widely acknowledged modes of religious exercise. [In fn.:] Although Freemasonry does not identify itself as a religion [...] it plainly fosters principles and practices that resemble religious exercise under [two tests used to determine qualification as a religion].").
- Stemper, William H. Jr.; Beck, Guy L. (2005). "Freemasons". In Jones, Lindsay (ed.). Encyclopedia of religion. Vol. 5 (2nd ed.). Detroit: Macmillan Reference USA. pp. 3193–3199. ISBN 9780028657332 – via Gale Virtual Reference Library.
- Suchecki, Zbigniew (August–September 2007). "Is Freemasonry incompatible with the Catholic faith?". Inside the Vatican (Interview). Interviewed by Redzioch, Wlodzimierz. New Hope, KY: Urbi et Orbi Communications. pp. 44–45. ISSN 1068-8579. Archived from the original on 30 March 2014 – via catholicculture.org.
- Taves, Ann; Kinsella, Michael (2014) [2013]. "Hiding in plain sight: the organizational forms of 'unorganized religion' ". In Sutcliffe, Steven J.; Gilhus, Ingvild Sælid (eds.). New Age spirituality: rethinking religion. London: Routledge. ISBN 9781317546245.
- Vatican II (21 November 1964). Lumen gentium.
- ——— (28 October 1965). Christus Dominus.
- ——— (7 December 1965). Gaudium et spes.
- Whalen, William J. (1967). "Freemasonry". In McDonald, William J. (ed.). New Catholic encyclopedia. Vol. 6 (1st ed.). New York: McGraw-Hill. pp. 132–139. OCLC 174793343. (The 2nd edition, published in 2002, does not contain a Freemasonry article.)
- Whalen, William A. (27 June 1985). The pastoral problem of masonic membership (Report commissioned by the Pastoral Research and Practices Committee of the United States Conference of Catholic Bishops). CNS Documentary Service. Archived from the original on 9 July 2016 – via catholicculture.org.
- Woywod, Stanislaus (1948a) [1943]. Smith, Callistus (ed.). A practical commentary on the Code of canon law. Vol. 1 (Rev. and enl. ed.). New York: J. F. Wagner. hdl:2027/mdp.35112104152493. OCLC 746242376.
- ——— (1948b) [1943]. Smith, Callistus (ed.). A practical commentary on the Code of canon law. Vol. 2 (Rev. and enl. ed.). New York: J. F. Wagner. hdl:2027/mdp.35112104152501. OCLC 746242376.
- "Ban on Freemasonry reconfirmed". The Tablet. London. 10 December 1983. pp. 1210–1211. ISSN 0039-8837. Archived from the original on 22 July 2016.
- "Ban on Masons reaffirmed". The Tablet. London. 9 March 1985. p. 251. ISSN 0039-8837. Archived from the original on 4 October 2015.
- "Bishop at Masonic Lodge". The Tablet. London. 17 July 1971. p. 705. ISSN 0039-8837. Archived from the original on 9 September 2016.
- "Canon Law regarding Freemasonry, 1917–1983". freemasonry.bcy.ca. Vancouver: Grand Lodge of British Columbia and Yukon A.F. & A.M. 16 March 2001. Archived from the original on 5 January 2002.
- "Change on Masonry denied". The Tablet. London. 23 March 1968. p. 291. ISSN 0039-8837. Archived from the original on 11 September 2015.
- "Clarification concerning status of Catholics becoming Freemasons". ewtn.com. Irondale, AL: Eternal Word Television Network. Archived from the original on 28 November 1999.
- "Clarification on Masons". The Tablet. London. 18 May 1968. p. 509. ISSN 0039-8837. Archived from the original on 11 September 2015.
- "English Catholics and Freemasonry". The Tablet. London. 23 November 1974. p. 1149. ISSN 0039-8837. Archived from the original on 6 September 2016.
- "Freemasonry: your questions answered". ugle.org.uk. London: United Grand Lodge of England. 2002. Archived from the original on 28 January 2004.
- "French priest defrocked after refusing to forsake Freemasonry". france24.com. Paris: France 24. Agence France-Presse. 25 May 2013. Archived from the original on 25 May 2013.
- "Go-ahead for Catholic Masons". The Tablet. London. 16 March 1968. p. 267. ISSN 0039-8837. Archived from the original on 6 September 2016.
- "Masonic lodge membership is gravely sinful, Vatican official says". catholicculture.org. Manassas, VA: Trinity Communications. Catholic World News. 5 March 2007. Archived from the original on 10 June 2011.
- "Masons & Communists". The Tablet. London. 15 December 1973. p. 1210. ISSN 0039-8837. Archived from the original on 8 September 2016.
- "Rappel des valeurs de la laïcité" [Reminder of the values of secularism]. godf.org (Press release) (in French). Paris: Grand Orient de France. 9 November 2007. Archived from the original on 14 October 2007.
- "Regent restates Vatican's anti-Masonry position: says its philosophies are incompatible with church". zenit.org. New York: Innovative Media. Zenit News Agency. 2 March 2007. Archived from the original on 6 March 2007.
- "Relations with the Roman Catholic Church". Focus (newsletter). Burtonsville, MD: Masonic Service Association of North America. Masonic Information Center. April 2006. Archived from the original on 24 July 2008.
- "The Masons and the Church". The Tablet. London. 30 March 1968. p. 322. ISSN 0039-8837. Archived from the original on 12 September 2015.
