= In eminenti apostolatus =

1738 papal bull regarding Freemasons

In eminenti apostolatus specula is a papal bull issued in Rome by Pope Clement XII on 28 April 1738, banning Catholics from becoming Freemasons. It arose from Jacobite-Hanoverian rivalry on the continent.

== Background ==
Freemasonry had developed in England in the seventeenth century, but after 1715 had split into Jacobite and Hanoverian lodges. The lodge in Rome was Jacobite (pro Stuart) and mainly Catholic, but admitted Protestants, while that in Florence was Protestant Hanoverian but also admitted Catholics and atheists who supported the Whig position. As Clement was from Florence, he did not view a prominent Protestant fraternity in his hometown favorably.

James Francis Edward Stuart was living as James III of England in Rome where he conducted a Jacobean court in exile. In 1737 he learned that Hanoverian Freemasons had recruited so many French Catholics that they had taken control of the Grande Loge de France from the Jacobites. He asked Clement XII to issue a papal bull condemning Hanoverian Freemasonry in the Catholic countries of Europe.

At the same time, Cardinal André-Hercule de Fleury was chief minister of Louis XV of France. Fleury was focused on maintaining peace with Britain. Jacobite sympathizers in France had formed a secret lodge of Freemasons; their attempts to influence Fleury to support the Stuart faction led instead to raids on their premises, and Fleury urged Pope Clement XII to issue a bull that forbade all Roman Catholics from becoming Freemasons under threat of excommunication.

Clement wished to accommodate the pretender while not antagonizing Britain nor opposing Fleury's foreign policy. The bull was drafted from a religious rather than the political viewpoint and did not distinguish between Jacobean and Hanoverian Freemasonry.

== Content ==
Clement noted that membership of Masonic Lodges, "spreading far and wide and daily growing in strength", was open to men of any religion or sect, who were sworn to secrecy. He referred to them by name as Franco-Massones and Liberi Muratores, noting that they also have other names in various languages, and condemning them by whatever name they might be known.

The logic at the heart of the bull is expressed as follows:

"But it is in the nature of crime to betray itself and to show itself by its attendant clamor. Thus these aforesaid Societies or Conventicles have caused in the minds of the faithful the greatest suspicion, and all prudent and upright men have passed the same judgment on them as being depraved and perverted. For if they were not doing evil they would not have so great a hatred of the light."

The bull goes on to note that the growing rumor had caused "several countries" which considered it a threat to their own security to cause such associations to be "prudently eliminated". (Note: The States General of the Netherlands had prohibited all masonic meetings on 30 November 30 1735.) An expressed danger was the private rules that bound members, "that they do not hold by either civil or canonical sanctions".

As a result, all Catholic participation in Masonry was prohibited, and bishops were to proceed against it "as well as inquisitors for heresy...calling upon the aid of the secular arm", as it was under suspicion of heresy, partly because of its already notorious secrecy.

== Later developments ==
Catholic secret societies, which mirrored Freemasonry but were technically distinct from it so as to avoid the Papal Bull banning Catholics from it, sprang up in response, notably the Order of the Pug in Germany.

That Catholics are still prohibited from joining Masonic organizations was confirmed in 1983 by the Congregation for the Doctrine of the Faith.

== See also ==
- Papal documents relating to Freemasonry
- Anti-Masonry
- Christianity and Freemasonry
- Papal ban on Freemasonry
- Declaration Concerning Status of Catholics Becoming Freemasons
