= Indifferentism =

Belief about religion or philosophy

Indifferentism is the belief that no one religion or philosophy is superior to another.

Political indifferentism describes the policy of a state that treats all the religions within its borders as being on an equal footing before the law of the country.

Religious indifferentism is the belief that all religions are equally valid. However, in Catholic usage, religious indifference is a term for "deny[ing] that it is the duty of man to worship God by believing and practicing the one true religion".

== Philosophical positions ==
Immanuel Kant argues that absolute indifferentism represents an extreme form of skepticism, which argues that there is no rational ground for accepting any philosophical position.

== Catholic Church ==
=== Catholic teachings on indifferentism ===
According to the Catholic Church, absolute indifferentism results in a willingness to concede any position.

=== Restricted indifferentism ===
Catholicism also opposes as "indifferentism" a spectrum of pragmatic ideas that admit the necessity of religion because of its positive influence on human life, but which hold that all religions are equally true. A classic advocate of this theory is Jean-Jacques Rousseau, who maintains, in his Emile: Or, On Education, that God looks only to the sincerity of intention, and that everybody can serve him by remaining in the religion in which they were raised, or by converting to any other that pleases them more. This position is sometimes held by agnostics, on the grounds that it is impossible to attain certain religious knowledge, and that a God who has allowed such uncertainty will be pleased with whatever sincere form of worship he is offered.

From a Roman Catholic perspective, to say that all these irreconcilable beliefs are equally pleasing to God is to say that God has no preference for truth and to deny reason. The Roman Catholic Church argues that restricted indifferentism is no different from absolute indifferentism because, while nominally acknowledging the utility of religion, to affirm that "all religions are equally good" ultimately means that religion is good for nothing.

=== Liberal or latitudinarian indifferentism ===
The Catholic Church also resists as indifferentism the belief that, since Christianity is the true religion, it makes no difference which of the several Christian denominations a person joins. Catholicism criticizes Protestantism specifically for this sort of limited indifferentism, describing many Protestant denominations as latitudinarians who do not claim any particular fidelity to the gospel and who maintain that all forms of worship may be equally effective for the purpose of building a closer union with God.

Since the Second Vatican Council the Catholic Church has adopted a more committed approach towards ecumenism, although the Council warned against forms of common worship which called for the acceptance of error or created a danger of indifferentism, and the Pontifical Council for Promoting Christian Unity has warned against the danger of doctrinal indifferentism within ecumenical dialogue.

== See also ==
- Apatheism
- Inclusionism
- Religious pluralism
- Trivialism – Logical theory
