= Christian attitudes towards Freemasonry =

While many Christian denominations either allow or take no stance on their members joining Freemasonry, others discourage or prohibit their members from joining the fraternity.

== Catholic Church ==
The Roman Catholic Church has been among the most persistent critics of Freemasonry. The Church has prohibited its members from being Freemasons since the papal bull In eminenti apostolatus, promulgated in 1738 by Pope Clement XII. Since then, the Vatican has issued several papal bulls banning the membership of Catholics in Freemasonry under threat of excommunication. In 1983, the Canon Law was changed to read, "A person who joins an association that plots against the Church is to be punished with a just penalty; however, a person who promotes or directs an association of this kind is to be punished with an interdict", eliminating the penalty of excommunication for Masons. Joseph Ratzinger, who later became Pope Benedict XVI, wrote in a letter that those who enroll in Masonic associations are in a state of grave sin and may not receive Holy Communion. The penalty of excommunication is not declared in the current code of canon law, but membership remains forbidden. The aforementioned letter does not form part of Canon Law and, during his tenure, Benedict XVI did not make any attempt to change Canon Law to explicitly mention the ban on Freemasonry.

The Catholic Church argues that the philosophy of French Freemasonry (the Grand Orient, not the dominant variety of Freemasonry or the branch that is active in the English-speaking world) is antithetical to Christian doctrine and that it is at many times and places anti-clerical in intent. The 1913 Catholic Encyclopedia argued that some of the ceremonials in the Scottish Rite and the Masonic use of Biblical imagery are anti-Catholic.

From the earliest pontifical documents on the subject, and in particular in the Encyclical Humanum Genus by Pope Leo XIII (20 April 1884), the Magisterium of the Church, which may not change, has denounced philosophical ideas and moral conceptions in Freemasonry that were considered opposed to Catholic doctrine. For Leo XIII, they essentially led back to a rationalistic naturalism, the inspiration of its plans and activities against the Church.

During the late nineteenth and early twentieth centuries, conflict between Catholicism and Freemasonry broke out into disputes over secular education, discrimination in employment, and in some European countries, the expulsion of religious orders.

=== Catholic ban on Freemasonry since the Second Vatican Council ===
In 1974, Cardinal Franjo Šeper, Prefect of the Congregation for the Doctrine of the Faith, sent a letter that seemed to relax the previous absolute ban on Freemasonry, causing confusion and leading many Catholics to become Freemasons. In 1981, the Congregation clarified this stance in a letter to the United States Conference of Catholic Bishops, entitled Declaration Concerning Status of Catholics Becoming Freemasons, stating that Šeper's private letter, now made public, had engendered unfavorable interpretations of Catholic doctrine. The Congregation's letter also affirmed that the prohibition against Catholics joining Masonic orders remained. In 1983, the Church revised the Code of Canon Law in a way that did not mention Freemasonry, causing some Freemasons to claim that the ban on Catholics becoming Freemasons may have been lifted. Later that same year, the Vatican reaffirmed the ban. In 2000, a letter written by Father Thomas Anslow, a judicial vicar, indicated a more permissive attitude to Freemasonry, although this was retracted two years later, with Anslow claiming that the analysis was faulty. In 2023, Pope Francis maintained the Catholic position on Freemasonry.

=== Theological objections ===
One of the persistent Catholic criticisms of Freemasonry is that it advocates a deist or naturalist view of creation.

Whilst it is recognized that Masonry is not atheistic (Masons aligned with the United Grand Lodge of England are asked if they believe in God or another supreme being before joining and only accept candidates that do), its use of the expression Supreme Architect of the Universe—a term attributed to the Protestant theologian John Calvin—is seen by some Christian critics as indicating Deism, the belief that God created the Universe but did not intervene in the world after this. This was a common sentiment that arose in the Enlightenment, though Catholics consider it heresy. As a counter-argument, Freemasonry contends that “Supreme Architect” is a neutral term acceptable to all, regardless of sect or denomination: It merely reflects the fraternity’s desire to bring together members of all deity based religions, by not using any one specific religion’s term for their supreme being.

A specific charge made in the 1913 Catholic Encyclopedia against Freemasonry is that the introduction of speculative Masonry in the early eighteenth-century specifically aimed at "dechristianising" the old operative masonry lodges. However, this charge was dropped from subsequent editions.

Whereas the constitutions of previous lodges of operative Masonry stated that "The first charge is this, that you be true to God and Holy Church and use no error or heresy", in 1723, the constitution of the Grand Lodge of England was modified to state that Masons are no longer expected to follow the religion of the country they live in and, now, were only obliged to follow the moral law, regardless of denominations. This change is construed by the Catholic Church as moving towards a deistic view.

Catholics also object to various rituals and teachings of Freemasonry:

"...the higher degrees of Masonry’s Appendant Bodies are frankly blasphemous. The Royal Arch Degree of the York Rite reveals that the true name of God is JAH-BUL-ON, a fusion of the Hebrew Jaweh (Yaweh) with the names of pagan gods Baal and Osiris. The Scottish Rite’s eighteenth degree (Rose Croix) reinterprets the Cross and its I.N.R.I inscription as pagan symbols. A candidate for the thirtieth degree (Knight Kadosh) must trample the papal tiara crying: “Down with Imposture!” He vows to propagate light and overthrow “superstition, fanaticism, imposture, and intolerance,” qualities implicitly identified with Christianity, especially Catholic Christianity."

=== Separation of church and state ===
American Freemasons are consistent advocates of freedom of religion, as found in the First Amendment of the US Constitution. The idea that the Establishment Clause means a strict separation of church and state is interpreted by the Catholic Church as a veiled attack on its place in public life. It called opposition to state religion "Religious Indifferentism", by which no religion was acknowledged as true or revealed. The papacy also described Freemasonry as a leader in the cause of popular sovereignty, as the 1913 Catholic Encyclopedia noted. Some specific areas in which Freemasons were accused of aiming for an improper separation of church and state were:

- Compulsory state-supported secular education in Italy in 1882, entailing a prohibition on religious education. Christians also complained that "religious houses [were] suppressed, the goods of the Church confiscated, marriages contracted in despite of the laws and without the rites of the Church."
- The introduction of civil marriage in Mexico in 1857

=== Religious indifference ===
Catholic critics of Freemasonry observe that it refuses to promote one faith as being superior to any others, while at the same time it also uses rituals that can appear religious to outsiders. That combination is seen as inculcating an indifference to religion.

The Masonic author Mackey called Freemasonry "a science which is engaged in the search after the divine truth".

Anderson's The Constitutions of the Free-Masons, 1723, likens the guidance of moral truth to a religion in which all men agree and said that the specifics of a Mason’s religious faith are his own opinion to leave to himself. Freemasons reply that not obliging a member to profess a certain religious viewpoint as a condition of membership is not the equivalent of asserting that no religion can be superior to any other. Personal theological beliefs are not to be discussed in the lodge, thus avoiding arguments with those holding different beliefs. It has been suggested that this ban on religious discussion was especially important in eighteenth-century England where a civil war, in part caused by religious conflict, had only recently ended.

=== Oaths and curses ===
The Church also objects to the oaths taken by Freemasons, some of which involve the prospective Mason swearing that if he ever reveals the secrets of Masonry, he would be willing to be subject to mutilation or execution, though Catholics acknowledge these punishments are rarely if ever actually carried out. Some Catholics, particularly priests who work in exorcism ministry, also believe that the oaths sworn by Freemasons constitute curses which can be passed down to the descendants of the Freemason, particularly when Freemason oaths involve swearing on descendants. The concept of generational curses is a subject of debate within the Church. For these and other reasons, many Catholics believe Freemasonry is directly Satanic.

== Protestantism ==
Although many Protestant denominations do not prohibit or discourage their members from joining Masonic lodges, nor have they issued any position papers condemning Freemasonry, other churches have formally opposed Masonry and spoken of the problems they see with Christians belonging to Masonic lodges. The United Brethren Church, the first American denomination not transplanted from Europe, is one such denomination that formally forbids its members from joining a Masonic lodge.

=== Opposing stance ===
There is a range of intensity among those Protestant denominations which discourage their congregants from joining Masonic lodges. Most of these denominations tend to be either evangelical Protestant or other neo-Protestant. Among Protestants opposed to Freemasonry are the Evangelical Lutheran Synod, the Wisconsin Evangelical Lutheran Synod, the Church of the Nazarene, the Salvation Army, Mennonites, The North American Mission Board of the Southern Baptist Convention, Lutheran Church – Missouri Synod, Christian Reformed Church in North America, Church of the Brethren, Assemblies of God, Society of Friends (Quakers), Free Methodist church, Seventh-day Adventist Church, Orthodox Presbyterian Church, Free Church of Scotland, Baptist Union of Great Britain and Ireland, Presbyterian Church in America, Reformed Presbyterian Church of Ireland, Dutch Reformed Church in South Africa (NGK). Most of these condemnations resulted from the work of church committees appointed only in recent decades. Many of these Protestant condemnations have never been enforced.

=== Neutral stance or no position ===
In some instances, these are relatively small church bodies which broke from the mainline Protestant denominations in recent decades, citing as their reason their opposition to theological liberalism or diversity. The largest by far of the Lutheran, Presbyterian, and Methodist church bodies in the US have not taken a stand against Freemasonry, and many Masons are active members of them. The Episcopal Church, the largest of the Anglican churches in the U.S., has taken no stance against Masonry, nor have the various smaller continuing Anglican and independent Anglican church bodies.

The Evangelical Lutheran Church in America (ELCA), the largest Lutheran denomination in the United States and a progressive, mainline Protestant denomination, takes no stance on its lay congregants being members of Masonic organizations including Blue Lodge Freemasonry, Scottish Rite Freemasony, York Rite Freemasony, the Ancient Arabic Order of the Nobles of the Mystic Shrine (Shriners), or the Order of the Eastern Star (OES). However, the ELCA does prohibit its clergy from being members of Masonic organizations at any time. The ELCA Churchwide Constitution was first ratified in 1987 with the creation of the denomination and states, "No person who belongs to any organization such as a lodge or fraternal order which claims to possess in its teachings and ceremonies that which the Lord has given solely to the Church shall be called and received onto the roster of Ministers of Word and Sacrament or otherwise received into the ministry of this church, nor shall any person so-called and received onto the roster of Ministers of Word and Sacrament or otherwise received by this church be retained in its ministry who subsequently joins or is discovered to be a member of such an organization." This ban on "lodge or fraternal order" membership for clergy also extends to other organizations like the Benevolent and Protective Order of Elks (Elks Lodge), the Loyal Order of Moose (Moose Lodge), and the Swedish-American Vasa Order of America. This neutral stance on lay membership is in contrast to the other two main Lutheran denominations in the United States, the Wisconsin Evangelical Lutheran Synod and the Lutheran Church – Missouri Synod, who prohibit both their lay members and their clergy from membership in any Masonic-related organizations without exception.

The Church of England does not have a clear stance on the matter. While there have been Anglican Freemasons, since the 1980s, some Anglican bishops and priests have made negative judgements about Freemasons, for theological reasons. In July 1987, the General Synod endorsed a report which considered the compatibility of Freemasonry and Christianity. The report stated "The reflections of the Working Group itself reveal understandable differences of opinion between those who are Freemasons and those who are not. Whilst the former fully agree that the Report shows that there are clear difficulties to be faced by Christians who are Freemasons, the latter are of the mind that the Report points to a number of very fundamental reasons to question the compatibility of Freemasonry and Christianity."

The Church of Scotland does not ban congregants from becoming Freemasons, but in 1989 the general assembly said there were "very real theological difficulties" with Church of Scotland members being Freemasons.

The 1985 Conference of the Methodist Church of Great Britain said that Freemasonry competed with Christian beliefs, discouraged (but did not prohibit) Methodists from becoming Freemasons and asked Methodist Freemasons to reconsider their membership of Freemasonry. The Conference banned the use of Methodist premises for Masonic meetings, though a 1989 source reported some Masonic meetings were taking place on Methodist premises. The 1996 Methodist Conference revisited the 1985 position in the light of developments in Freemasonry, concluding that there were still "hesitations about the wisdom" of a Methodist joining a Masonic lodge, though it affirmed there was no absolute bar on a Methodist being a Freemason. The 1996 Conference stated there were unresolved concerns relating to openness of Freemasonry and compatibility of Masonic practice with Christian doctrine despite "positive changes that have taken place within Freemasonry in recent years". The 1985 ban on the use of Methodist premises for Masonic meetings remained in place following the 1996 discussions.

The Southern Baptist Convention is mistakenly understood to prohibit Freemasonry, but leaves such as a matter of individual conscience, largely due to the findings within the SBC 1993 Report on Freemasonry, in which it states:

In light of the fact that many tenets and teachings of Freemasonry are not compatible with Christianity and Southern Baptist doctrine, while others are compatible with Christianity and Southern Baptist doctrine, we therefore recommend that consistent with our denomination's deep convictions regarding the priesthood of the believer and the autonomy of the local church, membership in a Masonic Order be a matter of personal conscience. Therefore, we exhort Southern Baptists to prayerfully and carefully evaluate Freemasonry in the light of the Lordship of Christ, the teachings of the Scripture, and the findings of this report, as led by the Holy Spirit of God.

=== Approving stance and acknowledgement ===
Many historical, traditional, and mainline Protestant denominations in mainland Europe officially do not prohibit Freemasonry. An example is the Evangelical Lutheran Church in Northern Germany, a member church of the Evangelical Church in Germany. It recognizes Freemasons among its members and sometimes the Masons hold public ceremonies in the historic St. Michael's Church, Hamburg.

== Eastern Orthodoxy ==
Some Eastern Orthodox Churches have condemned Freemasonry.

In 1933, the Synod of the Church of Greece condemned Freemasonry, forbade all clerics to be members of it, and demanded that church members break all relations with Freemasonry. In 1937, a condemnation was declared by the Church of Romania, followed by a condemnation in the 1950s by the Orthodox Church in America and the Russian Orthodox Church Outside Russia. According to the website of the Orthodox Church in America, "It is forbidden for an Orthodox Christian to be a member of the Masonic Fraternity because many of its teachings stand in direct conflict with those of Orthodox Christianity."

== The Church of Jesus Christ of Latter-day Saints ==
As of 2019, The Church of Jesus Christ of Latter-day Saints has taken the position that its members may become Freemasons, and that Freemasons may be baptized into the LDS Church. Some people, however, see links between the two movements in practice, structure, and symbolism, which go back to the church's origins.

Although the impact of Freemasonry in LDS Church doctrine is the subject of intense debate, it is believed by some that Joseph Smith Sr., the father of the church's founder and first president, Joseph Smith, became a Freemason in 1816. Recent research casts doubt on this belief. Joseph Smith, likewise, became a Freemason in 1842, when the church was headquartered in Nauvoo, Illinois. He and hundreds of his followers—including his first four successors as church president—all became Freemasons. Shortly after becoming a Freemason, Smith introduced the church's temple endowment ceremony, which contained some symbols and language closely paralleling some of the rituals of Freemasonry.

When the LDS Church relocated to Utah in 1847 after Smith's death, Brigham Young allegedly attempted and failed to establish Masonic Lodges in the Utah Territory. This alleged failure was supposedly due to several factors; the LDS Church's practice of polygamy and the strong anti-Mormon sentiment of the era would have been significant factors. Distrust between LDS Church members and Masons grew throughout the second half of the 1800s.

Many Freemasons who were not members of the LDS Church harbored strong anti-Mormon sentiments that started in Nauvoo. Soon after Smith and his followers were initiated, the Grand Lodge of Illinois was compelled to revoke the charters of several predominantly Latter-day Saint lodges due to anti-Mormon sentiment and rumors of irregularities. In 1872, the Grand Lodge of Utah was formed and in 1925 implemented a policy prohibiting members of the church from become Masons or from associating with Utah lodges from out-of-state. The church also began to discourage its members from joining any "oath-bound" fraternities or "secret societies" without naming Freemasonry specifically, eventually codifying it in the Church Handbook of Instructions. In 1984, The Grand Lodge of Utah rescinded its ban on members of the church, after the proposal failed in 1983. Subsequently, the church removed language from the Church Handbook of Instructions that discouraged members from joining oath-bound fraternities. The Encyclopedia of Mormonism, a quasi-official 1992 publication, clarified the church's position by stating that "the philosophy and major tenets of Freemasonry are not fundamentally incompatible with the teaching, theology, and doctrines of the Latter-day Saints."

Unlike many American Christian churches in the 21st century, the LDS Church does not currently have an anti-Masonic position. There is no formal barrier preventing a male from being both a member of the church and a Mason, and many have elected to do so. In 2008, Glen Cook, a practicing Latter-day Saint, became the Grand Master of the Grand Lodge of Utah, and subsequently held national and international Masonic offices. Mark E. Koltko-Rivera, another Latter-day Saint Freemason, authored an introduction to Freemasonry entitled Freemasonry: An Introduction.

== Philippine Independent Church ==
The Philippine Independent Church, officially the Iglesia Filipina Independiente (IFI), do not prohibit Freemasonry and allows its clergy and members to join Masonic organizations. Its earliest members and supporters, who are widely recognized national heroes of the country, were notable Freemasons. Its first Supreme Bishop and co-founder Gregorio Aglipay was a high-ranking Mason in the Philippines. Aglipay joined Masonry in 1918, sixteen years after the proclamation of the independent catholic denomination. At present, the church recognizes Freemasons among its members. Some of its bishops and high-ranking church officials are active members of Masonic lodges. The church firmly stands that Freemasonry is not a religion, nor a substitute for religion, and is not in conflict with their doctrines and practices as Christians. The church also refutes that Freemasonry is connected to Satanism, contrary to popular belief.

== New religion ==
Freemasonry unambiguously states that it is not a religion, nor a substitute for religion. There is no separate "Masonic" God, nor is there a separate proper name for a deity in any branch of Freemasonry. In keeping with the geometrical and architectural theme of Freemasonry, the Supreme Being is referred to in Masonic ritual by the attributes of Great Architect of the Universe (sometimes abbreviated as G.A.O.T.U.), Grand Geometer, or something similar. Freemasons use these varied forms of address to make clear that the reference is generic and not about any one religion's particular identification of God.

Nevertheless, Freemasonry has been criticized as being a substitute for Christian belief. For example, the New Catholic Encyclopedia states the opinion that Freemasonry becomes a rival to Catholicism by displaying all of the elements of a religion, including altars, prayers, worship, and the promise of reward or punishment in the afterlife, among other things commonly seen in religions.

== Links to Esotericism ==
Certain types of Freemasonry, most notably the Swedish Rite, are said to be connected to Esoteric Christianity, which holds that Orthodox Christian doctrine is for the duller masses and that "real" Christianity holds the secret knowledge concerning the sacrifice of Christ on Golgotha.

=== Pre-Christian pagan influences ===
The 1917 edition of the Catholic Encyclopedia says that the Masonic authors Clavel, Ragnon, Pike and Mackey claim Masonic symbolism is rooted in the solar and phallic worship of pre-Christian mystery religion, particularly Egyptian religion.

=== Rosicrucian influences ===
The Rosicrucian symbol of the Rose Cross is also found in certain rituals of appendant bodies to Freemasonry which require candidates to be Master Masons.

Many Anti-Masonic Christian authors have stated that Rosicrucian Robert Fludd (1574–1637) was a Mason. However, there is no evidence supporting this contention. Nor is there any documented evidence to support Arthur Edward Waite's (1857–1942) speculation that Fludd may have introduced a Rosicrucian influence into Freemasonry. Robert Vanloo states that earlier 17th century Rosicrucianism had a considerable influence on "Anglo-Saxon" Masonry.

A list of groups linked to both Freemasonry and Rosicrucianism, which requires for membership admission to be Christian and Master Mason (see websites), includes:

- Societas Rosicruciana in Anglia, 1866
- Societas Rosicruciana in Civitatibus Foederatis, 1880

Manly Palmer Hall, a noted occultist and author on Masonic topics, wrote a book called Rosicrucian and Masonic Origins in 1929 (long before he ever became a Mason) and the Rosicrucian author Max Heindel wrote a book in the 1910s, both of which portray Catholicism and Freemasonry as being two distinct streams in the development of Christianity.

== Claims of Satan worship and response ==
Some Christian critics of Freemasonry, often evangelical Christians, and all the Orthodox Christian Churches claim that Freemasonry involves the worship of the fallen angel named Satan. Such claims are often supported by quoting, misquoting, or quoting out of context various individuals, both Masonic and non-Masonic, but not Masonic ritual itself.

Below are some of the more common quotations used on the internet in the attempt to establish the claim that Masons worship Satan, with some notes about them:

=== Waite ===
First Conjuration Addressed to Emperor Lucifer. Emperor Lucifer, Master and Prince of Rebellious Spirits, I adjure thee to leave thine abode, in what-ever quarter of the world it may be situated and come hither to communicate with me. I command and I conjure thee in the Name of the Mighty Living God, Father, Son and Holy Ghost, to appear without noise and without ....

This quote is often attributed to "Arthur Edward Waite, 33°" on Christian Anti-Masonic websites, as if it were an authoritative statement from a "high level" Mason, but Waite is not identified as a 33rd degree Mason anywhere in the book the quote is taken from. He is described simply as an individual with an interest in the occult. Waite was not a Mason when he wrote this book (the book was written and published in 1898; Waite became a Mason in 1902). Additionally, according to the Masonic research document "The Lie of Luciferianism" Waite was never a 33rd degree Mason; he never joined the Scottish Rite. He was, however, a "high level" member of the Hermetic Order of the Golden Dawn, a magical order based on an initiated lodge model similar to Freemasonry.

=== Hall ===
I hereby promise the Great Spirit Lucifer, Prince of Demons, that each year I will bring unto him a human soul to do with as it may please him, and in return Lucifer promises to bestow upon me the treasures of the earth and fulfil my every desire for the length of my natural life. If I fail to bring him each year the offering specified above, then my own soul shall be forfeit to him. Signed..... {Invocant signs pact with his own blood}

This passage is from Manly Palmer Hall's The Secret Teachings of All Ages (specifically, the chapter "Ceremonial Magic and Sorcery."). As with Waite, Christian Anti-masons use this quotation as if it were an "authoritative" statement from a "high level" Mason. However, as with Waite, Hall is not identified as a 33° Mason anywhere in the book, nor is there a record of his reception of the 33° cited in any readily available source that does not include the above quotation. According to the Grand Lodge of British Columbia and Yukon, Hall was initiated into Freemasonry, but not until 1954, when he was 53 years old. The secret Teachings of All Ages was published in 1928, when he was only 27. More importantly, the quotation is taken out of context. Hall is not discussing Freemasonry at all, but rather summarizing how a magician would invoke a spirit and giving an example of how a demonic pact might read. Hall was an occultist, and according to one source, was a well-established lecturer on the occult and other esoterica by the age of 20, before he was even eligible to become a Mason.

When The Mason learns that the Key to the warrior on the block is the proper application of the dynamo of living power, he has learned the Mystery of his Craft. The seething energies of Lucifer are in his hands and before he may step onward and upward, he must prove his ability to properly apply this energy.

This quotation appears in Hall's The Lost Keys Of Freemasonry. It appears in Chapter 4 (titled "The Fellowcraft") which has nothing to do with the actual Fellowcraft degree. The passage is again taken out of context, and its meaning changes when it is put back into the context of the chapter it comes from: it is part of a larger philosophical discussion which can also be read to imply that the improper use of "energies" can make the Mason a tool of Satan. Furthermore, even taken out of context, this passage does not refer to worshipping Satan per se. As with the previous quotation from Secret Teachings of All Ages, the book was written well before Hall became a Mason. In his Introduction to the book Hall clearly states: "At the time I wrote this slender volume, I had just passed my twenty-first birthday, and my only contact with Freemasonry was through a few books commonly available to the public".

=== Blavatsky ===
"Satan, or Lucifer, represents the active, or, as M. Jules Baissac calls it, the 'Centrifugal Energy of the Universe' in a cosmic sense. He is Fire, Light, Life, Struggle, Effort, Thought, Consciousness, Progress, Civilization, Liberty, Independence. At the same time he is pain, which is the Re-action of the pleasure of action, and death — which is the revolution of life — Satan, burning in his own hell, produced by the fury of his own momentum — the expansive disintegration of the nebulæ which is to concentrate into new worlds"

This quotation is taken from Helena Blavatsky's magnum opus, The Secret Doctrine, and is often presented by Anti-Masons as evidence of Satanism on the part of Freemasonry. This passage is quite regularly taken out of its context as Blavatsky makes extensive use of symbols and types in communicating occult doctrine. Furthermore, Blavatsky was not associated with Freemasonry and nor did she ever claim to be.

=== Pike and Taxil ===
Yes, Lucifer is God, and unfortunately Adonay is also God. For the eternal law is that there is no light without shade, no beauty without ugliness, no white without black, for the absolute can only exist as two Gods: darkness being necessary to light to serve as its foil as the pedestal is necessary to the statue, and the brake to the locomotive.

Albert Pike is frequently quoted by Christian Anti-Masons, often with the quotation taken out of context. However, in this case the statement was not even written by Pike. It was included in a letter which con artist Leo Taxil claimed was from Pike, and was later demonstrated to be a forgery.

=== Crowley ===
The occultist Aleister Crowley, who called himself "The Great Beast 666" claimed to be a Freemason, and his association with Freemasonry is one major reason why some conservative Christians see it as an occult organization. According to Martin P. Starr, all of the lodges and organizations Crowley joined and founded were considered irregular.

== See also ==
- Anti-Freemasonry
