= Declaration Concerning Status of Catholics Becoming Freemasons =

February 1981 declaration by the Congregation for the Doctrine of the Faith

The Declaration Concerning Status of Catholics Becoming Freemasons is a February 1981 declaration by the Congregation for the Doctrine of the Faith (CDF) under Cardinal Franjo Šeper which restated the Catholic Church's prohibition against Catholics becoming Freemasons.

It contains three points of "confirmation and clarification" about "erroneous and tendentious interpretations" of a leaked 1974 private clarification, on interpretation of 1917 Code of Canon Law canon 2335, (Note: See commentaries on 1917 CIC canon 2335, which was in effect May 1918 to November 1983, in Bachofen (1922, pp. 339–346) and Woywod (1948, pp. 530–532).) from the CDF to episcopal conferences:

1. "canonical discipline remains in full force and has not been modified in any way"
2. "neither the excommunication nor the other penalties envisaged have been abrogated"
3. the intention of the 1974 letter was to remind about "the general principles of interpretation of penal laws for the solution of the cases of individual persons which may be submitted to the judgment of ordinaries" and not "to permit Episcopal Conferences to issue public pronouncements by way of a judgment of a general character on the nature of Masonic associations, which would imply a derogation from the aforesaid norms".

The confusion arose from a leaked 1974 private clarification written to some episcopal conferences, which was interpreted by some within the Church and within Freemasonry as permitting Catholics to join Masonic lodges so long as the lodge did not directly plot against the church. The letter had become public and had "given rise to erroneous and tendentious interpretations."

The 1974 private clarification stated that:

1. "the Holy See has repeatedly sought information from the bishops about contemporary Masonic activities directed against the Church"
2. "there will be no new law on this matter," in the period before the 1983 Code of Canon Law is promulgated
3. "all penal canons must be interpreted strictly"
4. to reiterate, Catholic clergy, and members of religious institutes or secular institutes are expressly prohibited from Masonic membership

The 1981 declaration preceded the 1983 Declaration on Masonic Associations issued by the CDF under Joseph Ratzinger as Prefect of the Congregation for the Doctrine of the Faith.
