= Outline of the Catholic ecumenical councils =

Overview of and topical guide to the Catholic ecumenical councils

The following outline is provided as an overview of and topical guide to the Catholic Ecumenical Councils.

An ecumenical council is a conference of ecclesiastical dignitaries and theological experts convened to discuss and settle matters of Church doctrine and practice.

== First Seven Ecumenical Councils ==
- First Council of Nicaea (325 A.D.)
  - Arianism – the belief that the Son of God did not always exist, but was created by—and is therefore distinct from—God the Father. The First Council of Nicaea declared this belief heretical, as did the First Council of Constantinople.
  - Easter date – the date for celebrating Easter was chosen so as not to conflict or be on the same day as the Jewish Passover.
  - Meletius of Lycopolis – bishop of Lycopolis in Egypt. Founder and namesake of the Melitians, who refused to receive in communion those Christians who had renounced their faith during the persecution and later repented of that choice.
  - Nicene Creed – the declaration of the faith of the church
  - Canon Law – body of laws, regulations, or disciplines made or adopted by ecclesiastical authority. 20 were issued by this Council, including several addressing the primacy of Roman, Antiochian, and Alexandrian patriarchs.
- First Council of Constantinople (381 A.D.)
  - Arianism – the belief that the Son of God did not always exist, but was created by—and is therefore distinct from—God the Father. The First Council of Constantinople declared this belief heretical, as did the First Council of Nicaea.
  - Macedonianism – also known as Pneumatomachi; an anti-Nicene Creed sect which flourished in the countries adjacent to the Hellespont during the latter half of the fourth, and the beginning of the fifth century. They denied the divinity of the Holy Ghost, hence the Greek name Pneumatomachi or 'Combators against the Spirit'.
- Council of Ephesus (431 A.D.)
  - Nestorius – teachings included rejection of the long-used title of Theotokos ("Mother of God") for the Virgin Mary, and were understood by many to imply that he did not believe that Christ was truly God. The Council formally condemned him and his followers for heresy.
    - Nestorianism – emphasizes the disunion between the human and divine natures of Jesus.
  - Caelestius – major follower of the Christian teacher Pelagius and the Christian doctrine of Pelagianism, which was opposed to Augustine of Hippo and his doctrine of original sin, and was later declared to be heresy. He and his followers were declared heretics during this council.
  - Nicene Creed – the declaration of the faith of the church - confirmed. Departure from the creed decreed as heretical.
  - excommunication – eviction from the church. This was the punishment decreed at this council for those who did not accept Church doctrine
  - The Virgin Mary – Mary, mother of Jesus. This council decreed she is to be called Theotokos (God-bearer)
- Council of Chalcedon (451 A.D.)
  - Chalcedonian Creed – declares that Jesus Christ is both truly God and truly Man
  - Canon Laws – body of laws, regulations, or disciplines made or adopted by ecclesiastical authority. 27 were issued by this council.
- Second Council of Constantinople (553 A.D.)
  - Three Chapters – three people and their writings – person and writings of Theodore of Mopsuestia, Certain writings of Theodoret of Cyrus, The letter of Ibas of Edessa to Maris – repudiated as Nestorian
- Third Council of Constantinople (680-681 A.D.)
  - Monothelitism – teaches that Jesus Christ had two natures but only one will. This council repudiated this belief.
  - Monoenergism – teaches that Jesus had two natures but only one "energy." This council repudiated this belief.
- Second Council of Nicaea (787 A.D.)
  - Byzantine Iconoclasm – the practice of destroying icons and images. This council repudiated this belief.
  - relics part of the body of a saint or a venerated person, or else another type of ancient religious object, carefully preserved for purposes of veneration or as a tangible memorial. This council decreed that altars must contain a relic.
  - Canon Laws – body of laws, regulations, or disciplines made or adopted by ecclesiastical authority. 22 were issued by this council.

== Other Catholic Ecumenical Councils ==
- Fourth Council of Constantinople (869-870 A.D.)
  - Photius – Ecumenical Patriarch of Constantinople from 858 to 867 and from 877 to 886. He is recognized in the Eastern Orthodox churches as St. Photios the Great. Photios was condemned by this council.
  - Byzantine Iconoclasm – ban on religious images, accompanied by widespread destruction of images and persecution of supporters of the veneration of images. This council reaffirmed the repudiation of this practice by Second Nicene Council.
- First Council of the Lateran (1123 A.D.)
  - Investiture controversy – conflict over two radically different views of whether secular authorities such as kings, counts, or dukes, had any legitimate role in appointments to ecclesiastical offices such as bishops.
  - Burdinus – Gregory VIII (died 1137), born Mauritius Burdinus (Maurice Bourdin), was antipope from 10 March 1118 until 22 April 1121. The First Lateran Council affirmed his excommunication.
  - Concordat of Worms – agreement between Pope Calixtus II and Holy Roman Emperor Henry V on September 23, 1122 near the city of Worms. During the First Lateran Council, decisions of the Concordat of Worms were read and ratified.
  - Simony – act of paying for sacraments and consequently for holy offices or for positions in the hierarchy of a church, named after Simon Magus. The First Lateran Council condemned the practice.
  - Clerical celibacy – requirement that some or all members of the clergy in certain religions be unmarried. Celibacy of the clergy was ordered by Canon Law issued by the First Council of the Lateran.
  - Canon Law – body of laws and regulations made or adopted by ecclesiastical authority. 22 canon laws were issued by the council.
- Second Council of the Lateran (1139 A.D.)
  - Council of Reims – council at which St. Bernard appeared, and the antipope Anacletus was excommunicated. Its decrees affirmed by the Second Council of the Lateran.
  - Council of Clermont – mixed synod of ecclesiastics and laymen of the Catholic Church, which was held from November 18 to November 28, 1095 at Clermont, France. Pope Urban II's speech on November 27 was the starting point of the First Crusade. Its decrees were affirmed by the Second Lateran Council.
  - Canon Laws – body of laws, regulations, or disciplines made or adopted by ecclesiastical authority. The Second Lateran Council issued 30.
- Third Council of the Lateran (1179)
  - Waldensian – Christian movement of the later Middle Ages. They made profession of extreme poverty a prominent feature in their own lives, and emphasized by their practice the need for the much neglected task of preaching. This heresy condemned by the Third Lateran Council.
  - Cathar – Christian religious movement with dualistic and gnostic elements that appeared in the Languedoc region of France and other parts of Europe in the 11th century and flourished in the 12th and 13th centuries. This heresy condemned by the Third Lateran Council.
  - cardinals – senior ecclesiastical official, usually an ordained bishop, and ecclesiastical prince of the Catholic Church. They are collectively known as the College of Cardinals, which as a body elects a new pope. The Third Lateran Council decreed that they only could elect a pope, by at least two-thirds majority.
  - antipopes – person who opposes a legitimately elected or sitting Pope and makes a significantly accepted competing claim to be the Pope. The Third Lateran Council decreed that ordinations made by them are void.
  - usury – practice of charging excessive, unreasonably high, and often illegal interest rates on loans. This council forbade the practice.
  - Canon Laws – body of laws and regulations made or adopted by ecclesiastical authority. This council issued 27.
- Fourth Council of the Lateran (1215)
  - transubstantiation – doctrine that, in the Eucharist, the substance of wheat bread and grape wine changes into the substance of the Body and the Blood of Jesus. The Fourth Council of the Lateran defined this doctrine.
  - Papal primacy – ecclesiastical doctrine concerning the respect and authority that is due to the Bishop of Rome from other bishops and their sees. The Fourth Council of the Lateran declared this doctrine.
  - confession – acknowledgment of sin (or one's sinfulness) or wrongs. The Fourth Council of the Lateran declare that every Christian must perform confession at least once a year.
  - communion – Christian sacrament or ordinance. The Fourth Council of the Lateran declare that every Christian must take communion at least once a year.
  - Papal decrees – particular type of letters patent or charter issued by a Pope of the Catholic Church. The Fourth Council of the Lateran issued 70.
  - Fifth Crusade – attempt to reacquire Jerusalem and the rest of the Holy Land by first conquering the powerful Ayyubid state in Egypt. The Fourth Council of the Lateran organized this effort.
- First Council of Lyon (1245)
  - Frederick II, Holy Roman Emperor – one of the most powerful Holy Roman Emperors of the Middle Ages and head of the House of Hohenstaufen. He was excommunicated and deposed at the First Council of Lyon.
  - Seventh Crusade – crusade led by Louis IX of France from 1248 to 1254. The First Council of Lyons decreed this Crusade.
- Second Council of Lyon (1274)
  - Dominican Order – Roman Catholic religious order founded by Saint Dominic and approved by Pope Honorius III (1216–27) on 22 December 1216 in France. The Second Council of Lyon approved the establishment of this order.
  - Franciscan – Roman Catholic religious orders founded by Saint Francis of Assisi. The Second Council of Lyon approved the establishment of this order.
  - tithe for crusade – The Second Council of Lyon approved the collection of a tithe to fund a crusade.
- Council of Vienne (1311–1312)
  - Knights Templar – among the most famous of the Western Christian military orders. The organization existed for nearly two centuries during the Middle Ages. The Council of Vienne disbanded them at the behest of Philip II of France, who promptly seized their lands, arrested them, and burned many at the stake.
- Council of Constance (1414–1418)
  - Western Schism – also known as the |Three-Popes Controversy, was a split within the Catholic Church from 1378 to 1417. Two men simultaneously claimed to be the true pope. The Council of Constance resolved this problem.
  - Jan Hus – Czech priest, philosopher, reformer, and master at Charles University in Prague. After John Wycliffe, the theorist of ecclesiastical Reformation, Hus is considered the first Church reformer (living prior to Luther, Calvin, and Zwingli). The Council of Constance condemned him and burned him at the stake.
  - Conciliarism – reform movement in the 14th, 15th and 16th century Catholic Church which held that supreme authority in the Church resided with an Ecumenical council, apart from, or even against, the pope. Council of Constance (1414–1418), which succeeded in ending the Great Western Schism, proclaimed its own superiority over the Pope.
- Council of Basel, Ferrara and Florence (1431–1445)
  - Conciliarism – reform movement in the 14th, 15th and 16th century Catholic Church which held that supreme authority in the Church resided with an Ecumenical council, apart from, or even against, the pope. The Council of Florence denied this doctrine, and superiority of the Pope over the Councils was affirmed in the bull Etsi non dubitemus of 20 April 1441.
- Fifth Council of the Lateran (1512–1517)
  - Mount of piety – institutional pawnbroker run as a charity in Europe from the later Middle Ages times to the 20th century. Allowed by the Fifth Council of the Lateran.
  - Immortality of the soul – souls temporarily stay in purgatory to be purified for heaven.
- Council of Trent (1545–1563, with interruptions)
  - Protestantism – one of the major groupings within Christianity. It has been defined as "any of several church denominations denying the universal authority of the Pope and affirming the Reformation principles of justification by faith alone, the priesthood of all believers, and the primacy of the Bible as the only source of revealed truth" and, more broadly, to mean Christianity outside "of a Catholic or Eastern church". This set of beliefs was condemned by the Council of Trent.
  - indulgences – indulgence is the full or partial remission of temporal punishment due for sins which have already been forgiven. The Council of Trent curtailed and restricted how they are issued.
  - sola fide – Protestant doctrine of "faith alone." The Council of Trent rejected this doctrine as "vain confidence."
  - Canon of Trent – confirmed that the deuterocanonical books were on a par with the other books of the canon; ended debate on the Antilegomena; coordinated church tradition with the Scriptures as a rule of faith. It also affirmed Jerome's Latin translation, the Vulgate, to be authoritative for the text of Scripture
  - sacraments – sacred rite recognized as of particular importance and significance; the Council of Trent reaffirmed seven sacraments.
  - purgatory – condition of purification or temporary punishment by which those who die in a state of grace are believed to be made ready for Heaven. The Council of Trent affirmed this doctrine.
- First Council of the Vatican (1870; officially, 1870–1960)
  - Papal supremacy – dogma of the Catholic Church which states that the Pope maintains "supreme, full, immediate, and universal ordinary power" over the Church.
  - Papal infallibility – dogma of the Catholic Church which states that, by action of the Holy Spirit, the Pope is preserved from even the possibility of error when in his official capacity he solemnly declares or promulgates to the universal Church a dogmatic teaching on faith or morals.
  - Dei Filius – teaching of "the holy Catholic Apostolic Roman Church" on God, revelation and faith.
- Second Vatican Council (1962–1965)

Four Constitutions
- Dei verbum – dogmatic constitution on Divine Revelation
- Lumen gentium – dogmatic constitution on the Church
- Gaudium et spes – pastoral constitution on the Church in the Modern World
- Sacrosanctum Concilium – constitution on the sacred liturgy
Nine Decrees
- Ad gentes – decree on Church's missionary activity
- Apostolicam actuositatem – decree on apostolate of the laity
- Christus Dominus – decree on pastoral office of bishops in the church
- Inter mirifica – decree on means of social communication
- Optatam totius – decree on training of priests
- Orientalium Ecclesiarum – decree on the Catholic Oriental Churches
- Perfectae caritatis – decree on up-to-date renewal of religious life
- Presbyterorum ordinis – decree on life and ministry of priests
- Unitatis redintegratio – decree on ecumenism
Three Declarations
- Dignitatis humanae – declaration on religious liberty
- Gravissimum educationis – declaration on Christian education
- Nostra aetate – declaration on Church's relation with non-Christian religions

== See also ==
- Outline of Catholicism
