= Ad gentes =

Second Vatican Council's decree on missionary activity

Second Vatican Ecumenical Council Concilium Oecumenicum Vaticanum Secundum (Latin)
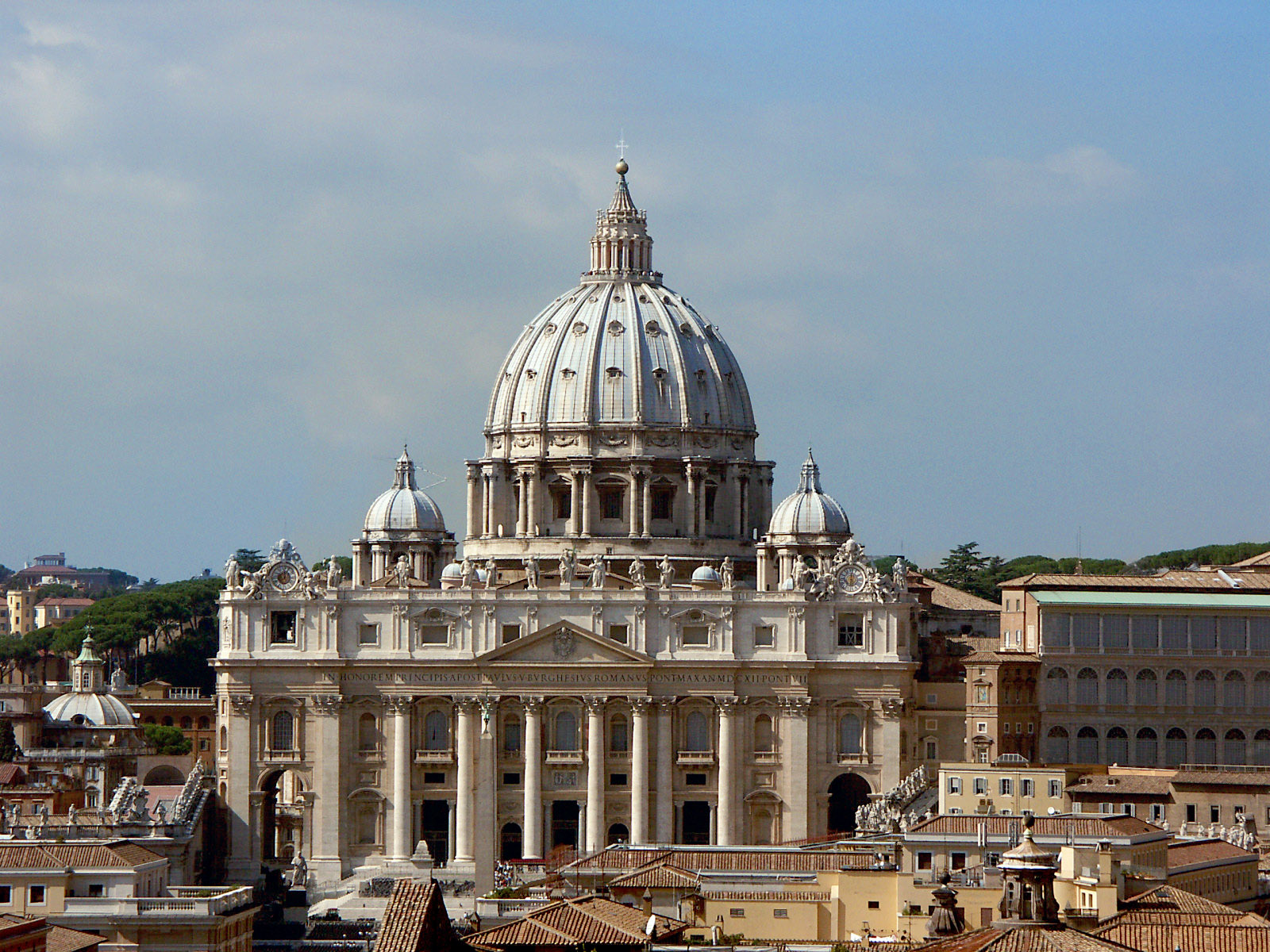
- Saint Peter's Basilica; Venue of the Second Vatican Council
- Date: October 11, 1962 – December 8, 1965
- Accepted by: Catholic Church
- Previous council: First Vatican Council
- Convoked by: Pope John XXIII
- President: Pope John XXIII; Pope Paul VI
- Attendance: up to 2,625
- Topics: The Church in itself, its sole salvific role as the one, true and complete Christian faith, also in relation to ecumenism among other religions, in relation to the modern world, renewal of consecrated life, liturgical disciplines, etc.
- Documents and statements: Four Constitutions: Sacrosanctum Concilium (Constitution on the Sacred Liturgy); Lumen gentium (Dogmatic Constitution on the Church); Dei verbum (Dogmatic Constitution on Divine Revelation); Gaudium et spes (Pastoral Constitution on the Church in the Modern World); Three Declarations: Gravissimum educationis (Declaration on Christian Education); Nostra aetate (Declaration on the Relation of the Church to Non-Christian Religions); Dignitatis humanae (Declaration on Religious Freedom); Nine Decrees: Inter mirifica (Decree on the Media of Social Communication); Orientalium Ecclesiarum (Decree on the Catholic Churches of the Eastern Rite); Unitatis redintegratio (Decree on Ecumenism); Christus Dominus (Decree on the Pastoral Office of Bishops in the Church); Perfectae caritatis (Decree on the Adaptation and Renewal of Religious Life); Optatam totius (Decree on Priestly Training); Apostolicam Actuositatem (Decree on the Apostolate of the Laity); Ad gentes (Decree on the Mission Activity of the Church); Presbyterorum ordinis (Decree on the Ministry and Life of Priests)

Ad gentes (Latin: [ˈad ˈd͡ʒɛn.tes]; lit. 'To the Nations') is the Second Vatican Council's decree on missionary activity that reaffirmed the need for missions and salvation in Christ. The document establishes evangelization as one of the fundamental missions of the Catholic Church and reaffirms the tie between evangelization and charity for the poor. Ad gentes also calls for the formation of strong Christian communities as well as strong relations with other Christians. Finally, it lays out guidelines for the training and actions of the missionaries.

== See also ==
- Catholic charities
- Evangelii gaudium
- Lumen gentium
- Evangelii Nuntiandi
- Redemptoris missio
