= Apostolicam Actuositatem =

Second Vatican Council document on lay Catholic life

Second Vatican Ecumenical Council Concilium Oecumenicum Vaticanum Secundum (Latin)
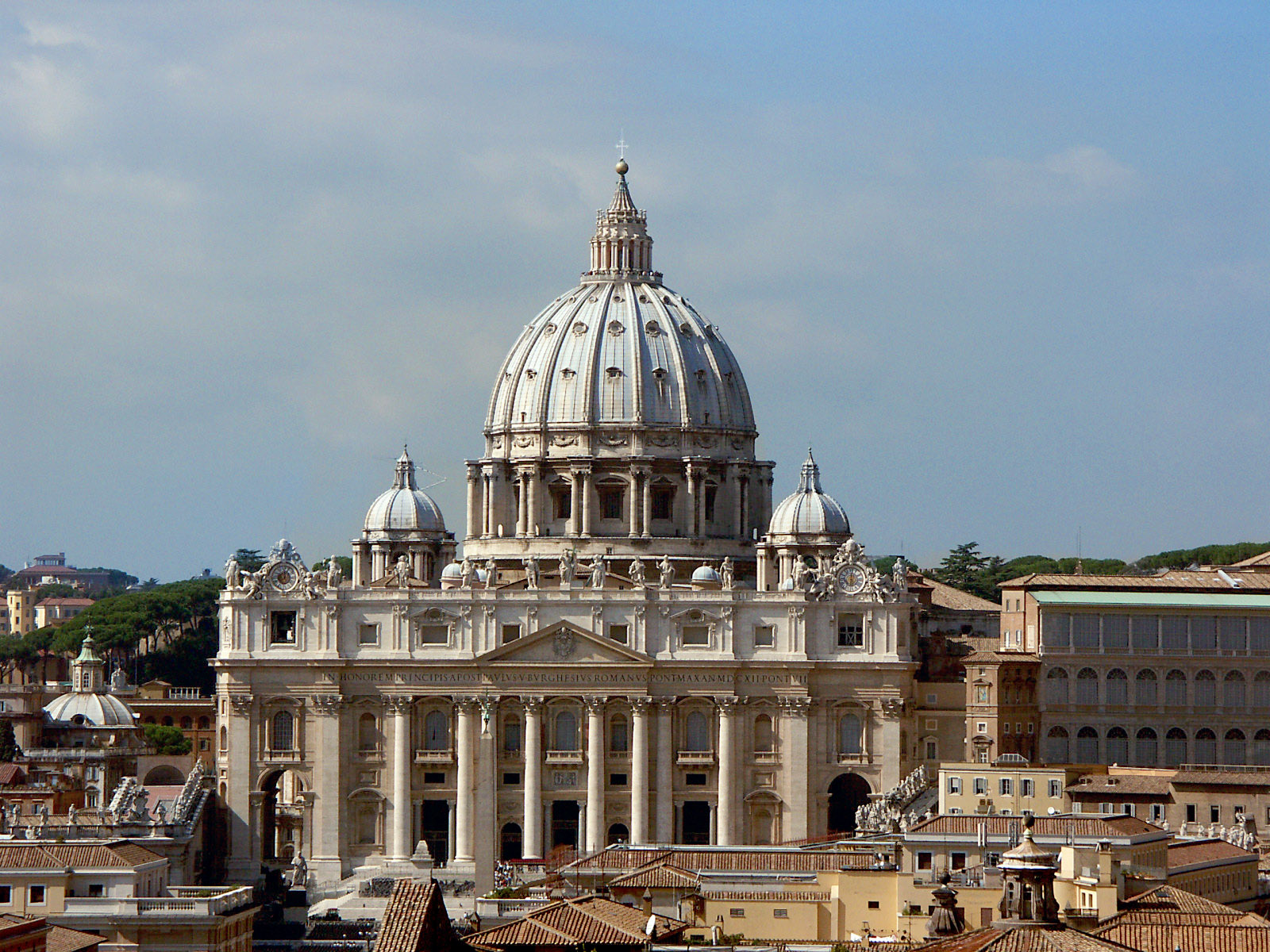
- Saint Peter's Basilica; Venue of the Second Vatican Council
- Date: October 11, 1962 – December 8, 1965
- Accepted by: Catholic Church
- Previous council: First Vatican Council
- Convoked by: Pope John XXIII
- President: Pope John XXIII; Pope Paul VI
- Attendance: up to 2,625
- Topics: The Church in itself, its sole salvific role as the one, true and complete Christian faith, also in relation to ecumenism among other religions, in relation to the modern world, renewal of consecrated life, liturgical disciplines, etc.
- Documents and statements: Four Constitutions: Sacrosanctum Concilium (Constitution on the Sacred Liturgy); Lumen gentium (Dogmatic Constitution on the Church); Dei verbum (Dogmatic Constitution on Divine Revelation); Gaudium et spes (Pastoral Constitution on the Church in the Modern World); Three Declarations: Gravissimum educationis (Declaration on Christian Education); Nostra aetate (Declaration on the Relation of the Church to Non-Christian Religions); Dignitatis humanae (Declaration on Religious Freedom); Nine Decrees: Inter mirifica (Decree on the Media of Social Communication); Orientalium Ecclesiarum (Decree on the Catholic Churches of the Eastern Rite); Unitatis redintegratio (Decree on Ecumenism); Christus Dominus (Decree on the Pastoral Office of Bishops in the Church); Perfectae caritatis (Decree on the Adaptation and Renewal of Religious Life); Optatam totius (Decree on Priestly Training); Apostolicam Actuositatem (Decree on the Apostolate of the Laity); Ad gentes (Decree on the Mission Activity of the Church); Presbyterorum ordinis (Decree on the Ministry and Life of Priests)

Apostolicam Actuositatem (Apostolic Activity), also known as the "Decree on the Apostolate of the Laity", is one of the 16 magisterial documents of the Second Vatican Council. The purpose of the decree was to encourage and guide lay Catholics in their Christian service. In this decree the Council sought "to describe the nature, character, and diversity of the lay apostolate or ministry, to state its basic principles, and to give pastoral directives for its more effective exercise". The spirituality of lay people focusses essentially on union with Christ, and the specific objectives of lay ministry are evangelization and sanctification, renewal of the "temporal order", and charitable works and social aid. The decree quotes Colossians 3:17: "Whatever you do in word or work, do all in the name of the Lord Jesus Christ, giving thanks to God the Father through Him".

== Background ==
Apostolicam Actuositatem follows upon Lumen gentium, the "Dogmatic Constitution on the Church", of 21 November 1964, which discusses the laity, by which the Council fathers mean all the faithful except those in Holy Orders or religious institutes, in chapter IV:

"They live in the ordinary circumstances of family and social life, from which the very web of their existence is woven. ...led by the spirit of the Gospel they may work for the sanctification of the world from within as a leaven. In this way they may make Christ known to others, especially by the testimony of a life resplendent in faith, hope and charity."

It had already been determined that the church's canon law would need to be revised after the Council, and so the decree looked ahead to revised provisions on the lay apostolate emerging in due course.

A preparatory commission began in advance of the Council to develop a "constitution" on the lay apostolate. The draft of this document proved to be too long for full consideration, but after portions were transferred to the draft documents covering the Church itself and the Church in the Modern World, a more viable text emerged which could be debated and agreed by the Council assembly.

The final text was approved on 10 November 1965 by a vote of 2,201 to 2. On 18 November 1965, it was promulgated by Pope Paul VI, after another vote, this time of 2,340 to 2.

== Contents ==
In its introduction, the decree refers to the earliest days of the Church and what it calls "our own times", advising that "no less zeal" (Latin: zelum laicorum) is needed now than was characteristic of the early church.

Two reasons are set out for promoting the role of lay people:

- the breadth, progress and autonomy of modern life, including "fields ... for the most part open to the laity alone", and
- in many places, ... priests are very few [and], in some instances, deprived of due freedom for priestly work"; in these places "the Church could scarcely exist and function without the activity of the laity".

The decree notes that the Council's Decree on Instruments of Social Communication, Decree on Ecumenism, Decree on the Pastoral Duties of Bishops, the Declaration on Christian Education, the Decree on the Missionary Activity of Church and the Decree on Priestly Life and Ministry have already touched in the roles of lay people to some extent.

Chapter 1 covers "the vocation of the laity to the apostolate"; its reference to "faith, hope and charity, which the Holy Spirit diffuses in the hearts of all members of the Church", added at a late stage in the development of the text, recalls the terminology of Lumen gentium. Chapter 2 covers the apostolate's objectives, and chapter 3 concerns "the various fields of the apostolate", listing "church communities, the family, youth, the social milieu, and national and international levels" as "the more important fields" and embracing the active participation of women in the apostolate. Chapter 4 covers individual and collective expressions of the apostolate, and chapter 5 covers "external relationships". Chapter 6 covers "formation for the apostolate" and the document concludes with an "exhortation" calling upon "all the laity in the Lord to answer gladly, nobly, and promptly the more urgent invitation of Christ in this hour and the impulse of the Holy Spirit".

In outlining the objectives of the lay apostolate, the decree makes frequent reference to the renewal of the "temporal order" (ordinis temporalis instaurationem): the term is used 19 times in the decree. Pope John Paul II explains that "there is an order of reality - institutions, values, activities - which we are used to describing as "temporal" insofar as it directly concerns things that belong to the context of the present life, although they are also destined to eternal life".

== Subsequent developments ==
The Pontifical Council for the Laity had its foundation in section 26 of the decree. This body was created in January 1967 by Pope Paul VI's motu proprio Catholicam Christi Ecclesiam. In December 1976, the council was included as a permanent fixture of the Roman Curia. In September 2016, its functions were transferred to the new Dicastery for the Laity, Family and Life.

== See also ==
- Associations of the faithful
- Christifideles laici
- Lay ecclesial ministry
- List of Ecclesial movements
