= Pastoral council =

Catholic consultative body

A pastoral council or pastoral commission is a consultative body within a diocese or parish of the Catholic Church, which serves to advise the bishop or parish priest about pastoral issues. The council's main purpose is to investigate, reflect and reach conclusions about pastoral matters to recommend to the parish priest or bishop as appropriate.

== Origins ==
The concept of the pastoral council was first articulated in the Second Vatican Council's Decree concerning the Pastoral Office of Bishops in the Church (Christus Dominus), issued in 1965. The decree recommended that bishops establish diocesan pastoral councils with a threefold purpose.

Their purpose is to investigate pastoral matters, to ponder or reflect over them, and to reach conclusions that the council can recommend to the bishop. Six official documents of the Church define the diocesan pastoral council in this threefold way:

- Paul VI, "Ecclesiae Sanctae I" (1966) no. 16;
- the 1971 Synod of Bishops' "The Ministerial Priesthood", art. 2, II, section 3;
- the 1973 "Directory on the Pastoral Ministry of Bishops", no. 204;
- the 1973 "Circular Letter on 'Pastoral Councils'" from the Sacred Congregation for the Clergy, no 9;
- the 2002 "Instruction" by the Congregation for the Clergy, "The Priest, Pastoral and Leader" (par 26); and
- the 2004 "Directory" by the Congregation for Bishops, "Apostolorum successores" (par. 184).

In an address to the bishops of Chile, Cardinal Joseph Ratzinger spoke in 1988 of Vatican II as a "pastoral council" with a modest intent, and not as a "rupture with tradition" as described by Marcel Lefebvre.

== Scope ==
Bishops and priests may consult their councils about practical matters. On the diocesan level, this may include "missionary, catechetical and apostolic undertakings within the diocese, concerning the promotion of doctrinal formation and the sacramental life of the faithful; concerning pastoral activities to help the priests in the various social and territorial areas of the diocese; concerning public opinion on matters pertaining to the Church as it is more likely to be fostered in the present time; etc." ("Circular Letter on 'Pastoral Councils,'" (Omnes Christifideles) published in 1973 by the Sacred Congregation for the Clergy, no 9). Council guidelines have different recommendations about the size of the council. The average is 15 members.

== Canon law ==
Canon 511 of the 1983 Code of Canon Law speaks about diocesan pastoral councils: "In each diocese, to the extent that pastoral circumstances recommend it, a pastoral council is to be established whose responsibility it is to investigate under the authority of the bishop all those things which pertain to pastoral works, to ponder them and to propose practical conclusions about them." This reflects the threefold purpose of the pastoral council as first described in the Vatican II Decree on Bishops at paragraph 27.

Canon 536 of the 1983 Code legislates about parish pastoral councils. It states that "§1. If the diocesan bishop judges it opportune after he has heard the presbyteral council, a pastoral council is to be established in each parish, over which the pastor presides and in which the Christian faithful, together with those who share in pastoral care by virtue of their office in the parish, assist in fostering pastoral activity. §2. A pastoral council possesses a consultative vote only and is governed by the norms established by the diocesan bishop."

Consequently, the establishment of parish pastoral councils depends upon the judgment of the diocesan bishop, after having consulted his presbyteral council. If he judges it appropriate, a pastoral council is established in each parish of his diocese.

== More recent documents ==
The purpose of the parish pastoral council, as described in Canon 536, is the "fostering" of "pastoral activity" in the parish. Because the pastor is the proper shepherd of the parish, it follows that his pastoral council possesses a consultative vote only. In fact, the 1997 Instruction on Certain Questions Regarding the Collaboration of the Non-Ordained Faithful in the Sacred Ministry of Priest states that, "It is for the Parish Priest to preside at parochial councils. They are to be considered invalid, and hence null and void, any deliberations entered into, (or decisions taken), by a parochial council which has not been presided over by the Parish Priest or which has assembled contrary to his wishes" (Article 5, § 3).

According to The Priest, Pastor and Leader of the Parish Community, a 2002 Instruction from the Sacred Congregation for the Clergy, "The basic task of such a council is to serve, at institutional level, the orderly collaboration of the faithful in the development of pastoral activity which is proper to priests. The pastoral council is thus a consultative organ in which the faithful, expressing their baptismal responsibility, can assist the parish priest, who presides at the council, by offering their advice on pastoral matters. The lay faithful ought to be ever more convinced of the special meaning that their commitment to the apostolate takes on in their parish; hence it is necessary to have a more convinced, extensive and decided appreciation for 'Parish Pastoral Councils'. There are clear reasons for such: In the present circumstances the lay faithful have the ability to do very much and, therefore, ought to do very much towards the growth of an authentic ecclesial communion in their parishes in order to reawaken missionary zeal towards nonbelievers and believers themselves who have abandoned the faith or grown lax in the Christian life".

"All of the faithful have the right, sometimes even the duty, to make their opinions known on matters concerning the good of the Church. This can happen through institutions which have been established to facilitate that purpose: [...]the pastoral council can be a most useful aid...providing proposals and suggestions on missionary, catechetical and apostolic initiatives [..] as well as on the promotion of doctrinal formation and the sacramental life of the faithful; on the assistance to be given to the pastoral work of priests in various social and territorial situations; on how better to influence public opinion etc. The pastoral council is to be seen in relation to the context of the relationship of mutual service that exists between a parish priest and his faithful. It would therefore be senseless to consider the pastoral council as an organ replacing the parish priest in his government of the parish, or as one which, on the basis of a majority vote, materially constrains the parish priest in his direction of the parish."

=== Development into pastoral councils ===
In 1983, the revised Code of Canon Law was published. It did not refer to par. 26 of the Decree on the Laity, nor did it speak of "apostolic" councils or "parish councils" per se. Instead, in canon 536, it recommended (but did not mandate) "pastoral" councils at the parish level [see the article on "pastoral" councils].

The idea of the "pastoral" council had its genesis in the 1965 Vatican II Decree on Bishops (Christus Dominus, par. 27). This decree recommended "pastoral" councils at the diocesan level (but not at the parish level). Canon 536 applied the "pastoral" council idea to parishes. The "pastoral" council (according to the decree) has a threefold purpose. It (1) investigates pastoral matters, (2) ponders or reflects on them, and (3) reaches conclusions, conclusions that are recommended to the pastor. When the new Code was promulgated, it clarified the identity of what had hitherto been called the "parish" councils. These councils were now "parish pastoral" councils with a "consultative only" vote.

=== Threefold purpose ===
Canon 536 (which recommends parish pastoral councils) defines the purpose of councils in an extremely brief way. It says that they "give their help in fostering parish activity". Canon 536 does not mention the threefold task of the pastoral council – the task of investigating, reflecting, and reaching conclusions – but canon 511 does (in a reference to diocesan pastoral councils).

Four other Vatican documents define the "pastoral" councils in terms of this threefold task (Paul VI, "Ecclesiae Sanctae I," no. 16; the 1971 Synod of Bishops' "The Ministerial Priesthood," art 2, II, section 3; the 1973 "Directory on the Pastoral Ministry of Bishops," no. 204; and the 1973 "Circular Letter on 'Pastoral Councils'" by the Sacred Congregation for the Clergy, no 9). Those who read canon 536 without referring to these other Vatican documents that speak of the "pastoral" council may not realize that investigating, pondering, and reaching conclusions is precisely what defines the pastoral council.

=== Confusion with "pastoral" councils ===
Parish councils are sometimes mistakenly distinguished from parish pastoral councils, as if the two were separate parish entities. The first parish councils were, properly speaking, "apostolate" councils of the type recommended in the Decree on Laity, par. 26. When the Code of Canon Law was revised, it did not refer to apostolate councils, but called for pastoral councils.

Those who do not know about the development of the "pastoral" council idea in the Vatican documents of 1971, 1973, and 1984 may mistakenly believe that the "parish" councils that emerged immediately after Vatican II are separate from pastoral councils. They may wrongly suppose that "parish" councils are bureaucratically structured decision-making bodies, independent of the pastor, that oversee such parish matters as the annual plan, schedule and budget, capital improvements, and the like. But councils do not make decisions independently of the pastor and have a consultative vote only.

== United States ==
In American Roman Catholic parishes, the parish council arose after Vatican II in the new era of lay participation in parish decision-making. It was a response to the Vatican II Decree on the Apostolate of Lay People (Apostolicam actuositatem, par. 26). This decree, published in 1965, recommended the establishment of councils at all levels of the Catholic Church (including the parish) with one purpose, namely, to assist in the Church's "apostolate" or mission. The decree also said that such apostolic councils "may coordinate" lay initiatives, so long as they do not interfere with the autonomy of such initiatives. Many Catholics throughout the world interpreted the decree as calling for parish councils that would coordinate parish committees or commissions. This was the genesis of the "parish council".

A 2003 survey by the U.S. Conference of Catholic Bishops found that half of U.S. dioceses and three-quarters of U.S. parishes had councils.

== See also ==
- Parochial church council
