= Vocations in the Catholic Church =

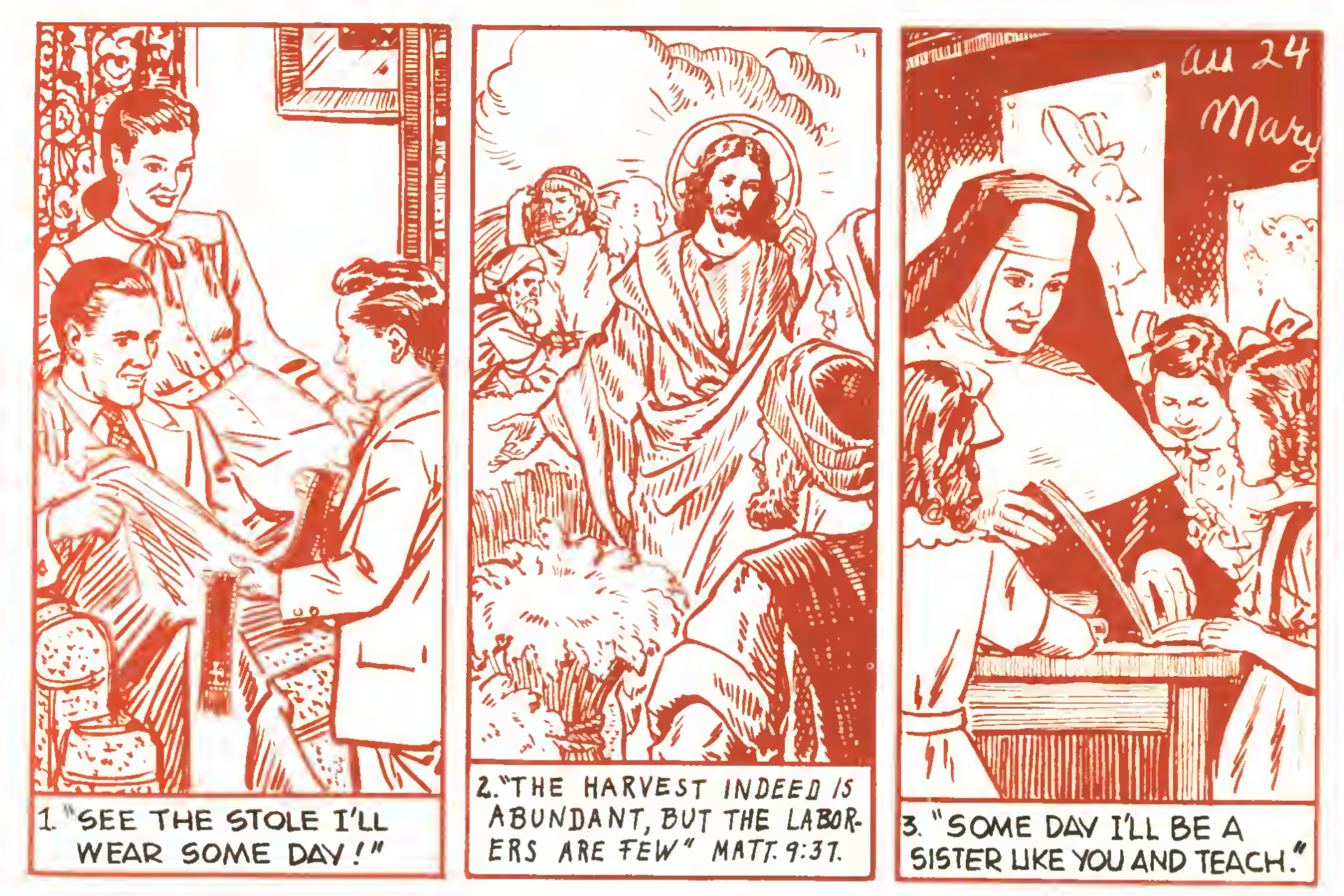
An illustration from a children's catechism shows a boy and a girl discerning vocations to the religious life, encouraging young readers to consider such a possibility for themselves

In Catholic church life, vocation is understood as hearing or feeling an inner voice or a strong feeling that moves one towards a specific life task. This is referred to as a calling to love and to life (in its fullness), which is deeply rooted in the heart of every individual. A person can be either called to the consecrated life, to the priesthood, the life as a permanent deacon or to live in the world, either married or single. The commitment to act as a missionary is also described as a vocation.

Vocational discernment is the process by which men and women in the Catholic Church discern, or recognize, their vocation in the church and the world.

== Fostering vocations ==
The Second Vatican Council asserted that "the duty of fostering vocations pertains to the whole Christian community, which should exercise it above all by a fully Christian life". Two approaches to the promotion of vocations are combined in the Council's Decree on Priestly Training: the "traditional means" of prayer for vocations, catechesis and Christian penance, alongside "methodically and coherently planned" work to secure the same goal.

== Discernment processes ==
Each diocese, religious institute, or monastery usually has its own guidelines and advice for men or women discerning religious vocations. Many dioceses and religious institutes encourage men and women with potential vocations to spend time, usually anywhere from six months to a year, praying and asking God to enlighten them. Those who feel they might be called to a religious vocation are encouraged to seek a spiritual director to help them along the way. After the set time, many institutes have a formal discernment process which the candidate will engage in, before entering the institute as a novice, or the seminary.

== Men ==
For men there are a number of vocations in the Catholic Church. The best known is the vocation to the priesthood, as either a diocesan or a religious priest. A diocesan priest serves in a particular diocese and is under the local bishop. A religious priest (in this sense) is a member of a specific religious institute such as the Trinitarians, Holy Cross Fathers and Brothers, Augustinians or Jesuits. Diocesan and religious priests may also serve for a time in specific apostolates such as military chaplains or the maritime apostolate.

In addition, men may be called to religious life as a friar, monk, or a religious brother. Friars are members of mendicant orders, such the Order of Friars Minor or Augustinians. Monks are usually members of cloistered communities. Friars, monks, and religious Brothers all take vows of poverty, chastity, and obedience, but do not receive priestly ordination. Members of societies of apostolic life, without taking religious vows, emphasize apostolic service and are fully active in society.

Other vocations for men in the Catholic Church include those to being permanent deacon, hermits, and members a secular institute. It is possible for someone to experience a combination of vocations. Thomas Merton became a Trappist, was ordained a priest, and lived for a time in a hermitage on the monastery grounds.

== Women ==
For women, vocational discernment would consist of feeling called to marriage, the consecrated life as life a nun, a religious sister, a consecrated virgin a member of a secular institute or a diocesan hermit. The life of religious sisters is similar to that of religious brothers. Nuns, in the strict sense of the word, correspond to monks and live in papal enclosure.

== Vocation to marriage ==
Traditionally the term vocation was used in the Catholic Church only to refer to priestly or religious vocations, the vocation to live a life directly consecrated to God. Thomas Aquinas, e.g., only explicitly uses the term vocation to refer to vocation to grace or conversion, or to enter religious life, though it has been argued that his teaching may be logically extended to include marriage as a vocation. In the 20th century there has been a growing movement to extend the use of the term widely. The Second Vatican Council taught that all Christians, whatever their state, are called "to the fullness of the Christian life and to the perfection of charity". The conclusion drawn from this principle is that any way of life that can be a full expression of Christian charity, and a means for growing towards the perfection of it, can be a vocation. Pope John Paul II taught that "there are two specific ways of realizing the vocation of the human person, in its entirety, to love: marriage and virginity or celibacy".

== See also ==
- Catholic religious order
- Institute of consecrated life
- Secular clergy
- Universal call to holiness
- Vocations Sunday
