= Religious (Western Christianity) =

Member of a religious order

A religious (using the word as a noun) is, in the terminology of many Western Christian denominations, such as the Catholic Church, Lutheran churches, and Anglican Communion, what in common language one would call a "monk" or "nun".

More precisely, a religious is a member of a religious order or religious institute, someone who belongs to "a society in which members [...] pronounce public vows [...] and lead a life of brothers or sisters in common". A religious may also be ordained into the clergy, but ordination does not in itself define someone as a religious.

Some classes of religious have also been referred to, though less commonly now than in the past, as "regulars", because of living in accordance with a religious rule (regula in Latin) such as the Rule of Saint Benedict.

== Catholicism ==
The evangelical purpose of religious life is set out in the Second Vatican Council's Dogmatic Constitution on the Church:

Religious should carefully keep before their minds the fact that the Church presents Christ to believers and non-believers alike in a striking manner daily through them. The Church thus portrays Christ in contemplation on the mountain, in His proclamation of the kingdom of God to the multitudes, in His healing of the sick and maimed, in His work of converting sinners to a better life, in His solicitude for youth and His goodness to all men, always obedient to the will of the Father who sent Him.

The Council went on in its Decree on the Adaptation and Renewal of Religious Life to "treat of the life and discipline of those institutes whose members make profession of chastity, poverty and obedience and to provide for their needs in our time", while in its Decree on the Ministry and Life of Priests, the Council also reminded the Catholic clergy that "all religious, both men and women, who certainly have a distinguished place in the house of the Lord, deserve special care in their spiritual progress for the good of the whole Church".

=== Catholic canon law ===
The 1983 Code of Canon Law devotes 103 canons to religious, arranged in eight chapters:

1. Religious houses and their erection and suppression
2. The governance of institutes
3. The admission of candidates and the formation of members
4. The obligations and rights of institutes and their members
5. The apostolate of institutes
6. Separation of members from the institute
7. Religious raised to the episcopate
8. Conferences of major superiors

The code defines "Religious" as members of religious institutes, societies in which the members take public vows and live a fraternal life in common. Thus monks such as Benedictines and Carthusians, nuns such as Carmelites and Poor Clares, and friars such as Dominicans and Franciscans are called religious.

=== Clerical or lay ===
If a religious has been ordained as a deacon, a priest or a bishop, he also belongs to the clergy and so is a member of what is called the "religious clergy" or the "regular clergy". Clergy who are not members of a religious institute are known as secular clergy. They generally serve a geographically defined diocese or a diocese-like jurisdiction such as an apostolic vicariate or personal ordinariate, and so are also referred to as diocesan clergy.

A religious who has not been ordained is a member of the laity (a lay person), not of the clergy.

Once any non-ordained religious professes vows, especially final vows, they must be formally dispensed from those vows in order for them to no longer apply. This is a lengthy and formal process, with set procedures, that involves their local superior, the local Bishop or other Ordinary, the head of the Order, and the Vatican's Congregation for Religious.

If they are ordained, they must also be formally suspended from and then relieved of their duties, and then laicized (formally removed from the clerical state), which is a related but separate matter. Both laicization and dispensation of vows are only done for serious reasons, which includes if one seeks to get married. The process is even more complex if they are accused of a secular or ecclesiastical offense or crime (some procedures can be expedited in certain criminal cases involving sexual abuse).

While the state of consecrated life is neither clerical or lay, institutes themselves are classified as one or the other. A clerical institute is one that "by reason of the purpose or design intended by the founder or by virtue of legitimate tradition, is under the direction of clerics, assumes the exercise of sacred orders, and is recognized as such by the authority of the Church". In clerical institutes, such as the Dominican Order or the Jesuits, most of the members are clerics. In only a few cases do lay institutes have some clergy among their members.

== Lutheranism ==
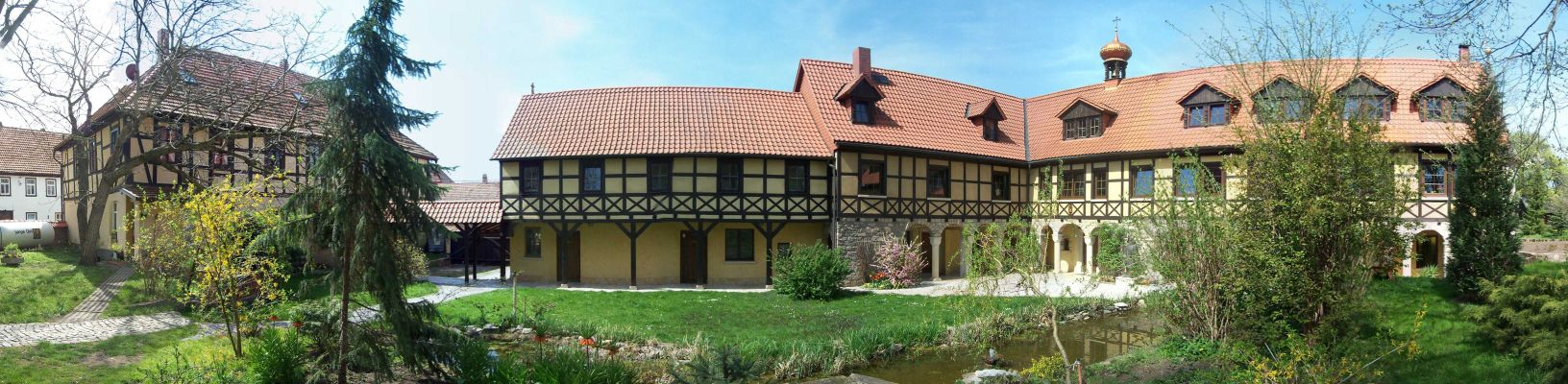
The Priory of St. Wigbert is a Lutheran monastery in the Benedictine tradition

In the Lutheran churches, religious are defined as those who make religious vows before their bishop to live consecrated life, especially in a religious order. An ordained priest who is not a part of a Lutheran religious order is considered 'secular', rather than 'religious'.

== Anglicanism ==
In the Anglican Communion, the religious are those who have taken "vows of poverty, chastity, and obedience, usually in community".

== See also ==
- Consecrated life
- Institute of consecrated life
- Religious institute
- Religious congregation
- Secular institute
- Society of apostolic life
