= Seminary =

Theology education institution

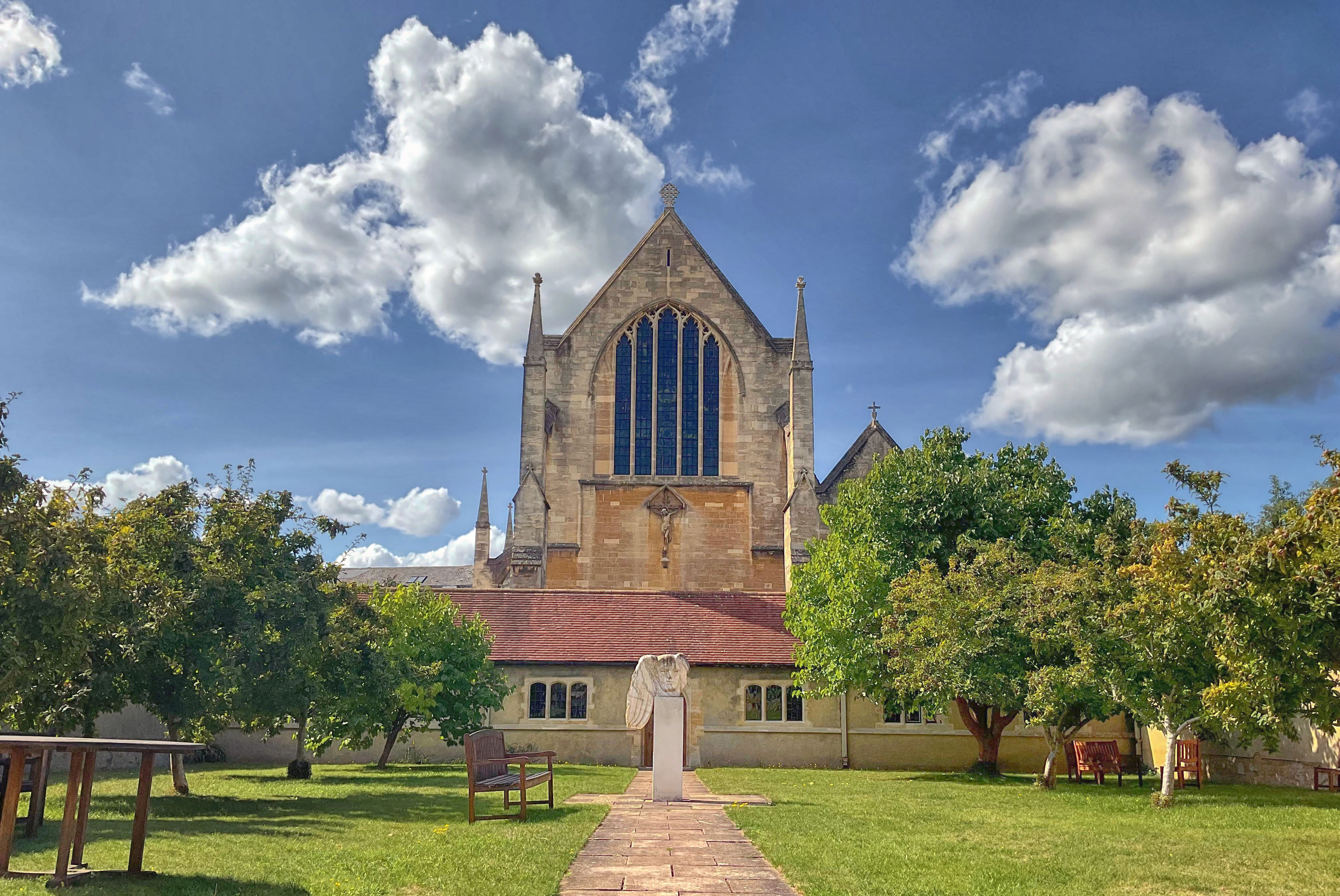
St Stephen's House, Oxford

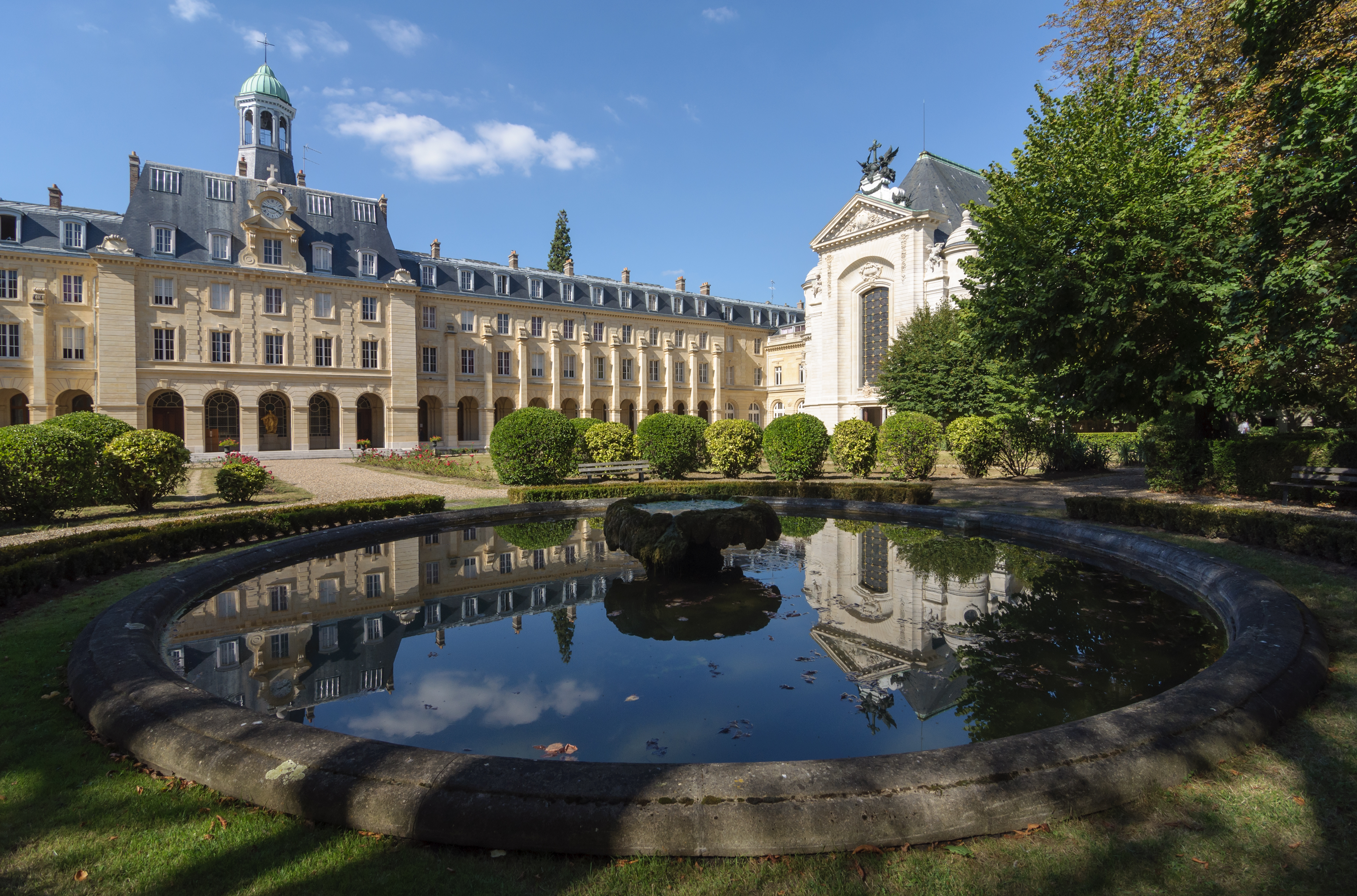
Saint-Sulpice Seminary, in Issy-les-Moulineaux, France

A seminary, school of theology, theological college, or divinity school is an educational institution for educating students (sometimes called seminarians) in scripture and theology, generally to prepare them for ordination to serve as clergy or otherwise in Christian ministry, or in an academic career. A seminary is typically a standalone institution focused more broadly on ministerial or professional training whereas a divinity school is often embedded within a larger school and can be more academically and research focused, although the labels can be used quite flexibly.

The establishment of seminaries in modern times resulted from the Catholic reforms of the Counter-Reformation instituted by the Council of Trent. These Tridentine seminaries placed great emphasis on spiritual formation and personal discipline as well as the study, first of philosophy as a base, and, then, as the final crown, theology.

== Terminology ==
The English word is taken from Latin: seminarium, translated as 'seed-bed', an image taken from a Council of Trent document, Cum adolescentium aetas, 'Since the age of adolescence', which called for the first modern seminaries.

Students within seminaries are referred to as seminarians.

In the Catholic Church, the term "minor seminary" refers to a place where education and formation is offered to young men of high school age, while the term "major seminary" is used for post-school age ministerial formation. In the United States, the term is currently used for graduate-level theological institutions, but historically it was used for high schools.

In the United States, Protestant institutions also widely adopted the term 'seminary' for independent graduate schools (separate from a university) to train their ministers. The oldest such Protestant seminary in the United States was founded in Andover, Massachusetts, in 1807 as the Andover Theological Seminary and was affiliated with the Congregationalist Church. After two mergers and a number of relocations, Andover is now part of the Yale Divinity School, in New Haven, Connecticut.

In some countries, the term "seminary" is also used for secular schools of higher education that train teachers: for example, many female seminaries were established in the United States in the nineteenth century.

== Catholicism ==
The Second Vatican Council (1963-65) issued a Decree on Priestly Training on 28 October 1965, which focussed particularly on the role of the seminary in the formation of a Catholic priest. The decree outlined an updated role for minor seminaries and stressed the importance of major seminaries as essential for priestly formation, further observing that:

The discipline of seminary life is to be reckoned ... as a necessary part of the total whole training formation.

Following the Council, general guidelines for seminary formation were set out in the governing document as of 2016, Ratio Fundamentalis Institutionis Sacerdotalis, 1992's Pastores dabo vobis, and in the Code of Canon Law. Seminaries are overseen by regional conferences of bishops. In the United States, the governing document is Program of Priestly Formation: in the United States of America (6th Ed.), published by the United States Conference of Catholic Bishops in 2022.

Seminaries in the Catholic Church include both minor seminaries for teenagers and major seminaries for adults, including both college seminaries, sometimes also known as minor seminaries, for undergraduate students and post-graduate seminaries for those who already have a bachelor's degree. There are also seminaries for older adults who consider becoming priests in later life, such as the Sacred Heart Seminary and School of Theology in Wisconsin and the Beda College in Rome, and for other more specialized purposes.

The Council also introduced the idea of "international seminaries" where priests could be trained who were destined for incardination into missionary dioceses where numbers of priests were too low to meet pastoral needs. The Priestly Fraternity of Saint Peter's seminary in Wigratzbad, Germany, describes itself as "international".

Recognising that not every seminarian will progress to ordination, the Council Fathers declared that "at an early date, [and] guided in a fatherly way", students who are not considered suitable for ordination should be guided towards other options, "be[ing] given sufficient direction so that, conscious of their vocation as Christians, they might eagerly embrace the lay apostolate".

All seminaries are run either by religious orders and societies or by dioceses or other similar structures. Often a seminary will train both that particular order's or diocese's priests and the priests of other orders or dioceses that select that particular seminary for its priests. For instance, Saint John's Seminary in Boston, Massachusetts, trains priests for many of the other dioceses in New England which are suffragan dioceses of the Archdiocese of Boston. Either way, a man who seeks to enter a seminary to become a priest must be sponsored either by a diocese or by a religious order.

Often a diocese might be attached to or affiliated with a larger Catholic college or university so that the larger college and its faculty provides more general education in history or theology while the seminary focuses on topics specific to the needs of future priests, such as training in canon law, the sacraments, and preaching, or specific to the particular order or diocese. For instance the Theological College in Washington, D.C., is part of The Catholic University of America.

There are several seminaries in Rome which educate seminarians or already ordained priests and bishops and which are maintained by orders or dioceses from outside of Italy. Many countries have their own pontifical seminary in Italy, usually very close to the Vatican. For instance, the Pontifical North American College, which trains priests from the United States and elsewhere, is supported by the United States Conference of Catholic Bishops. These colleges usually award degrees to seminarians and priests pursuing further education and specializing in specific fields such as Scripture, hagiography, moral theology, or Canon Law, among countless others. In addition to civil degrees, these pontifical seminaries confer ecclesiastical degrees (Baccalaureate of Sacred Theology, Licentiate of Sacred Theology, and Doctorate of Sacred Theology), which are backed by the Holy See. Only some Catholic universities may bestow these degrees; these are called ecclesiastical or pontifical universities. The only pontifical seminary outside of Italy is the Pontifical College Josephinum, in Columbus, Ohio.

As outlined by the Ratio, Catholic seminary formation is composed of four major components, or dimensions: human, spiritual, intellectual and pastoral. The human dimension focuses on the seminarian's ability to relate to others, show etiquette, and care for himself (in what he eats, frequency of exercise, healthcare, etc.). The spiritual dimension aids the seminarian in becoming more responsive to God and forming a habit of prayer throughout the day. It also emphasizes the importance of the sacraments and liturgy. The intellectual dimension consists of academic classes, usually beginning with a college degree, usually a Bachelor of Arts or a Bachelor of Philosophy, and terminating in a higher degree, such as a Master of Arts in Theology or a Master of Divinity. The pastoral dimension helps to develop pastoral familiarity with situations such as bedside manner, marriage, and life in the parish.

For Catholic seminarians, seminary formation can be divided into four distinct stages of formation.

1. Propaedeutic Stage: the seminarian primarily grows in prayer and his relationship with God, study of Scripture, and Church teaching. He also significantly grows in the human dimension. This stage lasts from 12 months to three years and can be compared in many ways to a postulant in religious life.
2. Discipleship Stage: the seminarian begins his academic studies and continues to follow Christ as a disciple. If he entered out of high school, he usually pursues the Bachelor of Arts, which takes four years. If he did some college, he pursues the same degree, but it may take less time. If he already achieved a college degree, he pursues a two-year Bachelor of Philosophy.
3. Configuration Stage: the seminarian becomes configured to Christ. At this point, he has a regular habit of prayer. Focus in formation becomes more and more pastoral, as he gets closer to ordination. At the beginning of this stage, he receives candidacy (similar to Tonsure), which means he is expected to eventually be ordained. The seminarian may (depending on his region) begin wearing clerical attire. This stage usually lasts three to four years and ends in a master's degree.
4. Vocational Synthesis Stage: the seminarian is ordained. He becomes a deacon and transitions into parish life for a period of at least six months. He becomes a priest thereafter, usually becoming a parochial vicar or curate before becoming a pastor or parish priest.

The oldest Catholic seminary in the United States is St. Mary's Seminary and University in Baltimore founded in 1791.

== Protestant practice ==
The International Council for Evangelical Theological Education was founded in 1980 by the Theological Commission of the World Evangelical Alliance. In 2015, it would have 1,000 member schools in 113 countries. In the United States and Canada, the Association of Theological Schools is a non-governmental accreditation agency and body of seminaries in North America. The M.Div is considered the standard degree offered by Protestant seminaries for broad pastoral training. Many seminaries offer other programs including master's of arts, master's of theological studies (M.T.S.), Th.M (a master's degree completed after a first master's degree often en route to or in place of a doctorate), Doctor of Ministry (D.Min) focused on the professional practice of ministry, Ph.D programs and others. Asides from the traditional fields of ministry, theology and biblical studies, many seminaries operate programs in counseling (nouthetic and psychology-integrated), Christian education and missiology/intercultural studies Some seminaries also operate undergraduate Bible college programs or are embedded as part of a larger university. Many non-seminary institution also offer similar graduate programs.

In the United States, protestant seminary education was typically dominated by Midwestern institutions such as the now defunct Trinity Evangelical Divinity School, but due to higher education shifts in the 2010s and 2020s southern institutions now dominate the landscape. The Southern Baptist Convention operates several of the world's largest seminaries including Midwestern Baptist, Southern, Southeastern and others. Other major seminaries not affiliated with a particular denomination include Dallas Theological Seminary, Asbury Theological Seminary, Rawlings School of Divinity (Liberty University), Talbot School of Theology (Biola University) and Gordon-Conwell Theological Seminary. Notable mainline and non-evangelical seminaries include Duke Divinity School (United Methodist), Princeton Theological Seminary, Harvard Divinity School, Yale Divinity School and George Truett Seminary (Baylor University).

== Latter-day Saints ==
The Church of Jesus Christ of Latter-day Saints (LDS Church) hosts seminary classes for high school students ages 14 to 18, as part of the Church Educational System. Unlike use in other religious contexts, the word "seminary", in an LDS Church context, does not refer to a higher education program designed to train students for a church-based career. It does, however, help prepare them for spiritual service within the church (such as LDS missions and other callings). LDS seminary students do not earn high school credit for their seminary studies.

== Jewish usage ==
In Jewish usage, Yeshivas, and especially Midrashas for women, are widely referred to as "seminaries".

== Pagan and nature-based contexts ==
Serving the Neopagan tradition, Cherry Hill Seminary in Columbia, South Carolina, offers online graduate degrees in Master of Divinity and Masters of Pagan Studies, focusing on Pagan chaplaincy, theology, and religious history. Unlike many Christian seminaries, this tradition do not ordain ministers.

== See also ==
- Consecrated life
- Bible college
- List of Eastern Catholic seminaries
- List of evangelical seminaries and theological colleges
- List of Roman Catholic seminaries
- Minor seminary
- Female seminary
- Madrasa in Islam
- Buddhist higher education: Buddhist universities and colleges in the United States
- List of Islamic seminaries
