= Presbyterorum Ordinis =

Catholic Decree

Presbyterorum ordinis, subtitled the "Decree on the Ministry and Life of Priests", is one of the documents produced by the Second Vatican Council. On 7 December 1965, the document was promulgated by Pope Paul VI, immediately after an approval vote of 2,390 to 4 among the assembled bishops. The title means "Order of Priests" in Latin. As is customary for such documents in the Catholic Church, it is taken from the first line of the decree (its incipit).

== History ==
Agitation among the Council Fathers for a separate and distinct conciliar decree on the priesthood began during the second session of the council (1963), in the course of the discussions about the drafts concerning the Dogmatic Constitution on the Church (Lumen gentium). Initially and in response to this call, a document was produced called Propositiones de Vita et Ministerio Sacerdotali ("Propositions on the Life and Ministry of Priests") or "Message to All Priests of the World", which were debated during October 1964. Cardinal Herranz later referred to them as "brief and therefore necessarily poor and insufficient", and they were rejected by the Council in favour of developing more comprehensive schema.

== Contents ==
The decree opens with a reference to the Council's other documents which had already touched on the importance of the priestly ministry in the Catholic Church, (Note: Footnote 1 refers to the Constitution on the Sacred Liturgy (1963), the Dogmatic Constitution on the Church (1964), and the decrees on the pastoral duties of bishops and on priestly training (both published shortly before Presbyterorum Ordinis).) before setting out its own purpose, "to treat of the subject of priests at greater length and with more depth". Its key questions are "What is a priest?" and "What is the priesthood?". The decree makes clear that priests, to "a lesser degree" than bishops, share in the ministry which Jesus Christ entrusted to his apostles and their successors.

The decree is concerned with "all priests" in the Catholic Church, but it needs to be read "with suitable adaptations being made for priests who are religious".

Its three chapters address in turn:

- "the priesthood in the ministry of the Church"
- "the ministry of priests", with sections concerned with their functions, relationships, and distribution
- "the life of priests": their striving for perfection and the assistance they can be given towards this aim.

In its conclusion, "the difficulties which priests experience in the circumstances of contemporary life" are highlighted: estrangement from the world, the challenge of formulating the gospel message in understandable ways, "the seeming unproductivity of work done, and also the bitter loneliness which men experience". Against this background, however, the Council fathers seek to encourage the priests of the church to take courage and to keep faith.

== Reception ==
Presbyterorum ordinis has come to be one of the defining documents on the role and duties of the priesthood in the modern era. According to Cardinal Jose Sanchez, alongside its applicability to the circumstances of its time, it should retain its validity in future and "in the light of new questions and challenges".

Bishop Fabian Bruskewitz links the document with several later church documents: Sacerdotalis Caelibatus, an encyclical letter on priestly celibacy written in 1967 by Pope Paul VI, documents from the synods of bishops in 1971 and 1990, Pope John Paul II's apostolic exhortation Pastores Dabo Vobis ("I Will Give You Shepherds") of 1992, and the Directory on the Ministry and Life of Priest published in 1994.

The period that followed the promulgation of Presbyterorum ordinis was marked by a severe drop in the number of priestly vocations in the Western World. Church leaders argued age-old secularization was to blame and that it was not directly related to the documents of the council. Historians also pointed to the damage caused in 1968, by the sexual revolution, and the strong backlash over Humanae vitae. Yet, other authors asserted the drop in vocations was at least partly deliberate as part of an attempt to de-clericalize the Catholic Church and allow for a more pluralistic clergy. In 1995, according to the Congregation for the Clergy, in recent years, "despite various persistent difficulties, there is a positive quantitative and qualitative recovery which makes one hope for a priestly second spring".

There was a related exodus from the priesthood, which began under Paul VI and continued during the papacy of John Paul II. In 2007, "La Civilta Cattolica" reported 69,063 priests left the ministry between 1964 and 2004; 11,213 later returned.

In November 2015 Pope Francis addressed a conference sponsored by the Congregation for the Clergy marking the fiftieth anniversary of the proclamation of the Vatican II decree. He told delegates attending the conference,

The good that priests can do comes primarily from their proximity to – and a tender love for – their people. They are not philanthropists or functionaries, but fathers and brothers. ... Even priests have a biography, and are not 'mushrooms' which sprout up suddenly at the Cathedral on their day of ordination.

The publication and legacy of both Presbyterorum ordinis and Optatam Totius was recalled by Pope Leo XIV in an 2025 apostolic letter commemorating the sixtieth anniversaries of both documents.

== See also ==
- Optatam totius
- Pastores dabo vobis
