= Pastores dabo vobis =

1992 apostolic exhortation by Pope John Paul II

Pastores dabo vobis Latin for 'I Shall Give You Shepherds' Apostolic exhortation of Pope John Paul II
- Signature date: 25 March 1992
- Number: 7 of 15 of the pontificate
- Text: In Latin; In English

Pastores dabo vobis (I shall give you shepherds) is an apostolic exhortation released on March 25, 1992, by Pope John Paul II. It concerns the formation of priests and is addressed to both clergy and the lay faithful of the Catholic Church.

The exhortation emphasizes human formation as the basis of all priestly formation.

== See also ==
- Vita consecrata
