= Formation in the Catholic Church =

Catholic religious training

Formation is a term used in the Catholic Church to cover various forms of training and preparation for service and participation in the life of the church.

In relation to ordained clergy, formation is concerned with the personal preparation that the Church offers to candidates for ordination: "priestly formation is necessary for all priests, diocesan and religious and of every rite". The same term is used in relation to deacons. For members of a religious order such as the Society of Jesus, such formation involves a program of spiritual and academic training for life within the order. In the case of priestly formation, the typical location concerned is the seminary either operated by a diocese for the purposes of training diocesan/secular clergy or operated by a religious order for the purpose of preparing its members for priestly ordination.

In other contexts, church documents refer to:

- liturgical formation: "the necessity for ongoing liturgical catechesis of all members of the assembly is self-evident".
- lay formation: "the [lay] apostolate can attain its maximum effectiveness only through a diversified and thorough formation".
- the continuing formation of priests after their ordination.
- formation in synodality: "the holy People of God require proper formation so that they can witness to the joy of the Gospel and grow in the practice of synodality".

== See also ==
- Acculturation
- Discipleship
- Formation of conscience
- Jesuit formation
- Moral development
- Socialization
- Spiritual development
