= Gravissimum educationis =

1965 Catholic declaration on education

The Catholic Church's document Gravissimum educationis is the Second Vatican Council's Declaration on Christian Education. It was promulgated on 28 October 1965 by Pope Paul VI, following approval by the assembled bishops by a vote of 2,290 to 35. The declaration is concerned with "education" in itself, including adult education, and specifically with "Christian education", although it is often seen as focusing primarily on education in schools.

To revitalize its teaching, updating it to today's challenges, Pope Francis created the Gravissimum Educationis Foundation – Culture for Education in 2015.

== Description ==
The document is generally referred to by the opening words of its original Latin text, which refer to "how extremely important education is in the life of man".

The document quotes at length from Divini illius Magistri (That divine teacher), an encyclical letter issued in 1929 by Pope Pius XI. In particular, it emphasises the role and purpose of a Catholic school, "proclaim[ing] anew what has already been taught in several documents of the magisterium: (Note: Divini illius Magistri, but also other Papal addresses from Benedict XV onwards; "moreover this law of the Church is proclaimed by many provincial councils and in the most recent declarations of very many of the episcopal conferences".) ... the right of the Church freely to establish and to conduct schools of every type and level".

== Contents ==
After the declaration's introductory material, its numbered sections are as follows:

1. The Meaning of the Universal Right to an Education
2. Christian Education
3. The Authors of Education
4. Various Aids to Christian Education
5. The Importance of Schools
6. The Duties and Rights of Parents
7. Moral and Religious Education in All Schools
8. Catholic Schools
9. Different Types of Catholic Schools
10. Catholic Colleges and Universities
11. Faculties of Sacred Sciences
12. Coordination to be Fostered in Scholastic Matters

The document ends with concluding entreaties to young people, priests, religious men and women, and the laity, to "persevere generously", and to "strive to excel in pedagogy and the pursuit of knowledge".

A note referenced in the Introduction refers to several earlier Catholic documents which had already highlighted "the importance of education", including the works of Popes Benedict XV, Pius XI, Pius XII and John XXIII.

Sections 1 and 2 both speak of rights: the universal "right to education", and the right endowed on "all Christians" to access a "Christian education". In outline, the latter right extends beyond "the maturing of a human person" and

has as its principal purpose this goal: that the baptized, while they are gradually introduced the knowledge of the mystery of salvation, become ever more aware of the gift of faith they have received, and that they learn in addition how to worship God the Father in spirit and truth (cf. John 4:23) especially in liturgical action, and be conformed in their personal lives according to the new man created in justice and holiness of truth (Ephesians 4:22-24); also that they develop into perfect manhood, to the mature measure of the fullness of Christ (cf. Ephesians 4:13) and strive for the growth of the Mystical Body; moreover, that aware of their calling, they learn not only how to bear witness to the hope that is in them (cf. 1 Peter 3:15) but also how to help in the Christian formation of the world that takes place when natural powers viewed in the full consideration of man redeemed by Christ contribute to the good of the whole society.

== Parents as primary educators ==
The declaration states that

Since parents have given children their life, they are bound by the most serious obligation to educate their offspring and therefore must be recognized as the primary and principal educators. This role in education is so important that only with difficulty can it be supplied where it is lacking. Parents are the ones who must create a family atmosphere animated by love and respect for God and man, in which the well-rounded personal and social education of children is fostered. Hence the family is the first school of the social virtues that every society needs."

To this are added two clarifications:

- The family, which undertakes this primary duty, "needs the help of the whole community";
- Certain rights and duties belong also to civil society, "whose role is to direct what is required for the common temporal good".

== Developments ==
The declaration itself anticipated that the principles which it enunciated would "have to be developed at greater length by a special post-conciliar commission and applied by episcopal conferences to varying local situations". The Council made further reference to education in its Decree on the Apostolate of the Laity, promulgated a few weeks later:

The training for the [lay] apostolate should start with the children's earliest education ... [T]hose who have the obligation to provide a Christian education also have the duty of providing formation for the apostolate.

=== Gravissimum Educationis - Culture for Education Foundation ===
On October 28, 2015, Pope Francis founded the Gravissimum Educationis Foundation.

The Foundation is a not-for-profit, and pursues scientific and cultural aims to promote education and culture in the world. In particular, the Foundation aims to promote projects aimed at establishing and consolidating collaborative relationships between entities and institutions active in the educational sector; promote cultural projects and events aimed at fostering, also in the educational sphere, reflection on key topics of contemporary debate and dialogue between arts, cultures and faith; implement projects and initiatives related to the Global Compact on Education.

The Foundation is an instrumental entity and participates in the mission of the Dicastery for Culture and Education of the Holy See, that preserves and promotes the cultural and educational heritage of the Catholic Church.

The Foundation is governed by a Board of Directors chaired by Cardinal José Tolentino de Mendonça. The Secretary General is Monsignor Davide Milani, and the Treasurer is Dr. Paolo Buzzonetti.

=== Drawing New Maps of Hope ===
On October 27, 2025, Pope Leo XIV, at the conclusion of the Jubilee Mass with Pontifical university students, signed an Apostolic Letter entitled Drawing New Maps of Hope in St. Peter's Basilica. The letter, described as "a text that weaves together memory and prophecy, faith and culture, digital awareness and discernment", was made public on the following day, on the occasion of the 60th anniversary of Gravissimum educationis.

== See also ==
- Category:Catholic schools by country
- Category:Roman Catholic schools by continent
- Catholic education
- Catholic university
- Divini illius Magistri
- Ex Corde Ecclesiae
- Parochial school
