= Sacrosanctum Concilium =

Catholic Constitution on the Liturgy

Sacrosanctum Concilium (English: "The Sacred Council"), officially the Constitution on the Sacred Liturgy (Latin: Constitutio de sacra Liturgia), is one of the constitutions of the Second Vatican Council. It was approved by the assembled bishops by a vote of 2,147 to 4 and promulgated by Pope Paul VI on 4 December 1963. The main aim was to revise the traditional liturgical texts and rituals to reflect more fully fundamental principles, and be more pastorally effective in the changed conditions of the times, clarifying the role of ordained ministers and the forms of appropriate participation of lay faithful in the Catholic Church's liturgy, especially that of the Roman Rite. The title is taken from the opening lines of the document and means "This Sacred Council".

== Title ==
The document's official title is the "Constitution on the Sacred Liturgy" (Constitutio de sacra Liturgia), but as is customary with Catholic documents, the recognised name of this constitution, "Sacrosanctum Concilium" in Latin, is taken from the first line (incipit) of the document, which sets the objective of liturgical reform within the wider context of the aims of the "sacred Council": "to impart an ever increasing vigor to the Christian life of the faithful; to adapt more suitably to the needs of our own times those institutions which are subject to change; to foster whatever can promote union among all who believe in Christ; [and] to strengthen whatever can help to call the whole of mankind into the household of the Church."

== Application ==
The principles underlying the Council's liturgical reforms were applicable to the Roman Rite and to the Eastern rites, although the practical norms set out in the Constitution applied only to the Roman Rite. The Council returned to consider the Eastern rites in its November 1964 Decree on the Eastern Catholic Churches.

Instructions were issued for the rites used for all seven of the sacraments of the Catholic Church to be revised.

== Aggiornamento and participation of the laity ==
One of the first issues considered by the council, and the matter that had the most immediate effect on the lives of individual Catholics, was the renewal of the liturgy. The central idea was aggiornamento of the traditional liturgical texts and rituals to reflect more fully fundamental principles, and be more pastorally effective in the changed conditions of the times, clarifying not only the role of ordained ministers but also the forms of appropriate participation of lay faithful.

Mother Church earnestly desires that all the faithful should be led to that fully conscious and active participation in liturgical celebrations which is demanded by the very nature of the liturgy. Such participation by the Christian people as a chosen race, a royal priesthood, a holy nation, a redeemed people (1 Peter 2:9; cf. 2:4–5), is their right and duty by reason of their baptism.

Popes Pius X and Pius XII asked that the people be taught how to chant the responses at Mass and that they learn the prayers of the Mass in order to participate intelligently. Now the bishops decreed that: "To promote active participation, the people should be encouraged to take part by means of acclamations, responses, psalmody, antiphons, and songs." Composers should "produce compositions which ... [provide] for the active participation of the entire assembly of the faithful." In all, there are 12 references to "active participation" in the document.

After centuries when, with the Mass in Latin, Catholic piety centred around popular devotions, the bishops decreed that "Popular devotions ... should be so drawn up that they harmonize with the liturgical seasons, accord with the sacred liturgy, are in some fashion derived from it, and lead the people to it, since, in fact, the liturgy by its very nature far surpasses any of them."

== Implementation ==
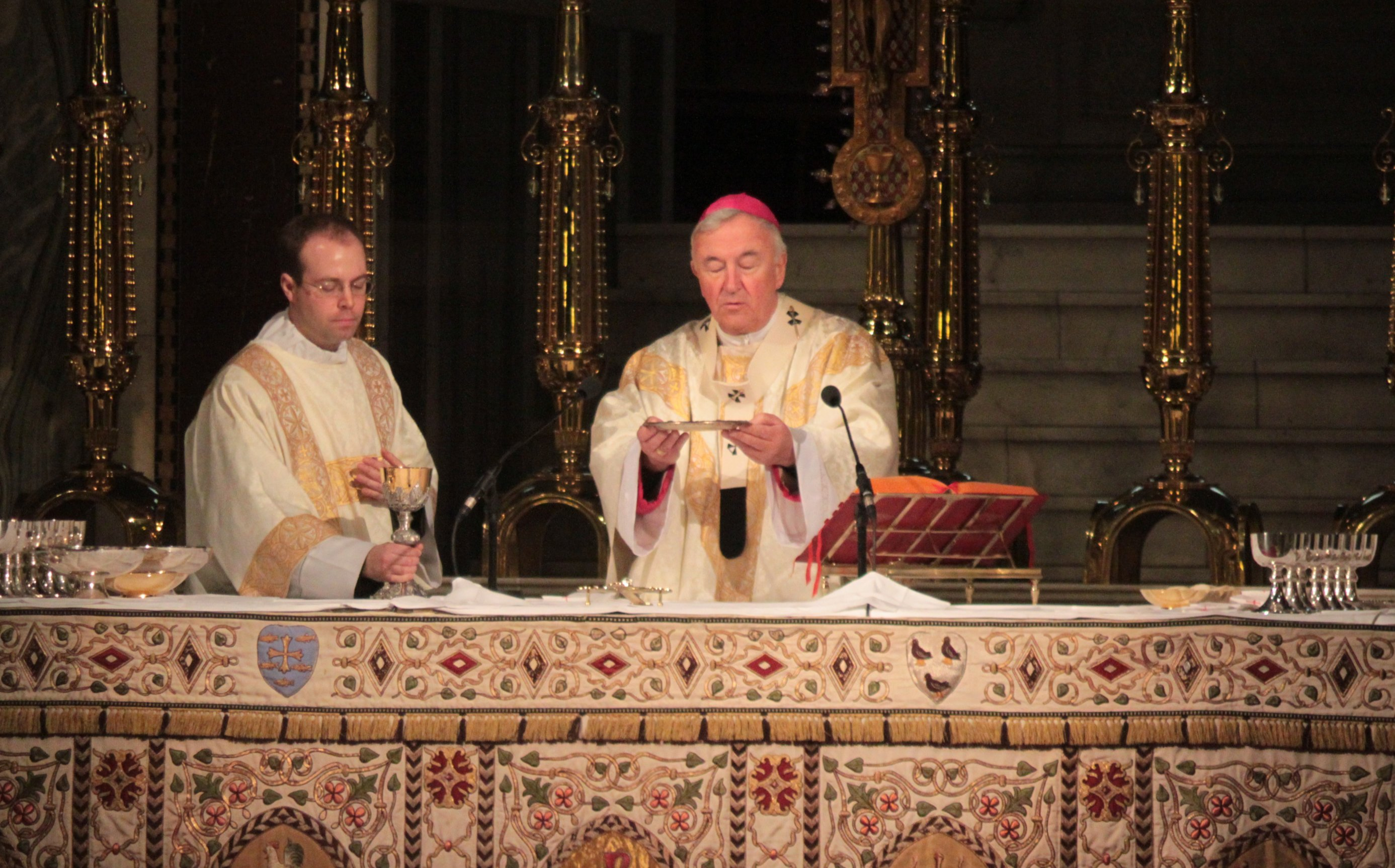
The offering of Mass in Westminster Cathedral in London, celebrated by Archbishop Vincent Nichols, with the use of the Roman Missal, published following the promulgation of Sacrosanctum Concilium

The council fathers established guidelines to govern the renewal of the liturgy, which included, allowed, and encouraged greater use of the vernacular (native language) in addition to Latin, particularly for the biblical readings, intercessions, and other prayers. Implementation of the council's directives on the liturgy was to be carried out under the authority of Pope Paul VI by a special papal commission known as the Council for the Implementation of the Constitution on the Sacred Liturgy (or the Consilium for short), later incorporated in the Congregation for Divine Worship and the Discipline of the Sacraments, and, in the areas entrusted to them, by national conferences of bishops, which, if they had a shared language, were expected to collaborate in producing a common translation. In his encyclical letter of August 1964, Ecclesiam Suam, the pope called for the "intelligent" and "zealous" implementation of the constitution's provisions on the ministry of the Word. The Council, in its Decree on Priestly Training (1965), stated that the teaching of liturgy in seminaries was to follow the principles set out in articles 15 and 16 of the Constitution.

== Legacy ==
Pope John Paul II issued an Apostolic Letter commemorating the 40th anniversary of the constitution, entitled Spiritus et Sponsa ("The Spirit and the Bride") on 4 December 2003.

On 24 August 2017 Pope Francis emphasized that "the reform of the liturgy is irreversible" and called for continued efforts to implement the reforms, repeating what Pope Paul VI had said one year before he died: "The time has come, now, to definitely leave aside the disruptive ferments, equally pernicious in one sense or the other, and to implement fully, according to its right inspiring criteria, the reform approved by us in application of the decisions of the council."

== See also ==
- Mass of Paul VI
- Musicam sacram
- Liturgical Movement
