= Optatam Totius =

Catholic Decree on Priestly Training

Optatam totius, the Second Vatican Council's Decree on Priestly Training, was issued during the final year of the Council (which met from 1963 to 1965) and is concerned with priestly vocations and the formation or training of candidates for ordination. The Latin text's opening words refer to the greatly desired renewal of the whole Church which was the overall objective of the Council.

Approved by a vote of 2,318 of the bishops assembled at the council in favour, and 3 opposed, the decree was promulgated by Pope Paul VI on 28 October 1965.

Oscar Cullmann, a Lutheran observer at the Council, saw the document as "perhaps among the best and most important conciliar texts. ... The text has exceeded our expectations".

== Contents ==
The decree opens with a recognition that the renewal of the church "depends to a great extent" on the ministry of its ordained priests. Its principles are to apply across the whole church including every particular rite, and to the training of both diocesan and religious clergy.

Part 1 states briefly that the responsibility for the specific arrangements for priestly training needed in each country is to be delegated to national episcopal conferences.

Although not reflected in the title of the decree, part 2 is concerned with the "urgent need" to promote vocations to the priesthood.

Part 3 is concerned with major seminaries, part 4 with "spiritual training", and part 5 with "the revision of ecclesiastical studies". Part 6 includes a recognition that "priestly training, because of the circumstances particularly of contemporary society, must be pursued and perfected even after the completion of the course of studies in seminaries".

The decree was followed some weeks later by Presbyterorum Ordinis, the Council's decree on the ministry and life of priests. The publication and legacy of both documents was recalled by Pope Leo XIV in an 2025 apostolic letter commemorating their sixtieth anniversary.
