= Christus Dominus =

Catholic Decree on the Pastoral Office of Bishops

Christus Dominus (Christ the Lord; abbreviation "CD") is the Second Vatican Council's Decree on the Pastoral Office of Bishops in the Church. The document was approved by a majority vote of 2,319 to 2 of the assembled bishops and was promulgated by Pope Paul VI on 28 October 1965.

Christus Dominus calls for strong episcopal conferences of bishops, to set the standard for the church in their region, while fully supporting the Vatican and the Pope. It outlines how bishops exercise their office at three levels: in the universal church (chapter one), in their own "particular church" or diocese (chapter two), and at the regional or national level (chapter three), and concludes with a "general directive" relating to the revision of the code of canon law which had commenced alongside the work of the Council.

== Background ==
The First Vatican Council of 1869–1870 focused on the office of the Pope and defined the doctrine of "papal infallibility" but did not discuss other bishops. Thus, when Pope John XXIII called for a Second Vatican Council, everyone expected it to take up this unfinished business.

Christus Dominus summarises the role of the Pope as "the successor of Peter", who holds

supreme, full, immediate, and universal authority over the care of souls by divine institution. Therefore, as pastor of all the faithful, he is sent to provide for the common good of the universal Church and for the good of the individual churches. Hence, he holds a primacy of ordinary power over all the churches.

The Council's Dogmatic Constitution on the Church (Lumen gentium) had already referred the previous year to the ministry of bishops within the church, the unity of the episcopal order and the nature of the "episcopal body" represented by all the bishops "in communion with one another and with the Bishop of Rome". In this context, and leaving the theology of the episcopate to Lumen gentium, the Council fathers now wished "to determine more exactly the pastoral office of bishops".

Two preliminary texts lay behind the decree: one focused on bishops, and another dealing more comprehensively with "the care of souls". The latter was not formally debated at the Council but its contents influenced the final composition of the decree.

== Contents ==
=== Bishops ===
The three substantive chapters of the decree reflect how bishops should exercise their office at three levels: in the universal church (chapter one), in their own "particular church" or diocese (chapter two), and at the regional or national level (chapter three). The role of the bishops of the church was brought into renewed prominence, especially when seen collectively, as a college that has succeeded to that of the apostles in teaching and governing the church. This college does not exist without its head, the successor of St. Peter.

In these days especially bishops frequently are unable to fulfill their office effectively and fruitfully unless they develop a common effort involving constant growth in harmony and closeness of ties with other bishops. Episcopal conferences, already established in many nations, have furnished outstanding proofs of a more fruitful apostolate. Therefore, this sacred synod considers it to be supremely fitting that everywhere bishops belonging to the same nation or region form an association which would meet at fixed times. Thus, when the insights of prudence and experience have been shared and views exchanged, there will emerge a holy union of energies in the service of the common good of the churches.

The text affirms that bishops are members of the church's episcopal body "by virtue of sacramental consecration and hierarchical communion with the head and members of the college", taking its lead in this regard from Lumen gentium's assertion of the same principle. Individually and collectively, bishops are told that they "should manifest a concern for all the churches", not just their own diocese.

"Teaching, sanctifying and governing" are highlighted as episcopal functions, but "conspicuous among the principal duties" of a bishop is a teaching role: "they should announce the Gospel of Christ to men, calling them to a faith in the power of the Spirit or confirming them in a living faith. They should expound the whole mystery of Christ to them, namely, those truths the ignorance of which is ignorance of Christ".

Bishops are to be appointed "exclusively" through church processes, with the roles formerly granted to civil authorities involved in nominating or appointing bishops being removed from the date of the Council. The decree's provisions in this regard are mirrored in the Code of Canon Law, canon 378 §5.

=== Dioceses ===
An ambitious review of diocesan boundaries, "to the extent required by the good of souls", was commissioned by the decree. The decree stated that "extent of the diocese and the number of its inhabitants" should fit with the capacity of a bishop to undertake his various functions, assisted as necessary, while also offering scope for the bishop and his clergy to "usefully devote all their energies to the ministry", without neglecting the needs of the wider Church. A review of the boundaries of the dioceses of the Paris region, considered before the Council but formally commenced in October 1966, acted as a test case, intended to illustrate how reorganising principles could be applied in very large cities.

The role and importance of the diocesan curia and other institutions and personnel who assist the bishop in his diocesan ministry are emphasised, along with an exhortation that each diocese should establish a "pastoral council" or "pastoral commission", to be led by the bishop, where "specially chosen clergy, religious and lay people" would also contribute to the planning of pastoral initiatives.

=== Clergy ===
The decree addresses the relationships between all clergy and diocesan bishops, but notes that pride of place "is held by diocesan priests who are incardinated or attached to a particular church, for they have fully dedicated themselves in the service of caring for a single portion of the Lord's flock". It introduces the idea that the bishop should maintain a regular dialogue with his diocesan clergy.

=== Episcopal collaboration ===
Later parts of the decree deal with cooperation and collaboration between bishops, promoting the development of episcopal conferences, ecclesiastical regions, where appropriate, military vicariates "in every nation, if possible", and other inter-diocesan offices where they will serve "the common good of many churches".

== Clarification ==
Claims made by some, that the council gave the church two separate earthly heads, the College of Bishops and the Pope, were countered by the Preliminary Explanatory Note added to the Lumen gentium in 1964 and printed at the end of the text. This Note states:

There is no such thing as the college without its head ... and in the college the head preserves intact his function as Vicar of Christ and pastor of the universal Church. In other words it is not a distinction between the Roman Pontiff and the bishops taken together, but between the Roman Pontiff by himself and the Roman Pontiff along with the bishops.

== See also ==
- Ecclesiae Sanctae: Pope Paul VI's motu proprio on implementation of the decree
- Appointment of Catholic bishops
- Hierarchy of the Catholic Church
- Lists of patriarchs, archbishops, and bishops
