= Perfectae Caritatis =

Catholic decree on religious life

Perfectae Caritatis, the Decree on the Adaptation and Renewal of Religious Life, is a document issued by the Second Vatican Council which deals specifically with institutes of consecrated life in the Roman Catholic Church. One of the shorter documents of the Council, the decree was approved by a vote of 2,321 to 4 of the assembled bishops, and promulgated by Pope Paul VI on 28 October 1965. As is customary for Church documents, the title is taken from the first words (incipit) of the decree in Latin, which mean "of Perfect Charity".

== Content ==
The Second Vatican Council had already given an exposition of the nature of religious life in chapter 6 of the Constitution Lumen gentium, and Perfectae Caritatis reflected the principles of religious life as established therein. This chapter described the essential form of religious life as a life "consecrated by the profession of the evangelical counsels" (n. 44).

The Decree Perfectae Caritatis was adopted in order to "treat of the life and discipline of those institutes whose members make profession of chastity, poverty and obedience and to provide for their needs in our time" (Perfectae Caritatis n. 1). Its scope includes societies of common life whose members do not take vows, and secular institutes, while recognising that these have certain different characteristics (Perfectae Caritatis n. 1). Franc Rodé sees the decree also as "clarifying" some aspects of Lumen gentium.

Containing 25 numbered sections, the Decree established five general principles to guide the renewal of each institute. The foremost of these stated that "the ultimate norm of the religious life is the following of Christ set forth in the Gospels"; secondly, institutes should refer back to their founders' spirituality and aims. Thirdly, "all institutes should share in the life of the Church"; they should be tied to "the social conditions of the times they live in and of the needs of the Church"; and their members should "keep in mind" that "the purpose of the religious life is to help the members follow Christ and be united to God through the profession of the evangelical counsels" (Perfectae Caritatis n. 2).

Because of the broad variety of religious communities with their different histories, characteristics, customs, and missions, the Council did not give specific directions, and left to each individual order or congregation the authority to determine what needed to be changed in accord with the spirit of their founders, the needs of modern life, and the situations where they lived and worked.

Section 10 of the document made provision for religious congregations of lay brothers to have some of their members ordained into the priesthood in order to "meet the need for priestly ministrations in their own houses, provided that the lay character of the community remains unchanged". In 1995, Pope John Paul II reflected on this statement, noting that

This is a possibility to be evaluated in accordance with the needs of time and place, but in harmony with the most ancient tradition of monastic institutes, which are thus able to flourish again. The Council recognized this possibility and stated that there was no impediment to its implementation: but it lets the highest governing assembly of these institutes — the General Chapter — decide, without offering explicit encouragement in this regard, precisely because it is concerned that these institutes of "brothers" continue in line with their vocation and mission.

== Implementation ==
On August 6, 1966 Pope Paul VI issued Ecclesiae Sanctae, an apostolic letter on the implementation of certain conciliar documents, including Perfectae Caritatis.

== Aftermath ==
The period that followed the promulgation of Perfectae Caritatis was marked by extensive change and a huge amount of experimentation in religious life. Many institutes replaced their traditional habits with more modern attire, experimented with different forms of prayer and community life, allowed religious to use their baptismal names as a religious name, and adapted obedience to a superior to a form of consultation and discussion. Religious sister Mary Kenny comments that "some religious have entered generously and willingly into the work of renewal. Others, for reasons best known to themselves, have chosen to remain at the fringes or have resisted what has been happening". A great number of religious have left religious life entirely, (Note: Bruce Lescher notes that as of 1990, departures were proportionately greatest among lay brothers.) and in subsequent decades there was a large drop the number of religious vocations in the western world. It is not clear how much of this change was due to the renewal envisaged by the Second Vatican Council. Historians note that western society as a whole was going through social turmoil caused by the sexual revolution.

A two-day symposium was organised by the Vatican in 2005 to commemorate the fortieth anniversary of the decree and to "review the journey made" by the Church in the intervening years.
