= Second Vatican Council =

Most recent Catholic ecumenical council (1962-1965)

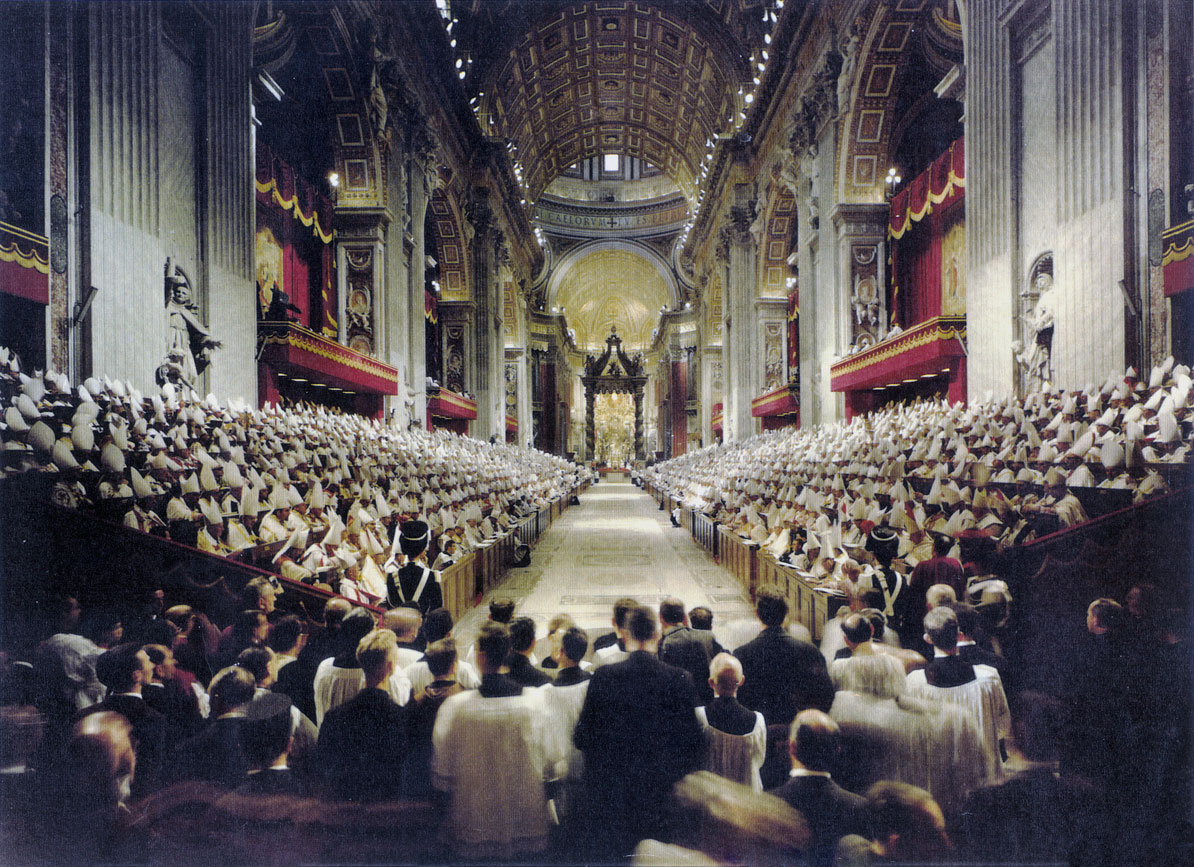
- Council Fathers in St. Peter's Basilica
- Date: 11 October 1962 – 8 December 1965
- Accepted by: Catholic Church
- Previous council: First Vatican Council
- Convoked by: Pope John XXIII
- President: Pope John XXIII; Pope Paul VI
- Attendance: Up to 2,625
- Topics: Renewal of Catholic life and discipline; liturgical reform; ecumenism; the Church's relationship with the modern world
- Documents and statements: Four constitutions: Sacrosanctum Concilium (Sacred liturgy); Lumen gentium (Catholic Church); Dei verbum (Divine revelation); Gaudium et spes (Modern world); Nine decrees: Inter mirifica (Media); Orientalium Ecclesiarum (Eastern Catholics); Unitatis redintegratio (Ecumenism); Christus Dominus (Role of bishops); Perfectae caritatis (Religious life); Optatam totius (Priestly training); Apostolicam actuositatem (Role of the laity); Ad gentes (Mission activity); Presbyterorum ordinis (Role of priests); Three declarations: Gravissimum educationis (Education); Nostra aetate (Non-Christian religions); Dignitatis humanae (Religious freedom)

The Second Ecumenical Council of the Vatican, commonly called the Second Vatican Council or Vatican II, was the twenty-first and most recent ecumenical council of the Catholic Church. It met in four annual sessions in St. Peter's Basilica in Vatican City between 11 October 1962 and 8 December 1965, spanning the pontificates of Pope John XXIII, who convoked it, and Pope Paul VI, who presided over its final three sessions and promulgated all sixteen of its documents.

John XXIII, elected in 1958 at the age of seventy-six and widely expected to preside over a brief, uneventful pontificate, announced the council less than three months into his papacy and described its purpose with the Italian word aggiornamento, "bringing up to date." Roughly 2,900 bishops and the heads of male religious orders were entitled to attend; nearly 2,500 did so at some point, along with theological advisers, non-Catholic observers, and, from the second session onward, a small number of lay auditors. Over four sessions the bishops debated and revised dozens of draft texts, eventually approving four constitutions, nine decrees, and three declarations covering the liturgy, the nature of the Catholic Church, divine revelation, the Catholic Church's relationship to the modern world, ecumenism, religious freedom, and the Catholic Church's stance toward non-Christian religions.

The council's decisions reshaped the Roman Rite, permitting the vernacular languages into a liturgy that had been celebrated almost entirely in Latin for centuries, and set in motion changes to the church's relations with other Christian communities, with Judaism, and with the modern secular state that were still being debated sixty years later. Later Catholic scholarship has disagreed sharply over how to characterise this change: some historians treat the council chiefly as a body of texts to be read against continuous Catholic tradition, while others, following an interpretive current associated with Fr. Joseph Komonchak, argue that Vatican II is better understood as a historical "event" whose meaning was not settled by the documents alone but continued to be worked out, contested, and applied in the decades that followed.

== Background ==
Two currents in earlier twentieth-century Catholic thought fed directly into the council's work. The first was a renewal of biblical scholarship. Pope Pius XII's 1943 encyclical Divino afflante Spiritu had encouraged Catholic exegetes to use the original Hebrew and Greek texts of scripture and the methods of modern critical scholarship, rather than working exclusively from the Latin Vulgate, and gave ecclesiastical sanction to a generation of biblical scholarship that would inform the council's later teaching on revelation in Dei verbum.

The second was a theological movement, associated above all with French and Belgian Dominicans and Jesuits, that called for a return to the Bible, the early Church Fathers, and the liturgical sources of the tradition rather than the manual-based scholasticism that dominated seminary teaching. Historians commonly call this movement ressourcement; its leading figures included Henri de Lubac, Yves Congar, Jean Daniélou, Marie-Dominique Chenu, and Hans Urs von Balthasar. This movement provoked real institutional conflict. Pius XII's 1950 encyclical Humani generis criticised theological tendencies the pope considered dangerous, without naming individual authors, and in its aftermath several of these theologians were removed from teaching posts or barred from publishing. This was strikingly reversed by John XXIII as he appointed both de Lubac and Congar as council experts, and other theologians who had been under a cloud in the 1950s, they became architects of the documents on revelation, the church, and ecumenism.

Vatican II also inherited unfinished business from its predecessor. The First Vatican Council opened in December 1869 but was suspended in September 1870 after the Italian army captured Rome during Italian unification, before it had addressed the theology of the episcopate or the place of the laity in the church; it had completed only its teaching on papal primacy and on the relationship of faith and reason. Bokenkotter treats the theology of collegiality and the laity as among the questions Vatican I left open for its successor to take up. Paul VI made the same connection explicit in his 1964 encyclical Ecclesiam Suam, describing Vatican II as continuing work Vatican I had been unable to finish.

== Convocation and preparation ==
John XXIII announced his intention to call an ecumenical council on 25 January 1959, addressing a small group of cardinals at the Basilica of Saint Paul Outside the Walls; the announcement, delivered less than three months after his election, appears to have taken even senior churchmen by surprise. He framed the council's purpose around three related aims: renewing the internal life of the church, advancing the cause of Christian unity, and enabling the church to speak more effectively to contemporary social and political problems.

Formal preparation took nearly three years. An antepreparatory commission, appointed in May 1959, surveyed bishops, universities, and Curial departments for topics the council might address; in June 1960 this gave way to ten preparatory commissions, most of them attached to a department of the Roman Curia and chaired by its head, which drafted the texts, or schemas, that would form the basis of debate. The council was formally convoked by the apostolic constitution Humanae Salutis on 25 December 1961. The draft texts that emerged from this process varied considerably in character: those produced by the liturgical commission and by the Secretariat for Promoting Christian Unity leaned toward substantial renewal, while several others largely restated existing manualist theology and drew sharp criticism once debate opened on the council floor.

== The council in session ==
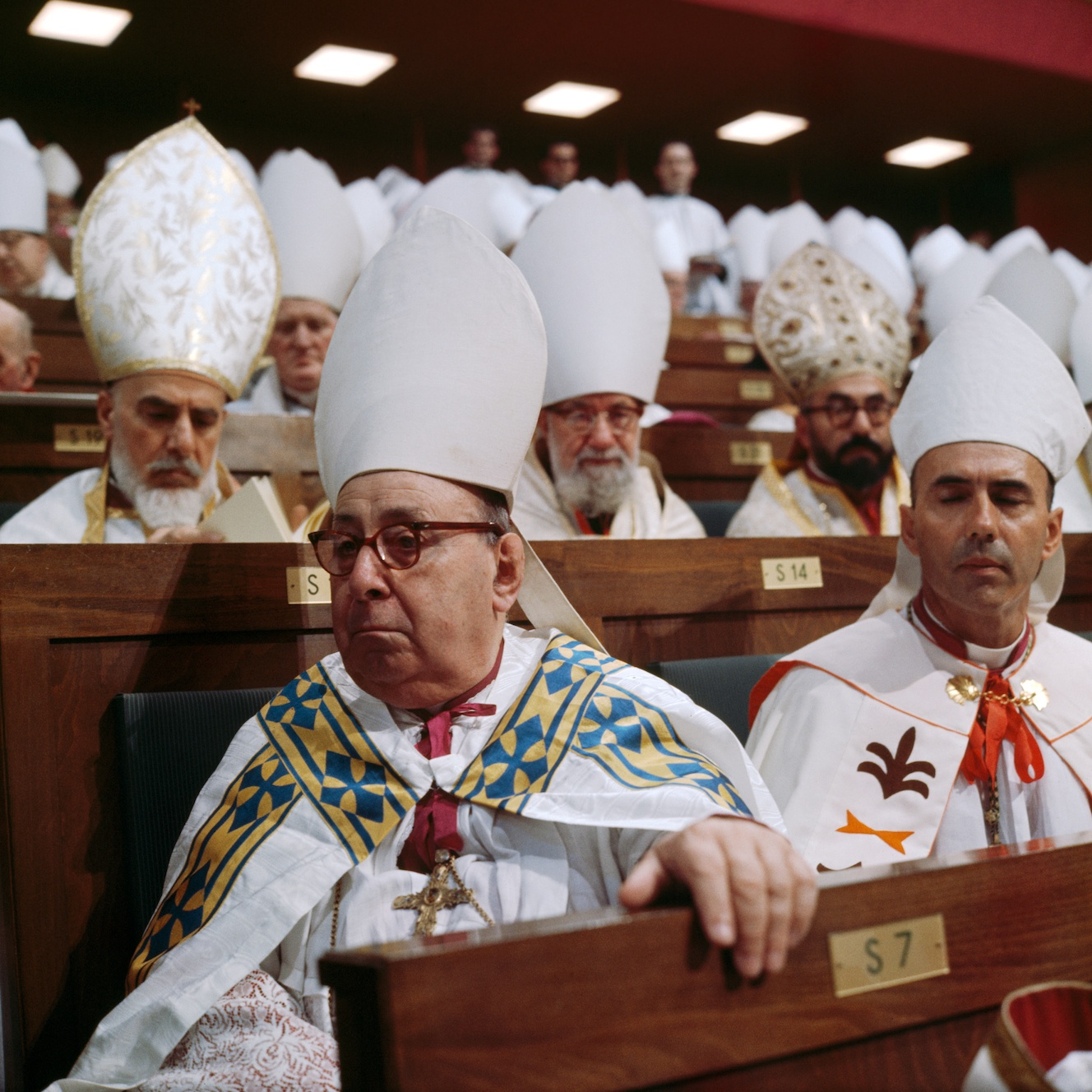
Council Fathers at the council.

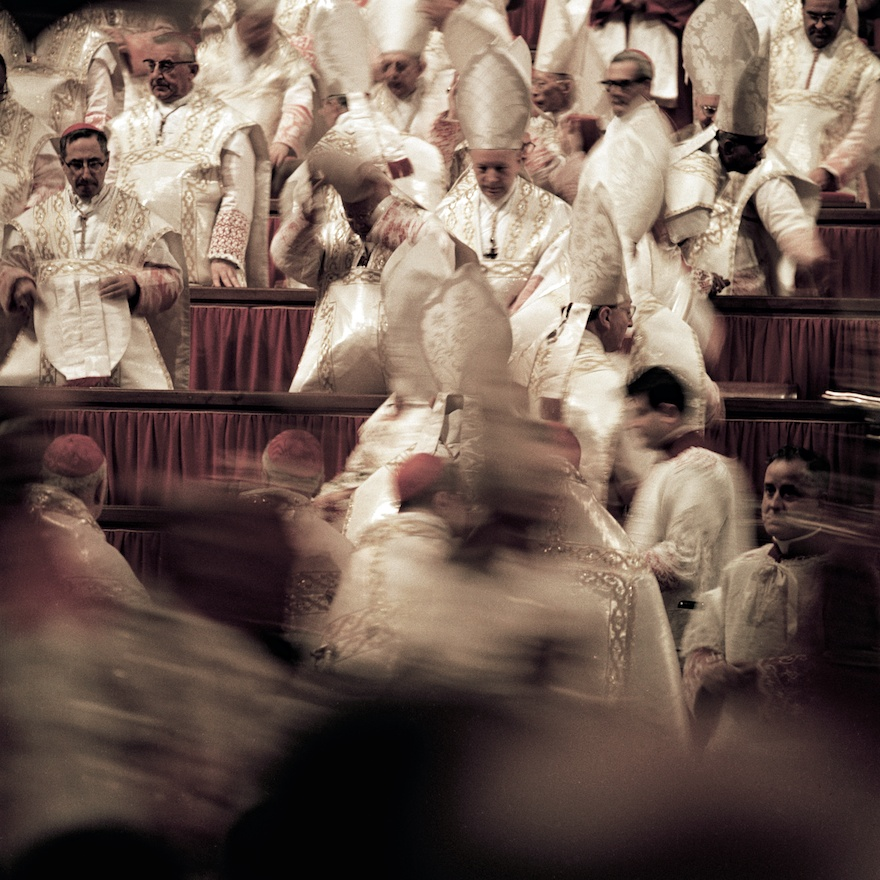
Council Fathers in Vestments.

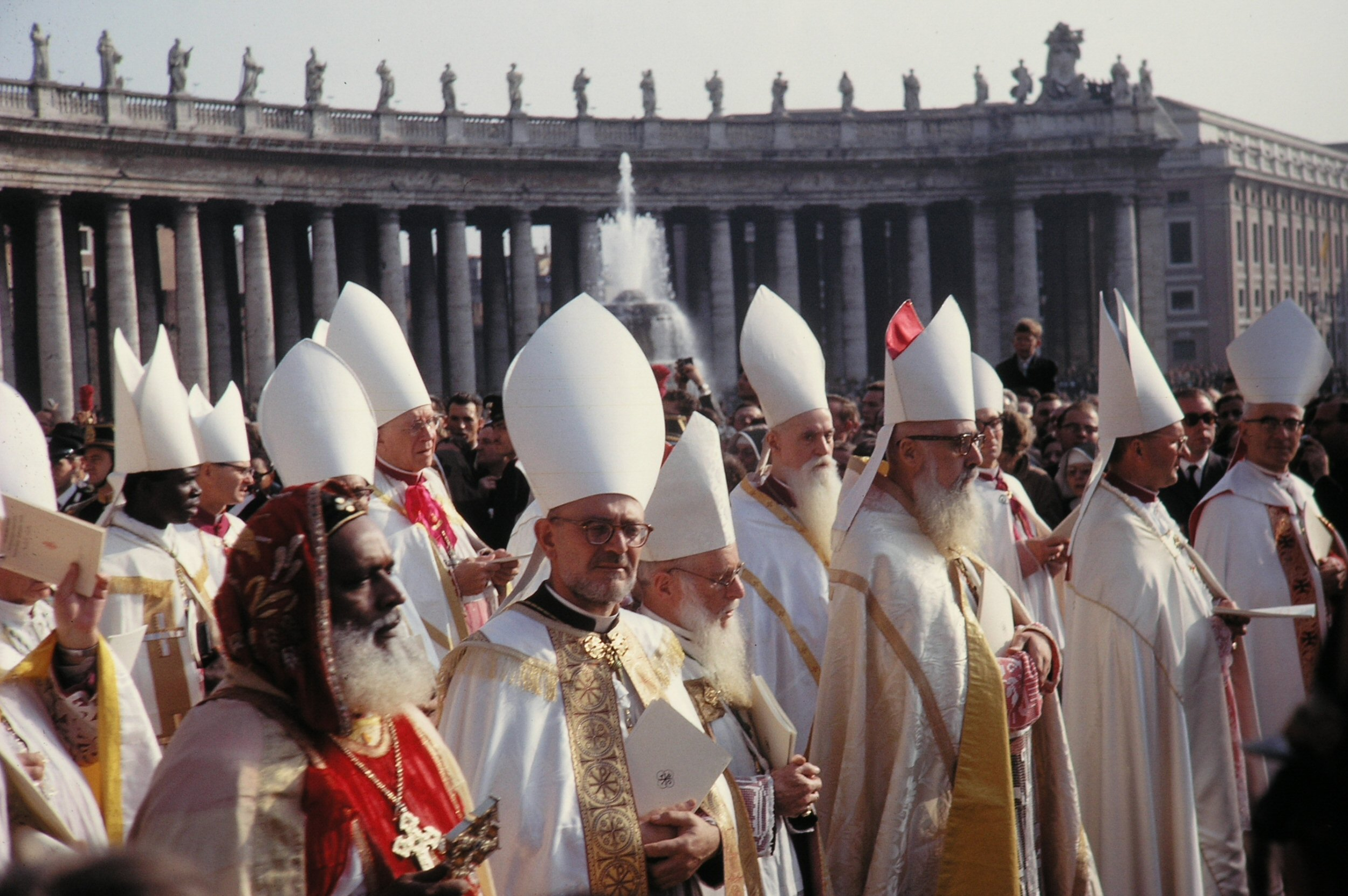
Council Fathers from various sui juris churches processing on the opening day in St. Peter's Square

John XXIII opened the council on 11 October 1962 with the address Gaudet Mater Ecclesia, delivered to an assembly beginning with a procession of some 2,400 bishops across St Peter's Square on a morning after heavy rain, watched by observers from other Christian communities and representatives of eighty-six governments. In the speech John XXIII distanced himself from what he called "prophets of doom" who saw only decline in the modern world, and urged the bishops to favour "the medicine of mercy" over condemnation in the documents they would produce.

The first session, running to 8 December 1962, quickly exposed the fault line that would run through the whole council; as a majority of bishops wanted the preparatory schemas substantially rewritten, while a Curial minority, including Cardinal Alfredo Ottaviani of the Holy Office, preferred to keep closer to the prepared texts. Reform-minded bishops who took a leading role in the debates included Cardinal Augustin Bea of the Secretariat for Promoting Christian Unity, Cardinal Achille Liénart of Lille, Cardinal Josef Frings of Cologne, Cardinal Bernardus Alfrink of Utrecht, Cardinal Leo Jozef Suenens of Mechelen-Brussels, and the Melkite Greek Catholic patriarch Maximos IV Sayegh; more conservative positions were associated with Ottaviani, Cardinal Michael Browne, Cardinal Giuseppe Siri of Genoa, Cardinal Ernesto Ruffini of Palermo, and Archbishop Marcel Lefebvre. Theologians serving as periti--expert advisers to the bishops--included several figures who had faced restrictions a decade earlier, among them de Lubac and Congar, alongside Karl Rahner, the American Jesuit John Courtney Murray, Edward Schillebeeckx, and the young Joseph Ratzinger, later Pope Benedict XVI.

John XXIII died on 3 June 1963, between the first and second sessions and therefore the council was suspended in accordance with Canon Law until the next pope decided whether or not it would continue. John's successor, Paul VI, confirmed the day after his election that the council would continue, that it would be his "chief work", and that it would reconvene that September.

The second session (29 September – 4 December 1963) produced the council's first completed document, the Constitution on the Sacred Liturgy. The third session (14 September – 21 November 1964) approved the Constitution on the Church and the decree on ecumenism, among others, and saw the admission of the first women auditors. The fourth and final session (14 September – 8 December 1965) was the busiest by far, promulgating eleven of the sixteen documents, including the two most contested: the declaration on religious freedom and the pastoral constitution on the Catholic Church in the modern world. The council closed on 8 December 1965 with ceremonies in St Peter's Square.

== Documents of the council ==
The council's teaching is contained in sixteen documents: four constitutions, nine decrees, and three declarations. Most passed by overwhelming majorities; several of the more contested texts nonetheless drew opposition in the hundreds.

Document	Date of approval of final text	Vote on final text	Date of promulgation	Vote preceding promulgation
Constitutions
Church	19 November 1964	2,134 to 10	21 November 1964	2,151 to 5
Revelation	29 October 1965	2,081 to 27	18 November 1965	2,344 to 6
Liturgy	22 November 1963	2,159 to 19	4 December 1963	2,147 to 4
Church and Modern World	6 December 1965	2,111 to 251	7 December 1965	2,309 to 75
Decrees
Bishops	6 October 1965	2,167 to 14	28 October 1965	2,319 to 2
Priestly Ministry	4 December 1965	2,243 to 11	7 December 1965	2,390 to 4
Priestly Formation	13 October 1965	2,196 to 15	28 October 1965	2,318 to 3
Religious Life	11 October 1965	2,126 to 13	28 October 1965	2,321 to 4
Lay Apostolate	10 November 1965	2,201 to 2	18 November 1965	2,305 to 2
Eastern Churches	20 November 1964	1,964 to 135	21 November 1964	2,110 to 39
Ecumenism	20 November 1964	2,054 to 64	21 November 1964	2,137 to 11
Missions	2 December 1965	2,162 to 18	7 December 1965	2,394 to 5
Media	24 November 1963	1,598 to 503	4 December 1963	1,960 to 164
Declarations
Non-Christian Religions	15 October 1965	1,763 to 250	28 October 1965	2,221 to 88
Religious Freedom	19 November 1965	1,954 to 249	7 December 1965	2,308 to 70
Christian Education	14 October 1965	1,912 to 183	28 October 1965	2,290 to 35

=== The Constitution on the Sacred Liturgy ===
Sacrosanctum Concilium (SC), the Constitution on the Sacred Liturgy, was the first document the council completed, approved on 4 December 1963. It described the liturgy as the "summit toward which the activity of the Church is directed" and the "font from which all her power flows" (SC 10), and made "full, conscious, and active participation" of the laity in worship its central demand (SC 14). A close reading of the text published in the Irish journal The Furrow for the constitution's fiftieth anniversary counts twelve separate uses of the phrase "active participation" across the document and treats it as the central idea of the whole text rather than an incidental theme.

The constitution called for scripture to be read more extensively at Mass, for rites to be simplified, and for a wider, though not exclusive, use of the vernacular languages: it specified that Latin should be preserved in the Latin rites while allowing that the vernacular might be introduced, particularly for the readings and the people's parts, where local bishops judged it useful (SC 36). The constitution did not itself prescribe how the reform would be carried out, and much of what became associated with the "new Mass"--Vernacular hymns, the priest facing the congregation, standing to receive Communion--was introduced afterward by implementing legislation rather than being mandated by the constitution's own text.

=== The Dogmatic Constitution on the Church ===
Lumen gentium (LG), promulgated 21 November 1964, described the church in a deliberately layered way, as mystery, as sacrament, as the People of God, and as a hierarchical communion, rather than adopting a single controlling image. Its teaching on the universal call to holiness held that every Christian, regardless of state or rank, is called to the fullness of Christian life and to the perfection of charity (LG 40); Paul VI later called this "the most characteristic and ultimate purpose of the teachings of the Council."

The constitution's third chapter, on episcopal collegiality, was its most contested section. It affirmed that bishops, in union with the pope, share collective responsibility for the whole Church (LG 22), a claim a substantial minority of Council Fathers feared would revive the fifteenth-century heresy of Conciliarism, which had held a general council to be superior in authority to the pope. To reassure that minority, a "Preliminary Note of Explanation" was added to the text on 16 November 1964, reaffirming that the bishops' college exercises authority only together with, and never without, the pope's consent; opposition to the chapter fell from 322 votes to 46 the following day, and reduced to just five in the final vote only 1 week later.

=== The Dogmatic Constitution on Divine Revelation ===
Dei verbum (DV) was promulgated 18 November 1965 --after the longest gestation of any conciliar document. It taught that scripture and tradition together form a single sacred deposit of God's word, whose authentic interpretation belongs to the church's teaching office rather than to private judgment. It described the study of scripture as "the soul of sacred theology" (DV 24) and encouraged the faithful to read the Bible directly, a marked change from a pre-conciliar discipline in which lay Bible reading, while never prohibited outright, was not widely encouraged.

=== The Pastoral Constitution on the Church in the Modern World ===
Gaudium et spes (GS), promulgated on the council's final day, 7 December 1965, was the longest of the sixteen documents and the only one addressed explicitly beyond the Catholic Church, to "the whole of humanity." It treated human dignity, marriage and the family, culture, economic life, and the political order, and in its closing chapter condemned as a crime against God and humanity itself any act of war "directed to the indiscriminate destruction of whole cities or vast areas with their inhabitants" (GS 80), language widely read afterward as a condemnation of the use of nuclear and other weapons of mass destruction against civilian populations.

=== The other decrees and declarations ===
Several decrees adjusted Church governance and formation in the direction the constitutions on the church and the liturgy had set. Christus Dominus applied the teaching on collegiality to the pastoral office of diocesan bishops; Presbyterorum ordinis was about the ministry and life of priests, including their relationship to the bishop, preaching, and pastoral care; and Optatam totius called for seminary formation to be adapted to local circumstances under the joint authority of episcopal conferences and Rome. A further pair of decrees addressed particular states of life: Perfectae caritatis called religious orders to renew themselves by returning to the spirit of their founders while adapting to changed circumstances, and Apostolicam actuositatem described the mission of lay Catholics in family life, work, politics, and charitable activity as flowing directly from baptism rather than being merely delegated by the clergy.

A second group of documents concerned the church's relations outward. Orientalium Ecclesiarum affirmed the standing of the Eastern Catholic Churches as particular churches with their own liturgical, spiritual, and canonical traditions, equal in dignity to the Latin Church. Unitatis redintegratio named the restoration of unity among Christians as one of the council's principal concerns and, breaking with earlier Catholic language that had described the return of separated Christians in essentially one-directional terms, acknowledged that genuine elements of sanctification and truth exist among Christian communities outside the Catholic Church's own visible boundaries. Ad gentes set out the theological basis for the church's missionary activity, and Inter mirifica, on the press, cinema, and broadcasting, is generally regarded by historians of the council, O'Malley among them, as one of its weakest documents, criticised at the time and since for treating the media in narrowly moralistic terms.

Nostra aetate (NA), on the Catholic Church's relationship to non-Christian religions, addressed Hinduism, Buddhism, and especially Islam and Judaism in turn and stated that the Catholic Church "rejects nothing that is true and holy" in these traditions. Its fourth section repudiated the traditional charge of collective Jewish responsibility for the death of Christ and condemned antisemitism in any form (NA 4). The history of the declaration's drafting traces its language to a small, largely unofficial network of Catholic converts and sympathetic theologians in Central Europe who had worked against Nazi antisemitism in the 1930s--among them Johannes Oesterreicher, himself a convert from Judaism, and the German theologian Karl Thieme. Connelly argues that without this earlier, largely forgotten network the declaration's break with centuries of Catholic teaching on the Jews would not have been possible.

Gravissimum educationis, on Christian education, addressed Catholic schooling and the rights of parents in their children's education. It drew wide dissatisfaction among the bishops even as it passed, reflected in one of the higher negative votes among the council's declarations.

Dignitatis humanae (DH), the declaration on religious freedom, was the council's most contested text and, on most tallies, the one that drew the largest negative vote of any document the council approved. Formulated chiefly through the drafting work of the American Jesuit John Courtney Murray, It grounded a right to religious freedom in the dignity of the human person rather than in any prior claim about the truth of a particular religion, (DH 2) — repudiating, or superseding the pre-conciliar doctrine of "Error has no rights" . A minority of bishops, including Archbishop Lefebvre, voted against the text on the ground that it could not be reconciled with earlier papal teaching on the obligations of Catholic states toward the true religion; though notably, Lefebvre's own signature nonetheless appears among those affixed to the promulgated document, as it did with every text approved on the council's last day.

== Liturgical practice after the council ==
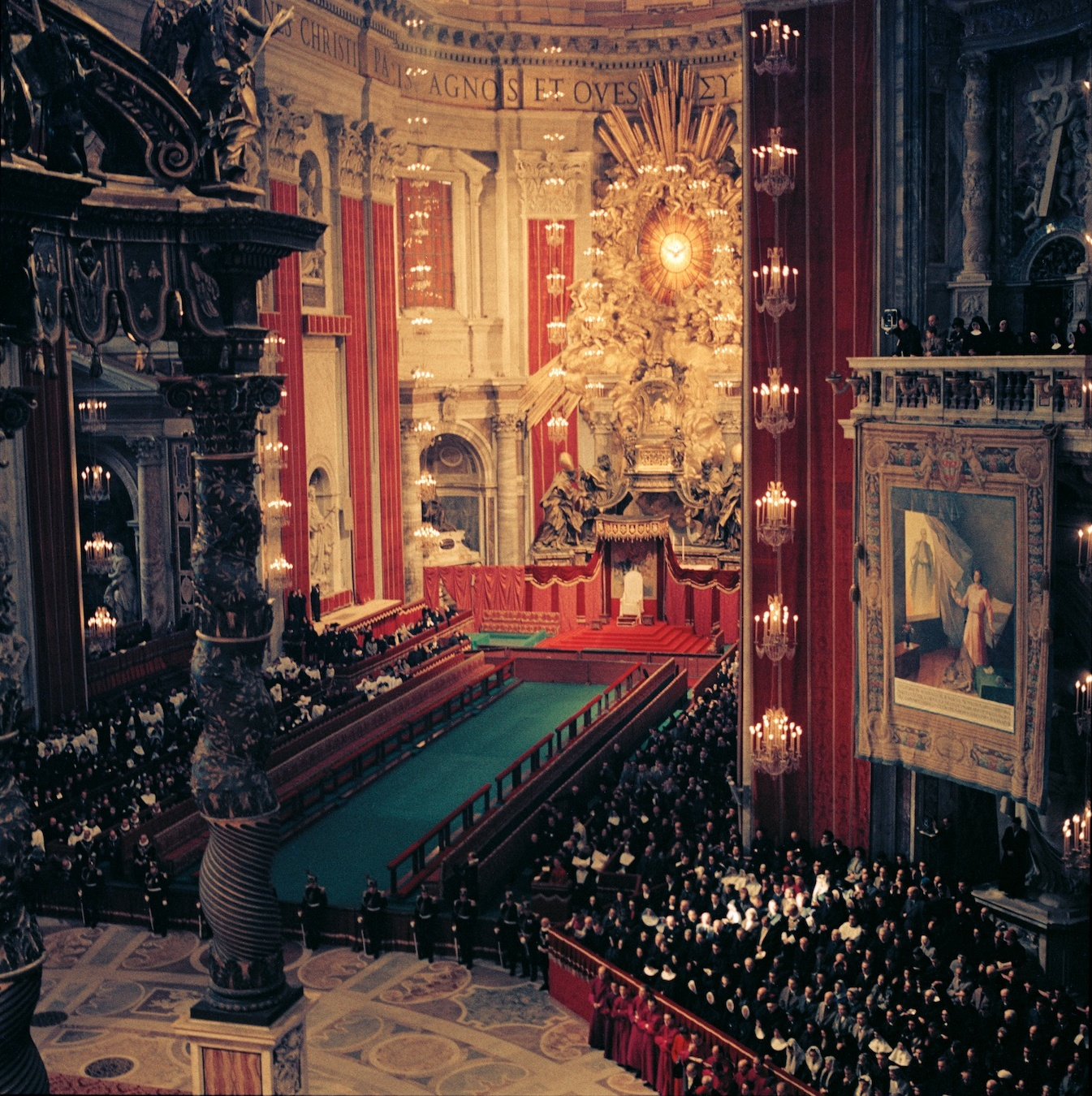
Before a papal Mass at the council in St. Peter's Basilica.

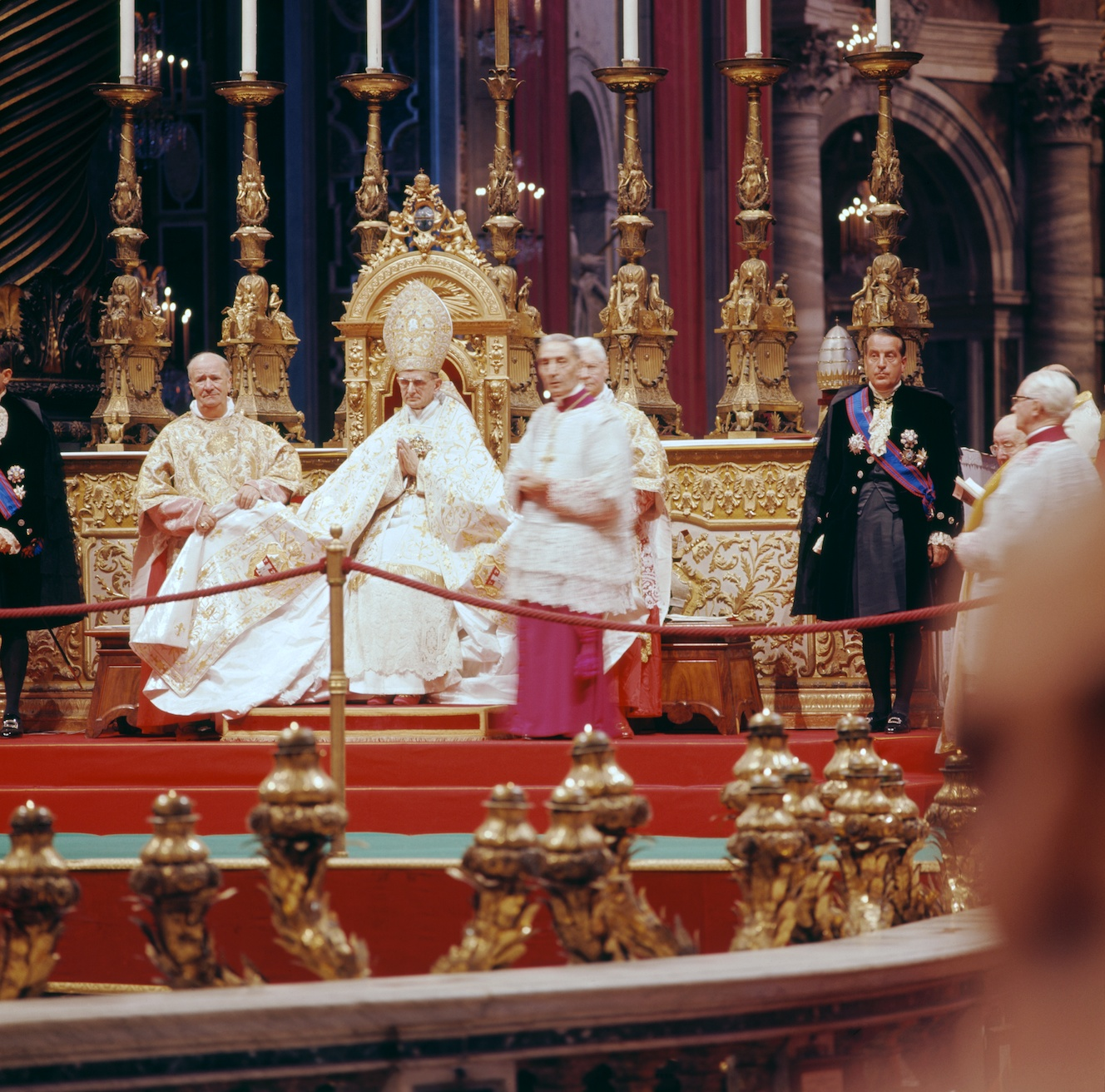
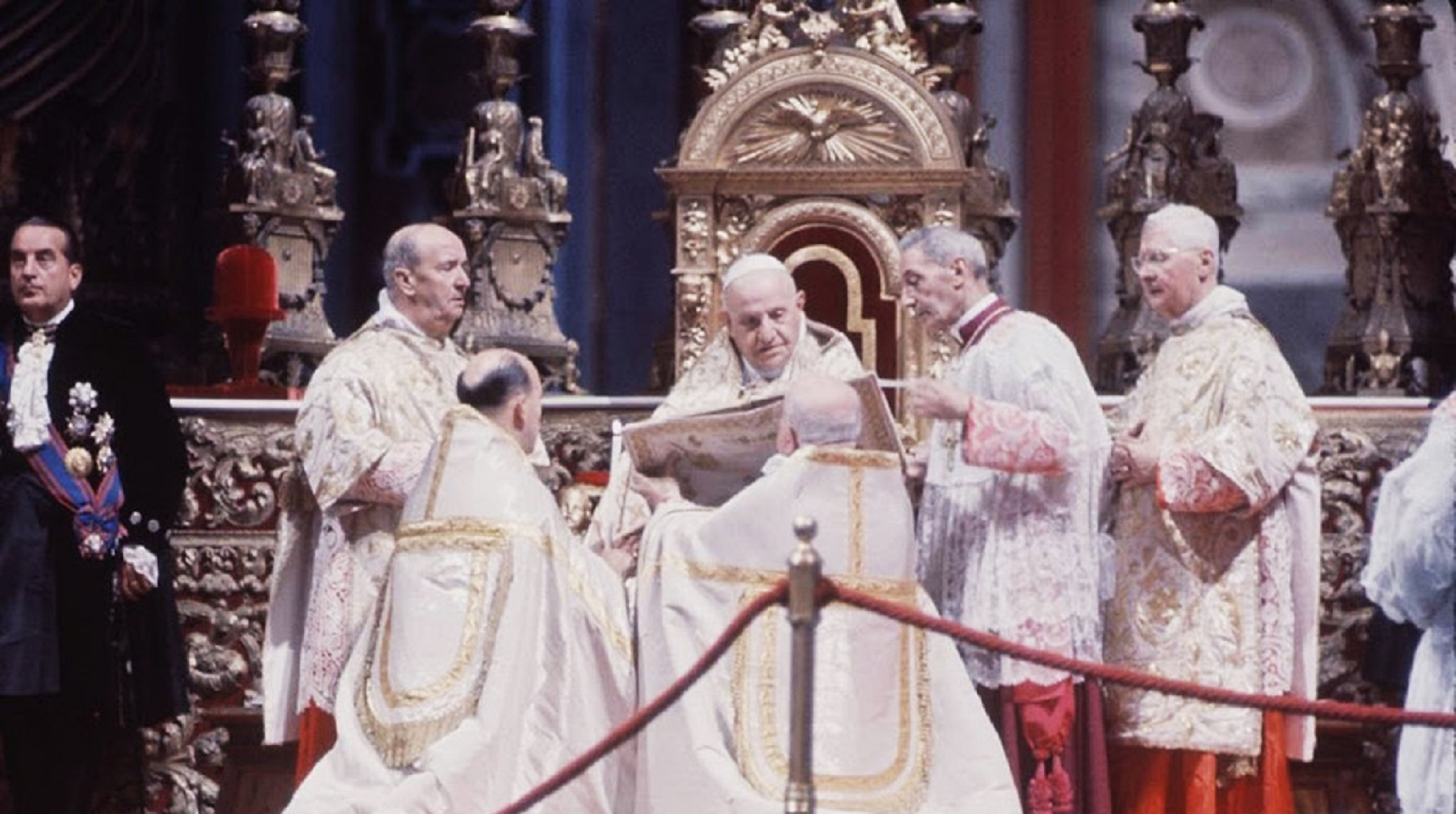
Elaborate traditional papal vestments became less common after Vatican II as simpler styles gained favour. Pictured top to bottom are Pope Paul VI, Pope John XXIII, and Pope Francis (Note: A slight exception to this was Pope Benedict XVI)

Paul VI concelebrating Mass with 24 prelates at the opening of the third session of Vatican II, 14 September 1964, alluding to the wider restoration of concelebration under the postconciliar reform he oversaw

The changes ordinary Catholics actually experienced in the pews were only loosely dictated by the council's own text. Sacrosanctum Concilium permitted, but did not require, the vernacular, and said nothing at all about the priest facing the congregation, about standing rather than kneeling to receive Communion, or about removing altar rails; each of these became widespread only through implementing decisions taken in the two years after the constitution was approved.

The vernacular spread in stages set nationally rather than by a single worldwide date. In the United States, the bishops' conference decided in April 1964 how far English would be used and had the decision confirmed by Rome that May; the vernacular took effect there on the First Sunday of Advent, 29 November 1964, a change contemporary diocesan papers such as The Criterion of Indianapolis announced on their front pages under headlines like "'New' Mass Liturgy to Begin This Sunday." Other countries moved on their own timetables: the Irish bishops issued a pastoral statement on the change on 8 November 1964, but the first vernacular Masses were not celebrated in Ireland until 7 March 1965. The instruction Inter Oecumenici, issued by the Sacred Congregation of Rites on 26 September 1964 to implement the constitution, was the source of several practices popularly associated with the council even though the constitution itself never mentioned them: it recommended, without making obligatory, that new altars be built free-standing so that Mass could be celebrated versus populum, facing the congregation, rather than ad orientem, the traditional orientation shared by priest and people. Because the instruction applied only to new or renovated altars and only recommended rather than required the change, older churches were not obliged to alter existing sanctuaries, though in practice a great many did so over the following decade.

Two further changes are often run together but had distinct histories. Standing to receive Communion, and the parallel removal of altar rails, spread in the same period as the vernacular and facing-the-people changes and, like them, rested on national and diocesan implementation rather than on any single conciliar or papal mandate. Communion in the hand followed a different and later path. The practice began spreading informally in a handful of Western European countries, the Netherlands, Belgium, France, and Germany foremost among them--in the years immediately following the council, without prior authorisation from Rome. Concerned by the trend, Paul VI in 1968 asked the world's bishops for their views and a clear majority favoured retaining the traditional practice of Communion on the tongue. The Congregation for Divine Worship's instruction Memoriale Domini, issued 29 May 1969, accordingly reaffirmed reception on the tongue as the norm for the whole Latin Church, while allowing that where the newer practice had already become established, an episcopal conference could petition Rome for permission, subject to a two-thirds vote of its own members and to safeguards spelled out in an accompanying instruction, En réponse à la demande. Such permissions, known as indults, followed quickly in the countries where the practice was already widespread--Belgium at the end of May 1969, France and Germany that June, the Netherlands and Bolivia that autumn, Canada the following year--while other episcopal conferences declined to request one, so that reception on the tongue has continued as the sole authorised practice in some parts of the Latin Church down to the present. None of this applied to the Eastern Catholic Churches, whose own eucharistic discipline was not addressed by these Latin-Church instructions.

The liturgical books themselves were revised more slowly than the earliest changes in practice might suggest. After the work of the Consilium made the Novus Ordo Missae, Paul VI promulgated the reformed Roman Missal by the apostolic constitution Missale Romanum on Holy Thursday, 3 April 1969, adding three new Eucharistic Prayers alongside the traditional Roman Canon--the first departure from a single, invariable eucharistic prayer that the Roman rite had maintained for some fifteen centuries—along with an expanded set of prefaces; the revised order of Mass took effect on the First Sunday of Advent, 30 November 1969, though the full Latin text of the new Missal itself was not published until the following year. A companion reform, the Ordo Lectionum Missae, replaced the single one-year cycle of Mass readings used before the council with a three-year cycle of Sunday readings and a two-year cycle for weekdays, substantially increasing the proportion of the Bible read aloud at Mass over time. The same reforms extended the occasions on which lay Catholics could receive Communion under both the consecrated bread and wine, a practice that had been reserved to the clergy in the ordinary Latin-rite Mass since the late Middle Ages, though Communion under both species at every Mass did not become general practice even afterward.

== Reception and interpretation ==
The council's effects have been grouped into three broad categories:

- Shifts in emphasis running through several documents at once
- Specific textual departures from earlier teaching
- Practical changes requiring new institutions or new habits

Among the shifts identified as most consequential are the description of the Catholic Church as the People of God, a renewed prominence for scripture, an acknowledgment of legitimate diversity within the Church, and a changed understanding of other Christians as standing in real, if incomplete, communion with Catholics rather than simply being outside the Catholic Church altogether. Among the specific textual departures, Hastings points to the teaching on episcopal collegiality, the statement that the Church of Christ "subsists in" the Catholic Church rather than being simply identical with it (LG 8), the recognition of a universal right to religious freedom (DH 2), the condemnation of antisemitism (NA 4), and the condemnation of weapons of mass destruction used against civilian populations (GS 80). Practical changes included vernacular worship, the wider restoration of Communion under both kinds, the revival of the permanent diaconate as an order open to married men, and the growth of national and regional episcopal conferences as a normal feature of Church governance.

In a December 2005 address to the Roman Curia, Pope Benedict XVI proposed that the council be read through what he called a "hermeneutic of reform," combining continuity with renewal, and warned against a "hermeneutic of discontinuity and rupture" that treated Vatican II as a rupture with everything that preceded it. The address has itself become a point of reference in the wider scholarly dispute over how to read the council rather than a resolution of it: a study of the interpretive debate situates Benedict's 2005 remarks as one intervention among several competing schools, organised loosely around whether the council marked continuity or rupture with prior Catholic teaching, and around whether the council is best understood through its final texts or as an open-ended historical "event" in Komonchak's sense.

== Controversies ==
=== Validity of the council ===
The most organised rejection of the council's authority has come from the Society of Saint Pius X (SSPX), a traditionalist Catholic society founded in 1970 by Archbishop Marcel Lefebvre, which holds that Nostra aetate, Unitatis redintegratio, and Dignitatis humanae in particular cannot be reconciled with earlier Catholic teaching. The Apostolic See excommunicated Lefebvre in 1988 after consecrating four bishops without papal approval; in 2009 Pope Benedict XVI lifted the excommunications of the surviving bishops he had consecrated, while stating plainly that the SSPX held no canonical status in the Catholic Church and that its ministers did not exercise a legitimate public ministry. In 2026, the SSPX had only two active bishops, both almost 70 years old. Despite a personal letter from Pope Leo XIV pleading with the society to "turn back," the SSPX consecrated four more bishops at its seminary in Écône, Switzerland, without papal approval, resulting in the Dicastery for the Doctrine of the Faith declaring the bishops involved in it, the priests of the SSPX, and any laity who "formally adhere" to the SSPX were all to be excommunicated as schismatics. The SSPX disputes these excommunications.

Separately from the SSPX, some Catholics reject the legitimacy of the popes who have governed the church since the council altogether. Sedevacantists generally assert that the papal see has been vacant since the death of Pius XII or of John XXIII. To rectify this, a subset of sedevecantists have elected their own popes, the largest of these groups being the Palmarian Catholic Church. Sedeprivationists instead hold that the men elected since then have been validly elected popes materially but not formally, and lack full papal authority until the moment they repudiate the alledged heresies of the Second Vatican Council, all without the see being simply empty.

=== Doctrinal weight of the council's teaching ===
Because Vatican II issued no dogmatic definitions or anathemas of the kind associated with some earlier councils, the doctrinal weight of its teaching has itself been debated. Paul VI addressed the question in a general audience on 12 January 1966, stating that although the council had avoided extraordinary definitions, its teaching belonged to the ordinary magisterium of the church and was to be received by the faithful with sincere assent. The 1983 Code of Canon Law codifies a form of this obligation: canon 752 requires Catholics to give "religious submission of intellect and will" to teachings the pope or the college of bishops propose on faith or morals even when not defined by a formally definitive act.

=== "Spirit of Vatican II" ===
The phrase "spirit of Vatican II" describes readings of the council that emphasise its broader aims over the literal wording of its texts. The phrase has been invoked to support positions well beyond anything the council's documents actually state, which has made it a target for critics who argue that appeals to the council's "spirit" have sometimes served to license changes the bishops never approved. A survey of the interpretive debate traces much of this dispute back to the same underlying disagreement between reading the council as a fixed set of texts and reading it, in Komonchak's sense, as an unfinished event whose consequences are still unfolding.

=== Ecumenical and interreligious disputes ===
The documents most contested by traditionalist critics are the same three the SSPX names in rejecting the council's authority: Nostra aetate, on relations with non-Christian religions; Unitatis redintegratio, on ecumenism; and Dignitatis humanae, on religious freedom. Their critics argue these documents departed from earlier, more restrictive Catholic formulations; their defenders reply that all three developed rather than abandoned Catholic doctrine, extending earlier papal teaching on human dignity and conscience into new circumstances rather than contradicting it.

== Legacy ==
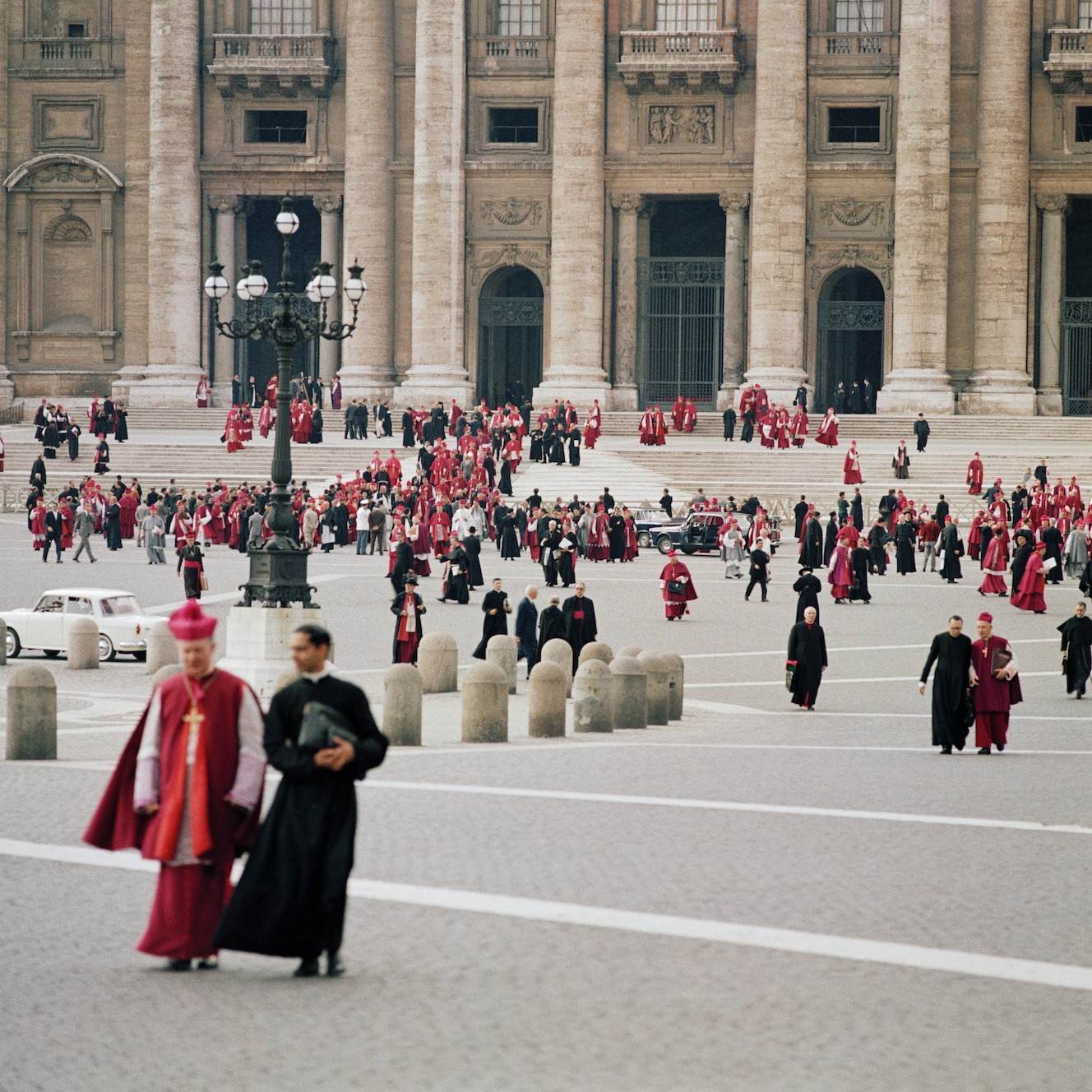
Council Fathers and their assistants leaving St. Peter's Basilica

=== Council participants who later became pope ===
Four participants in the council were later elected pope: Cardinal Giovanni Battista Montini, who as a council father became Pope Paul VI shortly after the first session; the young auxiliary bishop of Vittorio Veneto Albino Luciani, later Pope John Paul I; Bishop Karol Wojtyła of Kraków, later Pope John Paul II; and the peritus Joseph Ratzinger, later Pope Benedict XVI.

=== Saints and causes associated with the council ===
Several people connected with the council have since been canonised or beatified. John XXIII and John Paul II were canonised Saints in 2014 by Pope Francis; Pope Paul VI was canonised by Francis in 2018; Pope John Paul I was beatified by Francis in 2022, and Fulton J. Sheen was beatified in 2026, on orders of Pope Leo XIV. Other figures connected to the council whose causes have been opened or advanced include the auditor Frank Duff and the council fathers, Terence Cooke, and Gregorio Pietro Agagianian.

== See also ==
- Consilium ad exsequendam Constitutionem de Sacra Liturgia -- the special commission who implemented Sacrosanctum Concilium into the Novus Ordo Missae
- Preconciliar rites after the Second Vatican Council
- History of the Catholic Church (1962–present)
- Hermeneutics of the Second Vatican Council
