= Nouvelle théologie =

Catholic school of thought

The Nouvelle théologie (English: New Theology) is an intellectual movement in Catholic theology that arose in the mid-20th century. It is best known for Pope John XXIII's endorsement of its closely associated ressourcement (French for return to the sources) idea, which shaped the events of the Second Vatican Council. It existed most notably among certain circles of French and German theologians.

The nouveaux théologiens (new theologians) sought "a spiritual and intellectual communion with Christianity in its most vital moments as transmitted to us in its classic texts, a communion which would nourish, invigorate, and rejuvenate twentieth-century Catholicism." Many of the theologians associated with the movement advocated for a far broader "return to the sources" of the Christian faith: namely, Scripture and the writings of the Church Fathers. They also developed a renewed interest in particulars of biblical exegesis, typology, art, literature, and mysticism.

== Origins ==
Following the promulgation of the encyclical Aeterni Patris by Pope Leo XIII in 1879, Catholic theology became dominated by neo-scholasticism. During the reign of Pope Pius X, neo-scholasticism became increasingly defined in opposition to Modernism: in 1914 Pius X ordered the publication of a list of 24 philosophical propositions, propositions summarising the central tenets of neo-scholasticism to be taught in all colleges as fundamental elements of philosophy.

The roots of questioning such neo-scholastic dominance may be traced to theologians working from the 1920s onwards. While some French Jesuit studies conducted in exile at Ore Place, Hastings, England, in the years 1906–1926 have been seen by some as forerunners of the nouvelle théologie, the nouvelle théologie movement itself is generally associated with the period between 1935 and 1960. In its early stages (i.e. the 1930s and early 1940s) the movement is also particularly associated with the French language, in part contrast with the Latin used in seminary teaching at the time.

== Ideas ==
Although lumped together as a set by their opponents, the theologians associated with the nouvelle théologie had a great range of interests, views, and methodologies, and were not themselves a co-ordinated group. In later writing, Yves Congar, Henri de Lubac and Henri Bouillard all denied that the nouvelle théologie was anything but a construct of its opponents. However, subsequent studies of the movement have suggested that there did exist a set of shared characteristics among writers of the nouvelle théologie. These include:

- A tendency to ascribe a worthy place to history within the theological endeavour.
- The appeal of a positive theology.
- A critical attitude towards neo-scholasticism.

== Relationship with Church authorities ==
=== Criticism and persecution ===
The developing movement received criticisms in the late 1940s and 1950s. A first attack was made by the influential Dominican theologian Réginald Garrigou-Lagrange OP in a polemical 1946 article in the journal Angelicum. While the theologians of the movement generally preferred to call their movement a ressourcement, based on their return to original patristic thought, Garrigou-Lagrange claimed that they did not "return to the sources" but deviated from the long-standing theological tradition of the Catholic Church, thus creating a "new theology" all their own which, he claimed, was essentially Modernism in disguise. Although another writer, Pietro Parente, had used the term "teologia nuova" in a 1942 article on L'Osservatore Romano, it was from Garrigou-Lagrange's article that the label entered into widespread use. (Note: The label had first been used in 1942 by Pietro Parente in an article in L'Osservatore Romano, but it acquired widest recognition as a result of a 1946 attack on the movement by the Dominican theologian Reginald Garrigou-Lagrange. See Boersma 2009, p. 8. Over time, as nouvelle théologie has gained widespread usage, the debate over the movement's proper name has largely become a marginal note.)

In 1950, Pope Pius XII published the encyclical Humani generis, in which he condemned "certain new intellectual currents" in the Church, accusing them of relativism and attacking them for reformulating dogmas in a way that was not consistent with Church tradition and for following biblical hermeneutics that deviated from the teachings of the encyclicals Providentissimus Deus, Spiritus Paraclitus and Divino afflante Spiritu; Pius XII also admonished that such currents were trying to revive the modernist heresy, which had been strongly condemned by Pius X in his 1907 encyclical Pascendi Dominici gregis.

The encyclical did not mention any particular theologian but was widely interpreted as a condemnation of the Nouvelle théologie and was followed by an extensive purge in Le Saulchoir and Fourvière. The broader impact of Humani Generis was a freezing of systematic theology into a Thomist orthodoxy represented by the "twenty-four theses" of Pius X. Some parts of the encyclicals Mystici Corporis Christi (1943) and Mediator Dei (1947) have also been considered to be a condemnation of the Nouvelle théologie.

=== Rehabilitation ===
Following the election of Pope John XXIII and the calling of the Second Vatican Council, anti-modernist polemics declined and many theologians associated with the Nouvelle théologie were gradually rehabilitated and many of them took part in the council with the qualification of peritus.

Following the council, the more conservative supporters of Nouvelle théologie had important careers in the Church: Hans Urs von Balthasar, Jean Daniélou SJ, Yves Congar OP and Henri de Lubac SJ were made cardinals by Pope John Paul II, while Joseph Ratzinger was elected as Pope Benedict XVI in 2005. The same could not be said for the more liberal members, who were gradually marginalised due to their extreme views: Hans Küng was stripped from his theological license by the Congregation for the Doctrine of the Faith in 1979 for questioning papal infallibility, while Edward Schillebeeckx OP was repeatedly condemned by the Congregation and even by Pope Paul VI himself (encyclical Mysterium fidei) due to his heterodox views about Christology and the eucharist.

The 1993 encyclical Veritatis splendor of Pope John Paul II softened the stance of Aeterni Patris and Humani generis, stating that, although the thought of St. Thomas took precedence, other avenues could be explored for the good of the Church.

== See also ==
- Ad fontes, a Latin phrase meaning "to the sources" used by Renaissance humanists
