= Marie-Dominique Chenu =

French Catholic priest and theologian (1895-1990)

The Reverend Marie-Dominique Chenu OP
- Born: Marcel-Léon Chenu; 7 January 1895; Soisy-sur-Seine, France
- Died: 11 February 1990 (aged 95); Paris, France

Ecclesiastical career
- Religion: Christianity (Roman Catholic)
- Church: Latin Church
- Ordained: 1919

Academic background
- Education: Pontifical University of Saint Thomas Aquinas
- Thesis: De contemplatione (1920)
- Doctoral advisor: Reginald Garrigou-Lagrange

Academic work
- Discipline: Theology

Marie-Dominique Chenu OP (French pronunciation: [maʁi dɔminik ʃəny]; 7 January 1895 – 11 February 1990) was a Catholic theologian and one of the founders of the reformist journal Concilium. He was a member of the Dominican Order.

== Early life ==
Chenu was born on 7 January 1895 at Soisy-sur-Seine, Essonne, and grew up with the name "Marcel-Léon". His parents were bakers near Corbeil.

Chenu entered the French province of the Dominican Order in 1913, taking the name "Marie-Dominique" and studying at Le Saulchoir, then located in Belgium. With the outbreak of the First World War and the suspension of teaching at Le Saulchoir, Chenu travelled to Rome in 1914 to study at the Pontificium Collegium Internationale Angelicum, the future Angelicum. While at the Angelicum, Chenu was ordained in 1919 and completed his doctorate in theology in 1920 under the direction of Reginald Garrigou-Lagrange with a dissertation entitled "De contemplatione", which studied the meaning of contemplation in Thomas Aquinas.

== Career ==
In 1920, Chenu was appointed Professor of the History of Dogma at Le Saulchoir (and in late 1921 turned down a request from his doctoral supervisor, Garrigou-Lagrange, to return to the Angelicum as a lecturer). He began to develop his theological perspective, replacing the non-historical approach to Thomism that he had learned from Garrigou-Lagrange at the Angelicum with an historicist reading of Aquinas. At Le Saulchoir he was the teacher of the Dominicans Yves Congar and Edward Schillebeeckx.

In 1930, Chenu founded the Institut d'Etudes Médiévales de Montréal.

Chenu served as rector of Le Saulchoir from 1932 to 1942, and was therefore very involved in the move of Le Saulchoir from Belgium to Étoilles, near Paris, in 1937.

In 1937, Chenu privately published a book entitled Une école de théologie: Le Saulchoir. In February 1938 he was called to Rome to defend the book and made to sign a list of 10 propositions. Then, in February 1942, Une école de théologie was placed on the Vatican's Index of Forbidden Books because of its ideas about the role of historical studies in theology. He was removed as rector of Le Saulchoir and never taught there again. Friends helped him to get a position at the École des Hautes Études in Paris. He subsequently taught at the Sorbonne and the Institut catholique de Paris.

In the late 1940s and early 1950s he became involved, as a friar-preacher, in the nascent worker-priest movement, and its attempts to evangelize the anti-clerical industrial suburbs of Paris. Eventually, in 1953, Chenu was among the French Dominicans disciplined by the Master of their Order, Suárez, supposedly to save them from worse treatment by the Vatican. He was expelled from Paris and moved to Rouen, only being allowed to return to the Dominican convent of Saint-Jacques in Paris in June 1962.

According to Christoph F. Potworowski, for Chenu the incarnation is the means by which God acts within and on behalf of creation. Chenu was a theological advisor at the Second Vatican Council (1962–65) where he was influential in the Pastoral Constitution on the Church in the Modern World (Gaudium et spes).

== Influence ==
Chenu was a forerunner of the ressourcement in theology that preceded the reforms of Vatican II. Chenu played a large role in the reappropriation of historic theological sources that led to the nouvelle théologie. In particular he promoted the return to Thomas Aquinas as a source, but rejected 19th-century "modern scholastic" theology.

Although his book Une école de la théologie: Le Saulchoir was put on the Index librorum prohibitorum in 1942 by Pope Pius XII and the Holy Office, he was later rehabilitated and his theology embraced by the fathers of the Second Vatican Council.

Chenu can be credited with being the grandfather of the liberation theology movement, since Gustavo Gutiérrez of Peru, who wrote the first book on liberation theology, studied with Chenu at the Institut Catholique de Paris, and cites him numerous times in his ground breaking book. Gutiérrez moved to France and became a member of the same Dominican community that Chenu belonged to.

== Bibliography ==
The following titles are a selection of the works published by Chenu. (Note: A full bibliography of Chenu can be found in Potworowski 2001, pp. 237–321.)

=== Selected works ===
- De contemplatione. Thèse de doctorat Angelicum, Rome 1920. Édition par Carmelo Giuseppe CONTICELLO
- "Position de la théologie," Revue des sciences philosophiques et théologiques 24 (1935): 252 ff., rpt. as La foi dans l'intelligence in Chenu's La parole de Dieu, vol. 1, pp. 115–138
- Une école de théologie: le Saulchoir (Étiolles: Le Saulchoir, 1937; rpt. Paris: Cerf, 1985)
- La théologie comme science au XIIIe siècle (Paris, 1943; 3rd ed., Paris: Vrin, 1957)
- Introduction a l'étude de Saint Thomas d'Aquin (Montreal: Institut d'études médiévales, 1950), trans. Albert M. Landry and Dominic Hughes as Toward Understanding Saint Thomas (Chicago: Regnery, 1964)
- La théologie au douzième siècle (Paris: Vrin, 1957), selection ed. and trans. Jerome Taylor and Lester Little as Nature, Man and Society in the Twelfth Century: Essays on New Theological Perspectives in the Latin West (Chicago: U of Chicago P, 1968)
- St Thomas d'Aquin et la théologie (Paris, 1959), trans. Paul Philibert as Aquinas and His Role in Theology (Collegeville: Liturgical Press, 2002 ISBN 9780814650790)
- La Théologie est-elle une science? (Paris: Fayard, 1959), trans. A. H. N. Green-Armytage as Is Theology a Science? (New York: Hawthorn, 1959)
- Le Parole de Dieu, 2 vols. (Paris: Cerf, 1964), trans. Denis Hickey as Faith and Theology (New York: Macmillan, 1968)
- "Pour une théologie du travail" (Paris: Seuil, 1965), trans. Lilian Soiron as The Theology of Work: An Exploration (Chicago: Regnery, 1966)
- "A conversation with Père Chenu", Dominicana 50 (1965): 141 ff.
- Peuple de Dieu dans le monde (Paris: Cerf, 1966)
- Jacques Duquesne interroge le Père Chenu: un théologien en liberté (Paris, Éditions du Centurion 1975)

=== On Chenu ===
- Mélanges offerts à M.-D. Chenu (Paris: J. Vrin, 1967)
- Mary Kate Holman, Marie-Dominique Chenu: Catholic Theology for a Changing World (Notre Dame Press, 2025) ISBN 9780268209827
