= Edward Schillebeeckx =

Belgian Catholic theologian (1914–2009)

The Reverend Edward Schillebeeckx OP
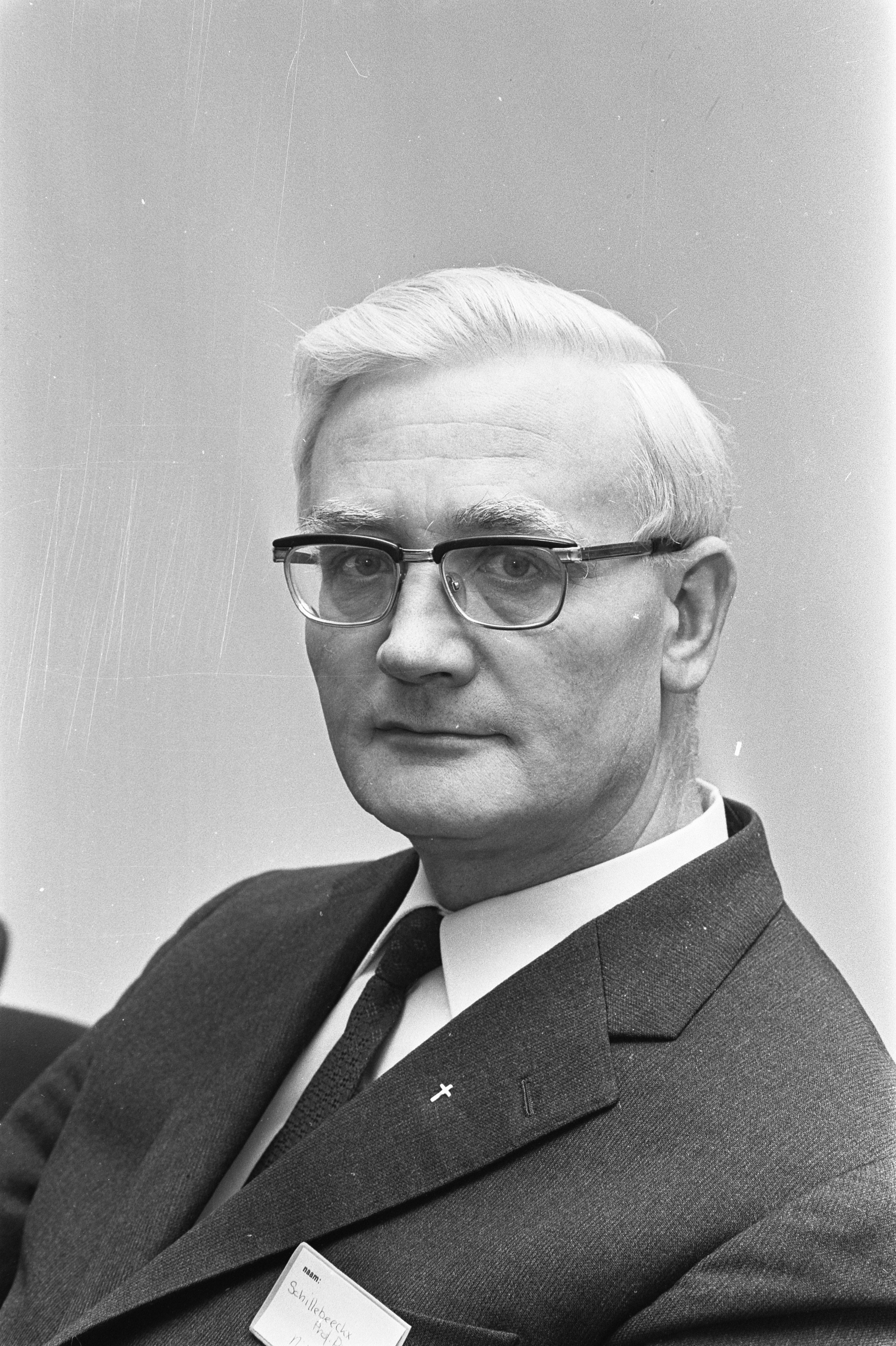
- Schillebeeckx in 1979
- Born: 12 November 1914; Antwerp, Belgium
- Died: 23 December 2009 (aged 95); Nijmegen, Netherlands
- Other name: Edward Cornelis Florentius Alfonsus Schillebeeckx
- Awards: Erasmus Prize (1982)

Ecclesiastical career
- Religion: Christianity (Roman Catholic)
- Church: Latin Church
- Ordained: 1941 (priest)

Academic background
- Education: Le Saulchoir, Catholic University of Leuven

Academic work
- Discipline: Theology
- Sub-discipline: Dogmatic theology
- Institutions: Catholic University of Nijmegen
- Notable ideas: Transignification

Edward Cornelis Florentius Alfonsus Schillebeeckx (Note: /ˈskɪləbeɪks/ SKIL-ə-bayks; Dutch pronunciation: [ˈɛtʋɑrt ˈsxɪləbeːks].) (November 12, 1914 – December 23, 2009) was a Belgian Catholic theologian born in Antwerp. He taught at the Catholic University of Nijmegen. He was a member of the Dominican Order. His books on theology have been translated into many languages, and his contributions to the Second Vatican Council made him known throughout the world.

== Early life and ordination ==
He was born in Antwerp on 12 November 1914, the sixth of 14 children in a middle-class family. After being educated by the Jesuits at Turnhout, Schillebeeckx entered the Dominican Order in 1934. He studied theology and philosophy at the Catholic University of Leuven. In 1941, he was ordained to the priesthood. In 1943 he finalized his studies in Turnhout and moved to Ghent, where he studied at the Dominican house; he was strongly influenced by Dominicus De Petter's courses in phenomenology of religion. After three years of studying philosophy at Ghent, Schillebeeckx heeded the call-up of the Belgian Armed Forces in 1938, leaving the army again in August 1939. But one and a half months after that he was summoned to return due to the start of World War II and he left the Army only after the defeat of the Belgian Armed Forces by the German occupiers. Schillebeeckx then entered the Dominican study house at Leuven, where he stayed until 1945. From that year to July 1946, he studied at the Dominican study centre Le Saulchoir at Étiolles, near Paris, where representatives of the nouvelle théologie movement such as Marie-Dominique Chenu and Yves Congar introduced him to modern Catholic theology as well as to the thought of neo-Calvinist theologian Karl Barth.

== Doctoral thesis ==
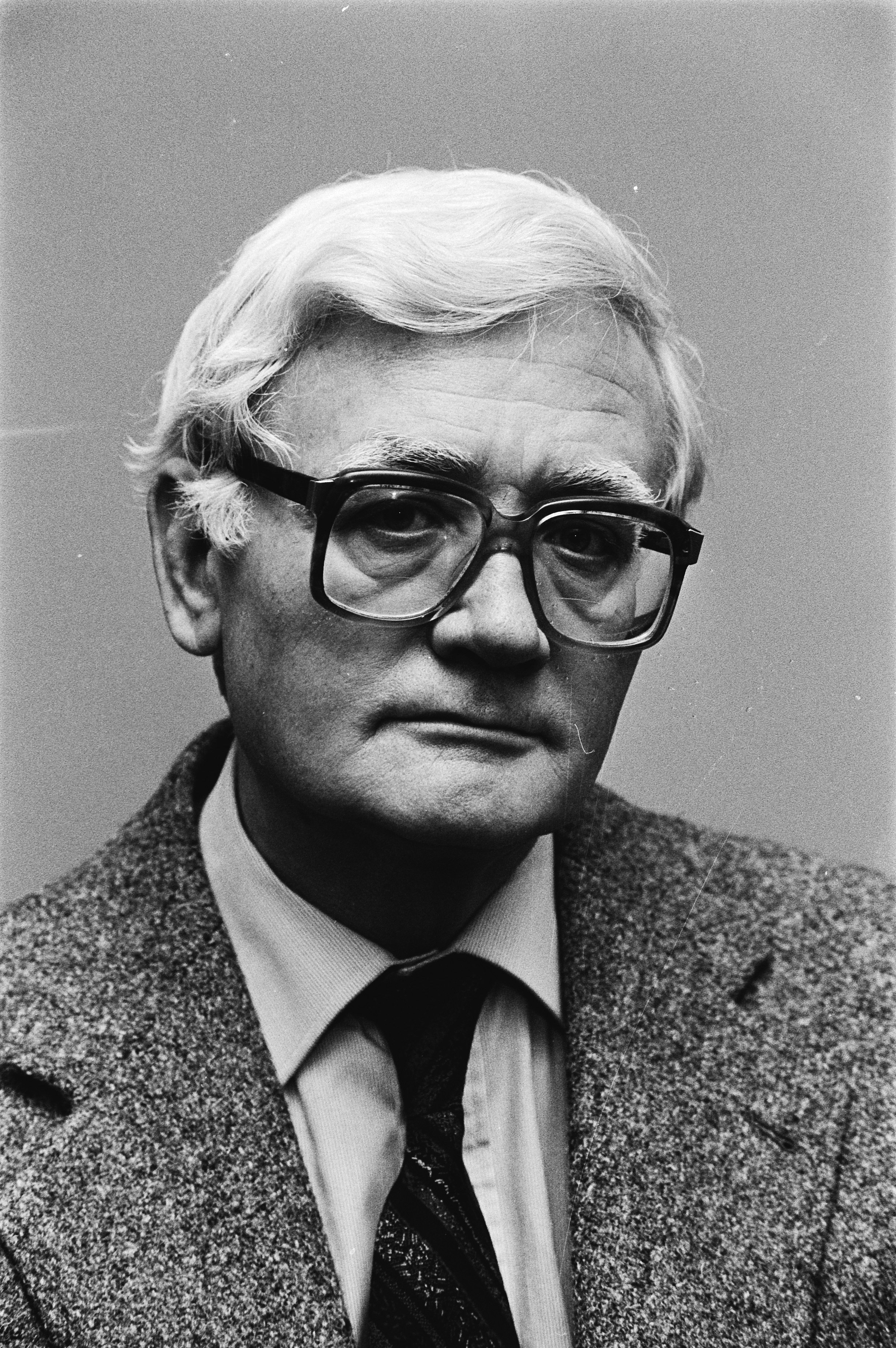

During these years he also studied at the Sorbonne, and in July 1946 he did his doctoral exam at the École des hautes études. In 1952 he defended and published his doctoral thesis at the Dominican school of theology Le Saulchoir: De sacramentele heilseconomie [The redeeming economy of the sacraments]. After that, Schillebeeckx became master of the Philosophy Study House of his order in Leuven, and in 1957 he spent one year teaching dogmatics at the Faculty of Theology, Catholic University of Leuven. In 1958 the Catholic University of Nijmegen in the Netherlands made him a professor of dogmatic theology and history of theology. His inaugural lecture Op zoek naar de levende God [In Search of the Living God] introduced Dutch theologians to the nouvelle théologie founded by Chenu, Congar, Hans Urs von Balthasar, and others.

== Second Vatican Council ==
During the Second Vatican Council, Schillebeeckx was one of the most active theologians. He drafted various council interventions for Dutch bishops such as Cardinal Bernard Jan Alfrink, and gave conferences on theological ressourcement for many episcopal conferences present in Rome.

Due to his having been the "ghost writer" of the Dutch bishops' Pastoral Letter on the upcoming Council in 1961, he was rendered suspect with the Congregation of the Holy Office, led by Cardinal Alfredo Ottaviani (President) and the Dutchman Sebastiaan Tromp (Secretary). This was the first of three instances in which Schillebeeckx had to defend his theological positions against accusations from the Roman authorities.

As a result, Schillebeeckx drafted anonymously his mostly negative comments on the schemata prepared by the Preparatory Theological Commission, headed by Ottaviani. These anonymous comments on the theological schemata debated at Vatican II, and the articles he published, also influenced the development of several conciliar constitutions such as Dei verbum and Lumen gentium. Concerning the latter document, the Dogmatic Constitution on the Church, Schillebeeckx was mainly involved in the debate on episcopal collegiality, attempting to move Catholic ecclesiology away from a purely hierarchical, structured vision of the church, which he thought was focused too heavily on papal authority (as a result of the declaration of papal infallibility in Vatican I's constitution Pastor aeternus). This, according to Schillebeeckx and many others at Vatican II, was to be balanced by a renewed stress on the role of the episcopal college.

In this way, his influence was far greater than that of a formal peritus, a status the Dutch bishops had not granted to him. Not being a peritus also allowed him more time to give talks to the bishops attending the council, and to explain to them the "new theology" or understanding arising with the council.

Already in 1963, together with Chenu, Congar, Karl Rahner, and Hans Küng, he was involved in preparing the rise of the new theological journal Concilium, which was officially founded in 1965 with the support of Paul Brand and Antoine Van den Boogaard, and which promoted "reformist" thought.

== Exegesis ==
In the post-conciliar period Schillebeeckx's attention shifted somewhat from Thomism to biblical exegesis. He saw neo-scholastic theology that reacted against modern ideas as poorly founded in Aquinas's writings or their medieval context. He portrayed sacraments less abstractly, like the personal encounters Jesus had with his followers, rather than as mechanisms for the distribution of grace. He became widely known through the English translation in 1963 of his book Christ the Sacrament of the Encounter with God. On the basis of his study of the earliest Christian sources – often drawing upon the exegetical insight of his Nijmegen colleague Bas van Iersel – Schillebeeckx confronted such debated questions as the position of priests, e.g., by supporting a proposal to disconnect sacramental priesthood and the obligation to celibacy. Precisely on this matter, Schillebeeckx played an influential role during the National Pastoral Council (Landelijk Pastoraal Concilie) held at Noordwijkerhout from 1968 to 1970. At the sessions of this synod, the Dutch bishops, intellectuals, and representatives from many Catholic organisations tried to implement what they perceived as the major progressive objectives of the Second Vatican Council. Schillebeeckx, well known in the Netherlands and Belgium through his many interventions in the media, was by then known as the leading Dutch-speaking contemporary theologian.

== Controversies with the CDF ==
In Jesus: An Experiment in Christology (Dutch ed. 1974), Schillebeeckx argued that we should not imagine that the belief of the disciples that Jesus had risen was caused by the empty tomb and the resurrection appearances. He proposed instead that a belief in the resurrection, "that the new orientation of living which this Jesus has brought about in their lives has not been rendered meaningless by his death – quite the opposite," gave rise to these traditions. The empty tomb was, in his opinion, an unnecessary hypothesis, since "an eschatological, bodily resurrection, theologically speaking, has nothing to do, however, with a corpse." That was merely a "crude and naive realism of what 'appearances of Jesus'" meant.

Although the books were followed by a couple of articles where Schillebeeckx defends himself against criticism and tones down his radicalism, on 20 October 1976 the Congregation for the Doctrine of the Faith wrote to him with various objections. As a result of the ensuing correspondence, he was asked to come to Rome to explain his position. In December 1979, he met with representatives of the congregation. Due to international pressure, the drive for a trial was ended. The conclusions of the congregation, however, left the impression that a genuine accord had not been reached, and he continued to receive notifications from Church authorities for his repeated writings. His christology was criticized by Cardinal Franjo Šeper and then-Cardinal Joseph Ratzinger, whom Schillebeeckx already knew at the Second Vatican Council and who was later elected Pope Benedict XVI.

In 1984 his orthodoxy was again called into question by the Congregation for the Doctrine of the Faith: he was summoned to Rome to explain his views expressed in The Ministry in the Church, which were regarded as Protestant. And in 1986 for a third time Schillebeeckx's theological views were put into question, again regarding the sacramental nature of office in the Catholic Church. More precisely, in The Church with a Human Face Schillebeeckx argued, on biblical-historical grounds, that the consecration to Catholic priesthood does not necessarily gain its validity from, and can therefore be detached from, apostolic succession; rather, the choice of priests (and as a consequence the celebration of the Eucharist) is dependent on the local church community.

Despite three investigations with the Congregation for the Doctrine of the Faith, the writings of Schillebeeckx were never condemned. Some of his doctrines, however, have been implicitly or even explicitly rejected by the Magisterium of the Catholic Church; most notably his theory of transignification, which elaborated upon the Catholic doctrine of transsubstantiation (in Pope Paul VI's 1965 encyclical Mysterium fidei).

Schillebeeckx continued to publish after his retirement. His oeuvre, surveyed in several bibliographies, has been the subject of many studies and controversies.

== Later life ==
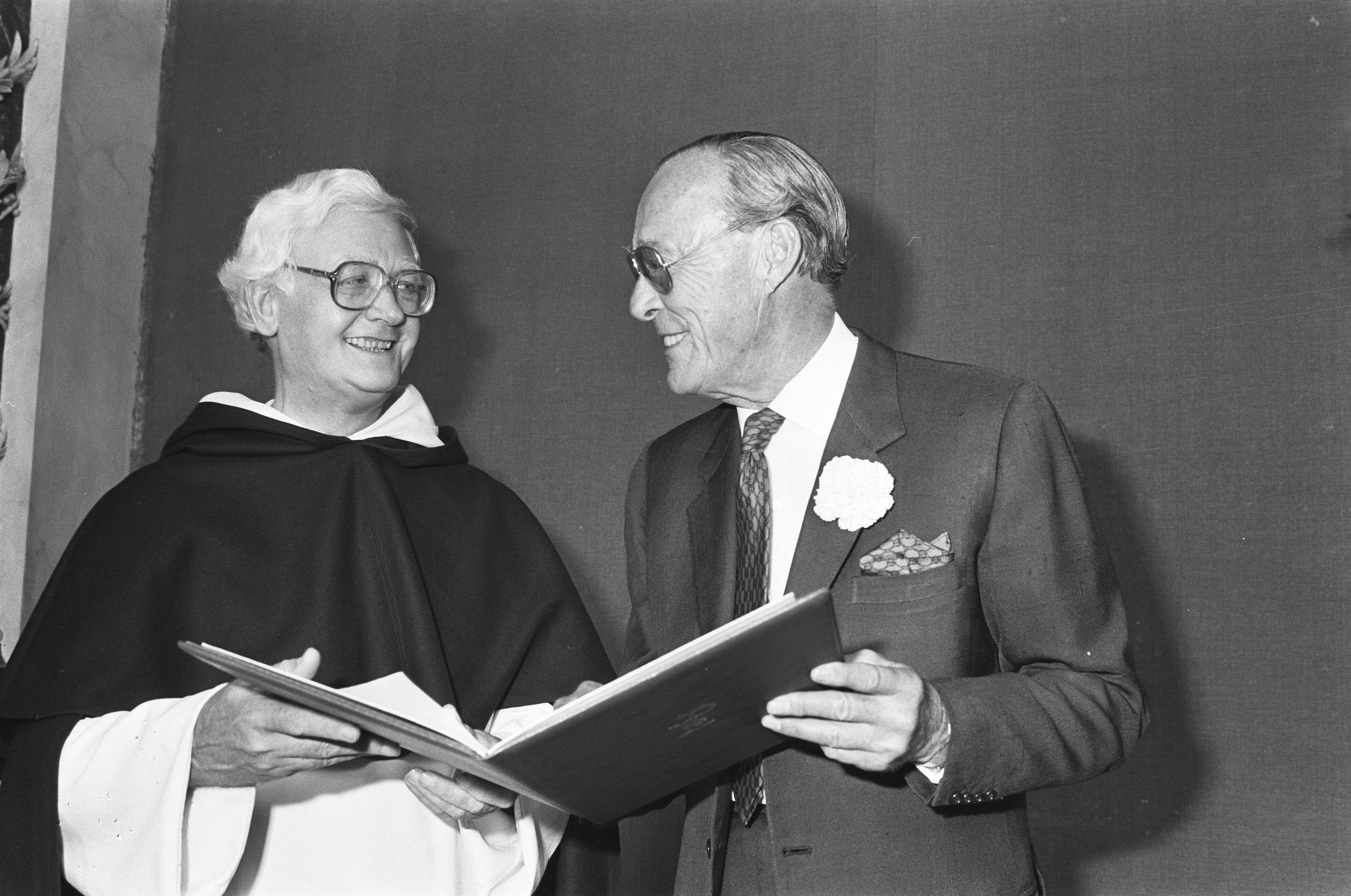
Schillebeeckx with the Erasmus Prize and prince Bernhard

Until his death he lived in Nijmegen, in the Netherlands, where he taught at the Catholic University of Nijmegen until his retirement. He was awarded the Erasmus Prize in 1982, and (as the only theologian) the Gouden Ganzenveer in 1989. He died on 23 December 2009.

== Resources ==
=== Selective bibliography ===
- De sacramentele heilseconomie (Antwerp 1952)
- Christus, sacrament van de Godsontmoeting (Bilthoven 1959) – tr. Christ the sacrament of the encounter with God (New York 1963)
- Op zoek naar de levende God (Nimwegen 1959)
- Openbaring en theologie (Bilthoven 1964) (Theologische Peilingen, 1) – tr. Revelation and theology (London 1979)
- God en mens (Bilthoven 1965) (Theologische Peilingen, 2)
- Wereld en kerk (Bilthoven 1966) (Theologische Peilingen, 3)
- De zending van de kerk (Bilthoven 1968) (Theologische Peilingen, 4)
- Jezus, het verhaal van een levende (Bloemendaal 1974) – tr. Jesus: an experiment in Christology (London 1979; New York 1981)
- Gerechtigheid en liefde, genade en bevrijding (Bloemendaal 1977) – tr. Christ: the Christian experience in the modern world (London 1980)
- Tussentijds verhaal over twee Jezusboeken (Baarn 1978)
- Evangelie verhalen (Baarn 1982) – tr. God among us : the Gospel proclaimed (London 1983)
- Pleidooi voor mensen in de kerk. Christelijke identiteit en ambten in de kerk (Baarn 1985) – tr. The Church with a human face: a new and expanded theology of ministry (New York 1985)
- Als politiek niet alles is... Jezus in de westerse cultuur (Baarn 1986) – tr. On Christian faith: the spiritual, ethical and political dimensions (New York 1984)
- Mensen als verhaal van God (Baarn 1989) – tr. Church. The human story of God (New York 1990)
- I Am a Happy Theologian (London 1994)
- The Eucharist (2005/1948)

=== Bio-bibliographical literature ===
- Erik Borgman, Edward Schillebeeckx. A Theologian in His History. Vol. 1: A Catholic Theology of Culture (London, New York NY, 2003).
- Bibliography of Edward Schillebeeckx 1936-1996. Compiled by Ted Schoof and Jan Van de Westelaken (Baarn, 1997).
- The Schillebeeckx Case. Official Exchange of Letters and Documents in the Investigation of Fr. Edward Schillebeeckx by the Sacred Congregation for the Doctrine of the Faith, 1976-1980. Edited with introduction and notes by Ted Schoof (New York NY, 1980).
- Jennifer Cooper, Humanity in the Mystery of God: the theological anthropology of Edward Schillebeeckx. (London, T&T Clark, 2011).

=== Edward Schillebeeckx Foundation ===
The Edward Schillebeeckx Foundation, led by Erik Borgman, was founded at Nijmegen in 1989. As indicated on its website, the foundation sets itself the goal of collecting, organising, preserving, and rendering accessible the entire output of, and material about, Edward Schillebeeckx. The Foundation seeks to safeguard for the future the spiritual, scientific, and social values contained in Schillebeeckx' work. The Foundation has created an endowed Edward Schillebeeckx Chair at the Radboud University Nijmegen, which is currently held by Prof. Stephan van Erp.

=== Archives ===
The personal papers of Edward Schillebeeckx are being conserved in two archive centers. The largest part of the collection of Schillebeeckx' writings are kept at the Katholiek Documentatie Centrum (KDC) of the Radboud University at Nijmegen (not consultable). As regards the council papers of Edward Schillebeeckx, these are held at the Centre for the Study of the Second Vatican Council, at the Faculty of Theology, Catholic University of Leuven.
