= Eucharistic credo =

The Eucharistic Credo (credo, comes from the Latin word meaning "I believe") is a profession of faith in the Real Presence of Jesus in the sacramental Eucharistic elements written in 1078 by Pope Gregory VII (Latin: Gregorius VII; c. 1015 – 25 May 1085).

Until the eleventh century, there is no record of a Christian theologian challenging the belief in the Real Presence, that is, the physical, personal reality of Jesus in the Eucharistic elements (the bread and wine believed to become the body and blood of Jesus).

The first known challenge comes from Berengarius of Tours. Drawing upon the writings of Ratramnus of the ninth century who considered Jesus spiritually present in the Eucharist, Berengarius denied that the historical Jesus, born of the Virgin Mary was present in the Eucharistic elements. His teaching on the subject became known throughout Europe by around 1047. His position was condemned subsequently by several regional councils including Rome (1050), Verecelli (1050) where for reasons unclear he was imprisoned briefly by the King, Tours (1055), Rome (1059), Poitiers (1075), and St. Maixeut (1076).

While Berengarius had signed several vague retractions, it was when summoned to the Council in Rome by Pope Gregory VII in 1078 that he was given the historically famous credo to affirm publicly. As a result, Berengarius was condemned by the council with the Pope's consent. This credo has been considered by theologians through the centuries as the first succinct doctrinal definition by the Church on the Eucharist. It is credited with crystallizing the ancient teachings of the Church on the Eucharist and ushering in the "Eucharistic Renaissance" of the High Middle Ages typified by a flourishing of various Eucharistic devotions.

== Text of the Credo ==
The text of Gregory VII's Credo was quoted in it entirety in Pope Paul VI's encyclical letter, Mysterium fidei, published on September 3, 1965.

"I believe in my heart and openly profess that the bread and wine placed upon the altar are, by the mystery of the sacred prayer and the words of the Redeemer, substantially changed into the true and life-giving flesh and blood of Jesus Christ our Lord, and that after the consecration, there is present the true body of Christ which was born of the Virgin and offered up for the salvation of the world, hung on the cross and now sits at the right hand of the Father, and that there is present the true blood of Christ which flowed from his side. They are present not only by means of a sign and of the efficacy of the Sacrament, but also in the very reality and truth of their nature and substance".
