= Stephan van Erp =

Dutch Catholic theologian (1966-)

- Born: October 6, 1966; Tilburg, Netherlands
- Occupation: Theologian

Academic background
- Education: Catholic University of Nijmegen; University of Oxford; Tilburg University
- Doctoral advisor: John Webster

Academic work
- Discipline: Catholic theology
- Sub-discipline: Philosophical theology; fundamental theology
- Institutions: Catholic University of Leuven; Australian Catholic University; University of Oxford; King's College London

Stephan van Erp (born 6 October 1966), is a Dutch Catholic theologian and philosopher who serves as professor of fundamental theology and holds the Ladies of Bethany Chair at KU Leuven, and is a professorial fellow at the Institute for Religion and Critical Inquiry at Australian Catholic University He is also Senior Research Associate of the Von Hügel Institute at St. Edmund's College of the University of Cambridge. Recognized as a leading scholar of Edward Schillebeeckx, van Erp has contributed to contemporary fundamental theology through his work on theological aesthetics, political theology, and Vatican II reception.

== Education and career ==
Van Erp studied theology at the Theological Faculty of Tilburg and the University of Oxford, and philosophy at the Catholic University of Nijmegen. His doctoral dissertation, completed at Tilburg, examined the theological aesthetics of Swiss theologian Hans Urs von Balthasar (1905–1988). Published in 2004 as The Art of Theology: Hans Urs von Balthasar's Theological Aesthetics and the Foundations of Faith by Peeters Publishers, this work approached Balthasar through careful rereading of Nicholas of Cusa and Friedrich Wilhelm Joseph Schelling.

At the University of Oxford, he served as a tutor in Philosophy of Religion and Doctrine and Interpretation. He has held visiting fellowships at both Oxford and King's College London. Van Erp joined KU Leuven in January 2015 and has since chaired the Research Unit Systematic Theology and the Study of Religions from 2016 to 2024, coordinating the Research Group for Fundamental and Political Theology, and co-founding the Interfaculty Centre for Catholic Thought alongside Henning Tegtmeyer. Since November 2018, he has held the Special Chair "Edward Schillebeeckx" at Radboud University Nijmegen, where he investigates Schillebeeckx's contributions to debates concerning church and politics. Van Erp holds significant editorial responsibilities in Catholic theology, including positions at Concilium, Tijdschrift voor Theologie, Studies in Philosophical Theology (Peeters Publishers), Louvain Monographs in Theology and Religious Studies and Brill Research Perspectives in Theology.

== Theological Vision ==
Van Erp's own theological work develops an incarnational and sacramental understanding of God's presence in history and politics, continuing the trajectory of Vatican II. A central conviction is that the world itself serves as a locus theologicus—a place where theology is done. His political theology, articulated in "World and Sacrament: Foundations of the Political Theology of the Church" (Louvain Studies, 2016), proposes that the Church functions "as a sign and instrument of God's political ordering of the world towards his Kingdom," with the sacrament lying "in the heart of citizenship, in so far as it means to create a space for the other."

In De onvoltooide eeuw: Voorlopers van een katholieke cultuur (2015), van Erp offers a theological and cultural reading of twentieth-century Catholicism as an unfinished project marked not simply by decline or secularization, but by renewed sacramental engagement with modern life. Criticizing reductive sociological accounts of faith, he argues that Catholic belief is neither a private opinion nor a cultural residue, but an embodied, relational commitment oriented toward God's presence in the world. Through three exemplary faith biographies—the artist David Jones, the social activist Dorothy Day, and the theologian Edward Schillebeeckx—van Erp shows how Catholic faith took shape within war, poverty, culture, and theology as concrete participation in the mystery of divine love. Together, these figures illustrate a form of Catholic culture that neither withdraws from modernity nor assimilates to it, but sacramentally "inhabits" the world, anticipating a still-unfinished synthesis between faith, culture, and daily life.

== Scholarship ==
Van Erp is widely recognized as the leading contemporary scholar on the theology of Edward Schillebeeckx (1914–2009), the influential Flemish Dominican theologian who was among the founders of Concilium and a peritus at the Second Vatican Council. Van Erp's major contributions to Schillebeeckx scholarship include the T&T Clark Handbook of Edward Schillebeeckx (2019, co-edited with Daniel Minch), a comprehensive reference work, and the T&T Clark Reader in Edward Schillebeeckx (2023), an anthology of key texts. He also authored A Happy Theologian: A Hundred Years of Edward Schillebeeckx (2014, with Maarten van den Bos) commemorating the centenary of Schillebeeckx's birth, and edited Edward Schillebeeckx and Contemporary Theology (2010) and Trouw aan Gods toekomst: De blijvende betekenis van de theologie van Edward Schillebeeckx (2010). Van Erp serves as series editor of T&T Clark Studies in Edward Schillebeeckx (Bloomsbury Press), which has published volumes including Grace, Governance and Globalization (2017) and Salvation in the World: The Crossroads of Public Theology (2017). He interprets Schillebeeckx's legacy as emphasizing the movement from metaphysics to existence, the reception of Critical Theory and hermeneutic philosophy alongside Nouvelle Théologie, and the argument that "theology needs the dynamics of history and cannot act upon the assumption of the unifying force of metaphysics anymore."

Since 2017, van Erp has been working on a comprehensive biography of Schillebeeckx as an FWO (Flanders Research Foundation) project titled "Edward Schillebeeckx: A Theologian in His History (1965–2009)." Van Erp organizes the annual Edward Schillebeeckx Lecture, hosted by KU Leuven's Faculty of Theology and Religious Studies. Notable speakers have included Rowan Williams (2013), Terry Eagleton (2015), Tomáš Halík (2022), Eleonore Stump (2023), and Miroslav Volf (2024). He also chairs the jury of the biennial Edward Schillebeeckx Essay Prize.

== Bibliography ==
=== Authored books ===
- The Art of Theology: Hans Urs von Balthasar's Theological Aesthetics and the Foundations of Faith. Studies in Philosophical Theology, Vol. 25. Leuven: Peeters Publishers, 2004.
- A Happy Theologian: A Hundred Years of Edward Schillebeeckx (with Maarten van den Bos). Nijmegen: Valkhof Pers, 2014.
- De onvoltooide eeuw: Voorlopers van een katholieke cultuur. Nijmegen: Valkhof Pers, 2015.

=== Edited volumes ===
- Edward Schillebeeckx and Contemporary Theology (with Lieven Boeve and Frederiek Depoortere). London/New York: Continuum/T&T Clark, 2010.
- Conversion and Church: The Challenge of Renewal (with Karim Schelkens). Brill's Studies in Catholic Theology. Leiden/New York: Brill Publishers, 2016.
- Tussen Credo en Amen: Geloven als opdracht en overgave. LOGOS: Leuvense ontmoetingen rond geloof, openbaring en spiritualiteit, Vol. 11. Antwerp: Halewijn, 2016.
- Grace, Governance and Globalization (with Martin G. Poulsom and Lieven Boeve). T&T Clark Studies in Edward Schillebeeckx, Vol. 1. London/New York: Bloomsbury T&T Clark, 2017.
- Salvation in the World: The Crossroads of Public Theology (with Christiane Alpers and Christopher Cimorelli). T&T Clark Studies in Edward Schillebeeckx, Vol. 2. London/New York: Bloomsbury Press, 2017.
- Met nieuwe ogen en een nieuw hart: Religieuze dienstbaarheid in beweging. Antwerp: Halewijn, 2017.
- Het habijt weer uit de kast: Botsing of ontmoeting tussen generaties in dominicaans perspectief. Leuven: Dominicanen, 2018.
- God de levende: Essays over geloof, cultuur en politiek (texts by Edward Schillebeeckx, with introduction). Theologische klassiekers. Utrecht: KokBoekencentrum, 2019.
- Identité et visibilité: Conflits de générations chez les dominicains. Collection Spiritualité. Toulouse: Domuni Press, 2019.
- T&T Clark Handbook of Edward Schillebeeckx (with Daniel Minch). London/New York: T&T Clark, 2019.
- Theos and Polis: Political Theology as Discernment (with Jacques Haers). Leuven/Paris/Bristol: Peeters Publishers, 2023.
- In het voetspoor van de Komende: De theologie van Erik Borgman (with Anton Milh). Utrecht: KokBoekencentrum, 2024.

=== Articles and chapters ===
- "World and Sacrament: Foundations of the Political Theology of the Church." Louvain Studies 39 (2016): 102–120.
- "Seeing Christ on the Battlefield: Sign Making, Sacrament and Conversion." In Conversion and Church: The Challenge of Renewal, edited by Stephan van Erp and Karim Schelkens, 65–86. Leiden/New York: Brill Publishers, 2016.
- "Holiness in the Making: Labor and Sacrament in Twentieth Century Catholic Theology." Journal of Religious Ethics 45, no. 2 (2017): 274–286.
- "Creation, Civil Authority and Salvation: Edward Schillebeeckx's Political Theology After Vatican II" (with Daniel Minch). Archivum Fratrum Praedicatorum 3 (2018): 293–316.
- "Kenosis, Unity, and Kingdom: Christology and Ecclesial Renewal at Vatican II." In The Letter and the Spirit: On the Forgotten Documents of Vatican II, edited by Annemarie Mayer, 247–266. Bibliotheca Ephemeridum Theologicarum Lovaniensium. Leuven: Peeters, 2018.
- "Schillebeeckx's Metaphysics and Epistemology: The Influence of Dominicus De Petter" (with Dries Bosschaert). In T&T Clark Handbook of Edward Schillebeeckx, edited by Stephan van Erp and Daniel Minch, 29–44. London/New York: Bloomsbury, 2019.
- "Nulla Proportio in Concordantia: Catholic Political Theology and the Mystery of Consensus." Modern Theology 36, no. 1 (2020): 124–137.
