= Henri Bouillard =

French Jesuit theologian

Henri Bouillard (13 March 1908 – 22 June 1981) was a French Jesuit theologian.

== Life ==
Bouillard was born in Charlieu, in the Loire.

In 1941, he received his doctorate from the Pontifical Gregorian University under Charles Boyer, SJ. That same year, he joined the theology faculty at Fourvière, near Lyon, alongside Henri de Lubac. His doctorate was published in 1944 as Conversion et grâce chez saint Thomas d'Aquin. The book so emphasized the human role in conversion that it seemed to many neo-Thomists to call into question God's assistance in the process. In its placing of Thomas Aquinas' thought squarely within the history of the development of doctrine, it also seemed to the same neo-Thomists to relativise the theology of Thomas Aquinas, as well as human truth claims in general. When de Lubac's Surnaturel was published in 1946, Bouillard's book became part of a more general debate on the position of the Fourvière theologians.

In 1950, Bouillard was removed from his teaching post at Fourvière because of his connections to the strands of thought known as nouvelle théologie. In the seven years that followed, Bouillard embarked on a large study of Karl Barth. This was written as his second dissertation, at the Sorbonne, and was defended in the presence of Barth himself.

Bouillard was Professor of Fundamental Theology at the Institut Catholique in Paris. Together with Jean Daniélou, he founded the Institut de science et théologie des religions (ISTR) in 1967.

Bouillard died in Paris in 1981.

== Selected works ==
For a full bibliography, see:

- Karl H Neufeld, 'Bibliographie du P. Henri Bouillard: 1942–1981', in Henri Bouillard, Vérité du christianisme, (Paris: Desclée de Brouwer, 1989), pp357–61
- Eileen J Scully, 'Grace and Human Freedom in the Theology of Henri Bouillard', (PhD diss, University of St Michael's College, Toronto School of Theology, 1993)

French

- Conversion et grâce chez s. Thomas d'Aquin: Étude historique, Théologie 1, (Paris: Aubier, 1944)
- 'Précisions', Revue Thomiste 47, (1947), 177-83
- 'L'Idée chrétienne du miracle', Cahiers Laennec 8:4, (1948), 25-37
- Karl Barth, 2 vols, Théologie 38-39 (Paris: Aubier, 1957)
- Blondel et le christianisme, (Paris: Éditions du Seuil, 1961)
- Logique de la foi: esquisses, dialogues avec la pensée protestante, approches philosophiques, Théologie 60, (Paris: Aubier, 1964)
- Connaissance de Dieu: foi chrétienne et théologie naturelle, (Paris: Éditions Montaigne; Aubier, 1967)
- Comprendre ce que l'on croit, (Paris, 1971)
- Vérité du christianisme, Postface de Henri de Lubac, Édité par K.H. Neufeld, (Paris: Desclée de Brouwer, 1989)
- Le Mystère chrétien à l'épreuve de la raison et de la foi, préface de Mgr Rino Fisichella, (Téqui, 2001)

English translations

- The Thought of Maurice Blondel: A Synoptic Vision (1963), IPQ 3, 392-405
- The Logic of the Faith, (New York: Sheed and Ward, 1967)
- The Knowledge of God, trans Samuel D Femiano, (New York: Herder and Herder, 1968)
- Blondel and Christianity, trans James M Somerville, (Washington, DC: Corpus, 1969)
