= Ad fontes =

Latin phrase

Ad fontes is a Latin expression that means "[back] to the sources" (lit. 'to the sources'). The phrase epitomizes the renewed study of Greek and Latin classics in Renaissance humanism, subsequently extended to Biblical texts. The idea in both cases was that sound knowledge depends on the earliest and most fundamental sources.

== History ==
The phrase ad fontes occurs in Psalm 42 of the Latin Vulgate: (Note: Note that Psalms in the Latin Vulgate are arranged differently to most modern English Bibles. Psalm 42 is numbered in the Vulgate as 41.)

Quemadmodum desiderat cervus (or Sicut cervus desiderat) ad fontes aquarum ita desiderat anima mea ad te Deus.

[As a hart longs for the flowing streams, so longs my soul for thee, O God.]

The phrase in the humanist sense is associated with the poet Petrarch, whose poems Rerum Vulgarium Fragmenta (c. 1350) use the deer imagery of the Psalm.

Erasmus of Rotterdam used the phrase in his De ratione studii ac legendi interpretandique auctores:

Sed in primis ad fontes ipsos properandum, id est graecos et antiquos.

[Above all, one must hasten to the sources themselves, that is, to the Greeks and ancients.]

For Erasmus, ad fontes meant that to understand Christ in the Gospels in an educated way involved reading good translations of the New Testament, and the Greek and Roman philosophers and Church Fathers in the five hundred years surrounding Christ, over the earlier Old Testament and later Scholastics.

The Protestant Reformation called for renewed attention to the Bible as the primary source of Christian faith, to the extent of denying extra-biblical apostolic teaching authority: sola scriptura. This need to select a core that could reject unattractive Catholic doctrines led to the Protestant rejection of the deuterocanonical scriptures and queries, e.g. by Luther, on the canonicity or value of the Epistle of James.

Sylvia Wynter is quoted as suggesting that ad fontes heralded a power grab in which the formerly taken-for-granted authority of theology was replaced by "the authority of the lay activity of textual and philological scrutiny."

== Counter views ==
Ad fontes may be contrasted with various views of the development of doctrine:

- The softest being of Aquinas, whose views according to G. K. Chesterton were that doctrine developed the way a puppy develops into a dog: not changing and compromising into a cat but "becoming more doggy not less."
- The view of John Henry Newman "It is indeed sometimes said that the stream is clearest near the spring. Whatever use may fairly be made of this image, it does not apply to the history of a philosophy or belief, which on the contrary is more equable, and purer, and stronger, when its bed has become deep, and broad, and full."
- The most strident, representing perhaps a less extreme version of the Joachimite heresy, was the "Manual tradition": the Scholastic tendency to use Sentences (Excerpts), Catena (commentaries), Summa (exhaustive theologies) and the subset of Scriptures used in the daily office and Mass rather than primary material in context: the other material, not being in the standard available manuscripts, was in effect jettisoned and little-known to theologians or to the public. Representative of a linear view of history, the medieval selections (which favoured Augustine over other Church Fathers) and interpretations were deemed so excellent that they superseded the primitive primary material, rendering the philology concerns of the humanists extraneous. Louvain theologian Jacques Masson, who conducted the attempts to convert William Tyndale in prison, wrote that "the genuine sense of scripture is found in its purest form in the expositions and commentaries" of the scholastic doctors.
- The view of a number of bishops at the Council of Trent that the Vulgate was better than even the Greek originals because "it" had 1500 years of improvements, as guided by the Holy Spirit.

It may be noted that promoters of ad fontes did not necessarily deny the validity of the developments of dogma: notably Erasmus, who saw clarifications of doctrine (by Church Councils and the Pope) as a necessary part of their peace-keeping and uniting role (Note: He suggested that the Disciples' understanding of the Trinity was relatively undeveloped: "We dare name the Holy Spirit true God, proceeding from the Father and the Son, something the ancients did not dare.") that did not negate the wisdom of ad fontes.

== See also ==
- Ab initio
- List of Latin phrases
- Nouvelle théologie, a 20th-century theological movement that emphasized returning to the sources using the French term ressourcement
