= Jean Daniélou =

French Jesuit theologian and cardinal (1905–1974)

His Eminence Jean Daniélou S.J.
- Cardinal-Deacon of San Saba
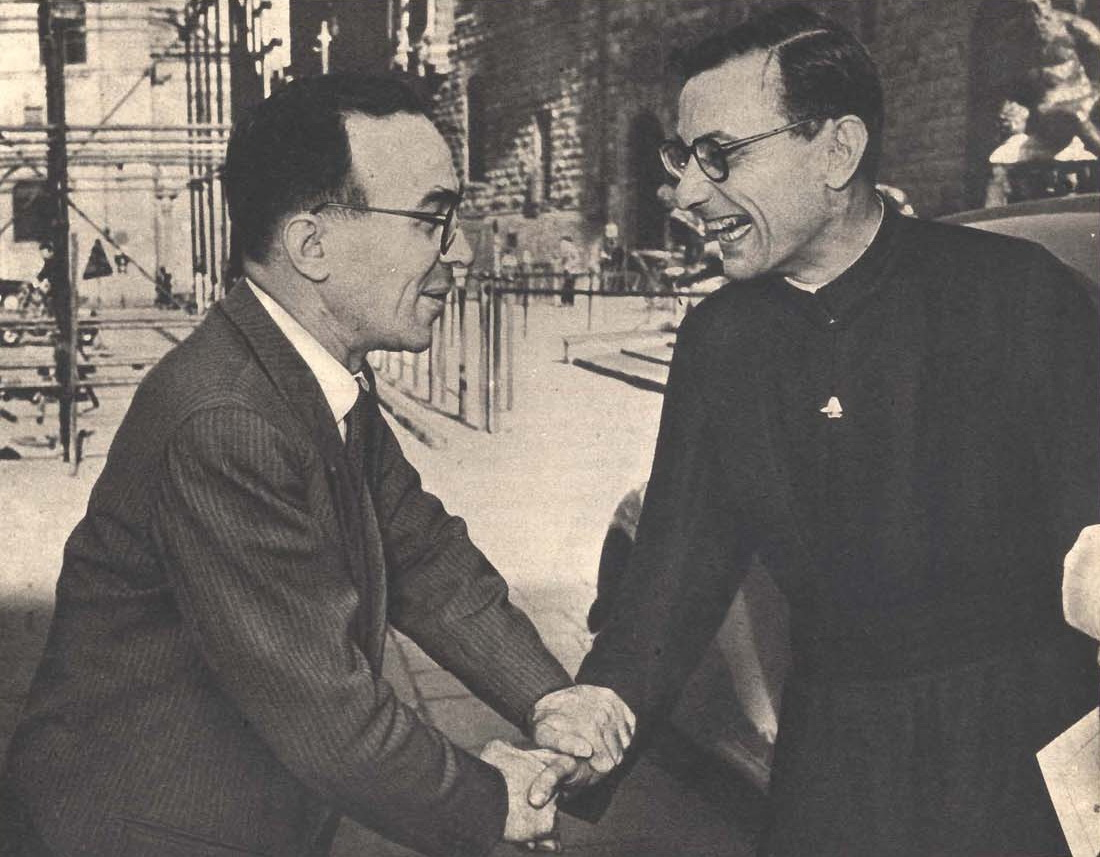
- Daniélou (right) in Florence with the mayor, Giorgio La Pira (left) in 1953.
- Church: Catholic Church
- Appointed: 30 April 1969
- Predecessor: Augustin Bea
- Successor: Joseph Schröffer
- Previous post: Titular Archbishop of Taormina (1969)

Orders
- Ordination: 20 August 1938
- Consecration: 19 April 1969 by François Marty
- Created cardinal: 28 April 1969 by Pope Paul VI

Personal details
- Born: Jean-Guenolé-Marie Daniélou; 14 May 1905 Neuilly-sur-Seine, France
- Died: 20 May 1974 (aged 69) Paris, France
- Motto: Fluvium aquæ vitæ ("The stream of the water of life")
- Coat of arms

Jean-Guenolé-Marie Daniélou S.J. (French: [danjelu]; 14 May 1905 – 20 May 1974) was a French Jesuit and cardinal, an internationally well known patrologist, theologian and historian and a member of the Académie française.

== Biography ==
=== Early life and studies ===
Jean-Guenolé-Marie Daniélou was born on 14 May 1905 in Neuilly-sur-Seine. He was the son of Charles Daniélou and Madeleine Clamorgan. His father was an anticlerical politician who several times as a minister served in the French government, while his mother was a Catholic educator and the founder of institutions for women's education. His brother Alain (1907–1994) was a noted Indologist and historian. Alain's homosexuality was a concern of Jean's, who often said mass in this intention regularly.

Daniélou studied at the Sorbonne and passed his agrégation in grammar in 1927. He joined the Society of Jesus in 1929 and during his regency taught at a boys' school in Poitiers, from 1934 to 1936. He then studied theology at Fourvière in Lyon under Henri de Lubac, who introduced him to the specialized study of the Fathers of the Church. He was ordained a priest on 19 August 1938.

=== Priesthood, episcopate and cardinalate ===
During World War II, Daniélou served with the Air Force in 1939–1940. With the fall of France to Nazi Germany he was returned to civilian life and began doctoral studies, completing in 1942 his thesis on the spiritual doctrine of Gregory of Nyssa. He was then appointed chaplain to the female section of the École Normale Supérieure, at Sèvres. He spent most of his time on research in patristics, and he became, together with Henri de Lubac, one of the founders of the Sources Chrétiennes book series. In 1944 he was named Professor of Early Christian History at the Institut Catholique de Paris, later becoming dean there. Beginning in the 1950s he produced several historical studies which included The Bible and the Liturgy, The Lord of History, and From Shadows to Reality that furnished background for the development of Covenantal Theology.

Thoroughly grounded in the Fathers of the Church, who worked from Scripture, Daniélou generally avoided the neo-Thomistic approach and used a more relational vocabulary, emphasizing our self-gift in response to God's gift in Jesus Christ, with the gradual unveiling of the Trinitarian life in history.

Together with Henri Bouillard, he founded the Institut de science et théologie des religions (ISTR) in 1967.

Pope John XXIII appointed Daniélou a peritus of the Second Vatican Council. In 1969 Pope Paul VI made him a cardinal. As a result, he was ordained to the episcopal titular see of Taormina, and assigned the title of Cardinal-Deacon of San Saba, a Jesuit-run parish in Rome. Rather like his theology professor Henri de Lubac, Daniélou twice refused the cardinalate but eventually accepted at the insistence of Paul VI. He was elected to the Académie Française on 9 November 1972 to succeed Cardinal Eugène Tisserant.

=== Death and legacy ===
He died unexpectedly in 1974 in the home of a woman who was alleged to be a prostitute. The Society of Jesus, after an investigation, stated that Daniélou was bringing a gift of money to pay for the bail of the woman's husband. Like a number of other prominent public figures, Daniélou's brother Alain defended him, pointing out that he had always gone out of his way to serve those in most need.

== Bibliography ==
A number of Daniélou's works on the early Church, often abridged for a popular audience, remain in print.

French works, with English translations

- Platonisme et théologie mystique: Doctrine spirituelle de saint Grégoire de Nysse, (Paris: Aubier, 1944)
- 'Les orientations preésentes de la pensée religieuse', Études 249, (1946), 5–21
- Origène, Table ronde, Paris, 1948 [Origen, trans. Walter Mitchell, (New York: Sheed & Ward, 1955)]
- Sacramentum futuri: Études sur les origines de la typologie biblique, (Paris: Beauchesne, 1950)
- Bible et liturgie, la théologie biblique des sacrements et des fêtes d'après les Pères de l'Église, Cerf, Paris, 1951 [The Bible and the Liturgy, Liturgical Studies, 3 (Notre Dame, IN: University of Notre Dame Press, 1956)]
- Les anges et leur mission, d'après les Pères de l'Église, Desclée, Paris, 1952 [The Angels and their Mission: According to the Fathers of the Church, trans David Heimann, (1957)]
- Essai sur le mystère de l'histoire, (Paris: Éditions du Seuil, 1953)
- Dieu et nous, Bernard Grasset, Paris, 1956. [God and the Ways of Knowing, trans. Walter Roberts, (1956; repr San Francisco, CA: Ignatius Press, 2023)]
- Les manuscrits de la Mer Morte et les origines du Christianisme, L'Orante, Paris, 1957 [The Dead Sea Scrolls and Primitive Christianity, (Greenwood Publishing Group, 1979)]
- Histoire des doctrines chrétiennes avant Nicée, 3 vols, (Paris: Desclée, Éditions du Cerf, 1958–1978)
  - Théologie du Judéo-Christianisme, Histoire des doctrines chrétiennes avant Nicée vol 1, (Tournai: Desclée, 1958) [The Theology of Jewish Christianity, trans. and ed. by John Austin Baker, (London: Darton, Longman and Todd, 1964)
  - Message évangélique et culture hellénistique aux IIe et IIIe siècles, Histoire des doctrines chrétiennes avant Nicée vol 2, (Tournai: Desclée, 1961) [Gospel Message and Hellenistic Culture, trans. and ed. John Austin Baker, (London: Darton, Longman and Todd, 1973)]
  - Les origines du christianisme latin, Histoire des doctrines chrétiennes avant Nicée vol 3, (Paris: Cerf, 1978) [The Origins of Latin Christianity, (Philadelphia: Westminster Press, 1977)]
- Philon d'Alexandrie, Fayard, Paris, 1958
- Approches du Christ, (Paris: B. Grasset, 1960) [Christ and Us, trans. Walter Robert, (New York: Sheed & Ward, 1961)]
- Les Symboles chrétiens primitifs, Seuil, Paris, 1961
- L'Église des premiers temps : Des origines à la fin du IIIe siècle, Paris: Éditions du Seuil, 1963)
- (with Henri Marrou), Des origines a saint Grégoire le Grand, (Paris: Éditions du Seuil, 1963)
- Les Évangiles de l'enfance, (Paris: Seuil, 1967) [The infancy narratives, trans Rosemary Sheed, (London: Burns & Oates, 1968)]
- La Trinité et le mystère de l'existence, (Desclée de Brouwer, Paris, 1968)
- 'Saint Hilaire et son temps', in Hilaire de Poitiers: Évêque et docteur; cinq conférences données à Poitiersà l'occasion du XVIe centenaire de sa mort (368-1968), (Paris: Études Augustiniennes, 1968)
- La Foi de toujours et l'homme d'aujourd'hui, (Paris: Beauchesne, 1969)
- La Résurrection, (Paris: Éditions du Seuil, 1969)
- L'être et le temps chez Grégoire de Nysse, (Leiden: Brill, 1970)

Other works

- Libretto for Stravinsky's Oedipus Rex: A Latin translation of Jean Cocteau's arrangement of Sophocles' original Oedipus Rex.

Other English translations

- The Salvation of the Nations, trans. Angeline Bouchard, (New York: Sheed and Ward, 1950)
- Advent, trans. Rosemary Sheed, (1950)
- Holy Pagans of the Old Testament, trans. Felix Faber, (London: Longmans, Green and Co, 1957)
- The Lord of History: Reflections on the Inner Meaning of History, trans. Nigel Abercrombie, (1958; repr Cleveland, OH: Meridian, 1968)
- The Presence of God, trans. Walter Roberts, (Baltimore, MD: Helicon, 1959)
- From Shadows to Reality: Studies in the Biblical Typology of the Fathers, trans. Wulstan Hibberd, (London: Burns & Oates, 1960)
- The Ministry of Women in the Early Church, (Leighton Buzzard: Faith Press, 1961)
- The Advent of Salvation: A Comparative Study of Non-Christian Religions and Christianity, trans. Rosemary Sheed, (New York: Paulist, 1962)
- The Scandal of Truth, trans. W. J. Kerrigan, (London: Burns & Oates, 1963)
- Primitive Christian Symbols, trans. Donald Attwater, (London: Burns & Oates, 1964)
- Prayer as a Political Problem, trans. and ed. J. R. Kirwan, (New York: Sheed and Ward, 1967)
- Dialogue with Israel, (Baltimore: Helicon, 1968)
- Myth and Mystery, (New York: Hawthorn Books, 1968)
- God's Life in Us, (Dimension Books, 1969)
- Historical Theology, Viking Press, 1970
- Why the Church? Franciscan Press, 1975
- Prayer: The Mission of the Church, (Grand Rapids, MI: WB Eerdmans, 1996)
