= Transignification =

Explanation of transubstantiation

Transignification is an idea originating from the attempts of Roman Catholic theologians, especially Edward Schillebeeckx, to better understand the mystery of the real presence of Christ in the Eucharist in light of a new philosophy of the nature of reality that is more in line with contemporary physics.

== Description ==
Transignification suggests that although Christ's body and blood are not physically present in the Eucharist, they are really and objectively so, as the elements take on, at the consecration, the real significance of Christ's body and blood which thus become sacramentally present. As Joseph Martos articulates, "The basic philosophical idea behind it was that significance or meaning is a constitutive element of reality as it is known to human beings, and this is especially true of human realities like attitudes and relationships. Such human realities ... are known through the meaning those actions have for people." Thus, "the reality of the bread and wine is changed during the mass not in any physical way but in a way which is nonetheless real, for as soon as they signify the body and blood of Christ they become sacramental, embodying and revealing Christ's presence in a way which is experienceably real. In other words, when the meaning of the elements changes, their reality changes for those who have faith in Christ and accept the new meaning that he gave them, whereas for those without faith and who are unaware of their divinely given meaning, they appear to remain bread and wine."

== Relation to other Eucharist theories ==
It is thus contrasted not only to belief in a physical or chemical change in the elements, but also to the doctrine of the Roman Catholic Church that there is a change only of the underlying reality, but not of anything that concerns physics or chemistry (see transubstantiation).

The theory has been rejected by the Magisterium of the Roman Catholic Church, in particular in Pope Paul VI's 1965 encyclical Mysterium fidei:

[...]it is not permissible to[...] discuss the mystery of transubstantiation without mentioning what the Council of Trent had to say about the marvelous conversion of the whole substance [...] as if they involve nothing more than "transignification," or "transfinalization" as they call it...

Pope Paul VI's encyclical mentioned the term 'transignification' in only that sentence and did not cite Schillebeeckx's name.

However, it is considered to be similar to the Anglican position set forth by Thomas Cranmer in the Thirty-Nine Articles (Number 28).

However, Edward Schillebeeckx interprets transignification as properly elaborating, not replacing, to the doctrine of transubstantiation. For Schillebeeckx, the question of the transubstantiation requires a grounding in human perception: perception, he says, exists in a differentiated unity, consisting of both an openness to receiving the gift of true reality (the mystery that is God's milieu) through phenomena, and a human giving of meaning to that reality. Consequently, he says, the phenomenal is "not only the sensory, but also everything that is expressed of the reality itself or concretely appears to us, which is, then, inadequate to what is expressed (the reality as a mystery)." In other words, an objective and ineffable reality exists beyond humans and is offered to human, but because all human existence is situated in the limitedness of human senses, it is constituted in human perception—which itself is entwined with the meaning-making processes through which humans navigate the world. Consequently, he concludes that Eucharist is objectively the real presence of Christ, appearing to man as sacramental nourishment, but the "re-creative activity of the Holy Spirit" causes the phenomenal forms of bread and wine to signify a different reality—which, as a consequence, prompts a new human experience of meaning-making in the Eucharist. While Christ is objectively present in the Eucharist, the human experience of the Eucharist occurs because of both a change in the way the phenomenal points to noumena reality and a miraculous alteration in meaning. This theological understanding of Eucharist reflects modern understanding and moves beyond the strictures of Thomism which, in the view of transignification’s proponents, does not work well with modern understanding of the world.

== See also ==
- Anglican eucharistic theology
- Consubstantiation
- Eucharistic theologies summarised
- Lord's Supper in Reformed theology
- Impanation
- Real presence
- Receptionism
