= Eucharist in the Catholic Church =

Catholic sacrament

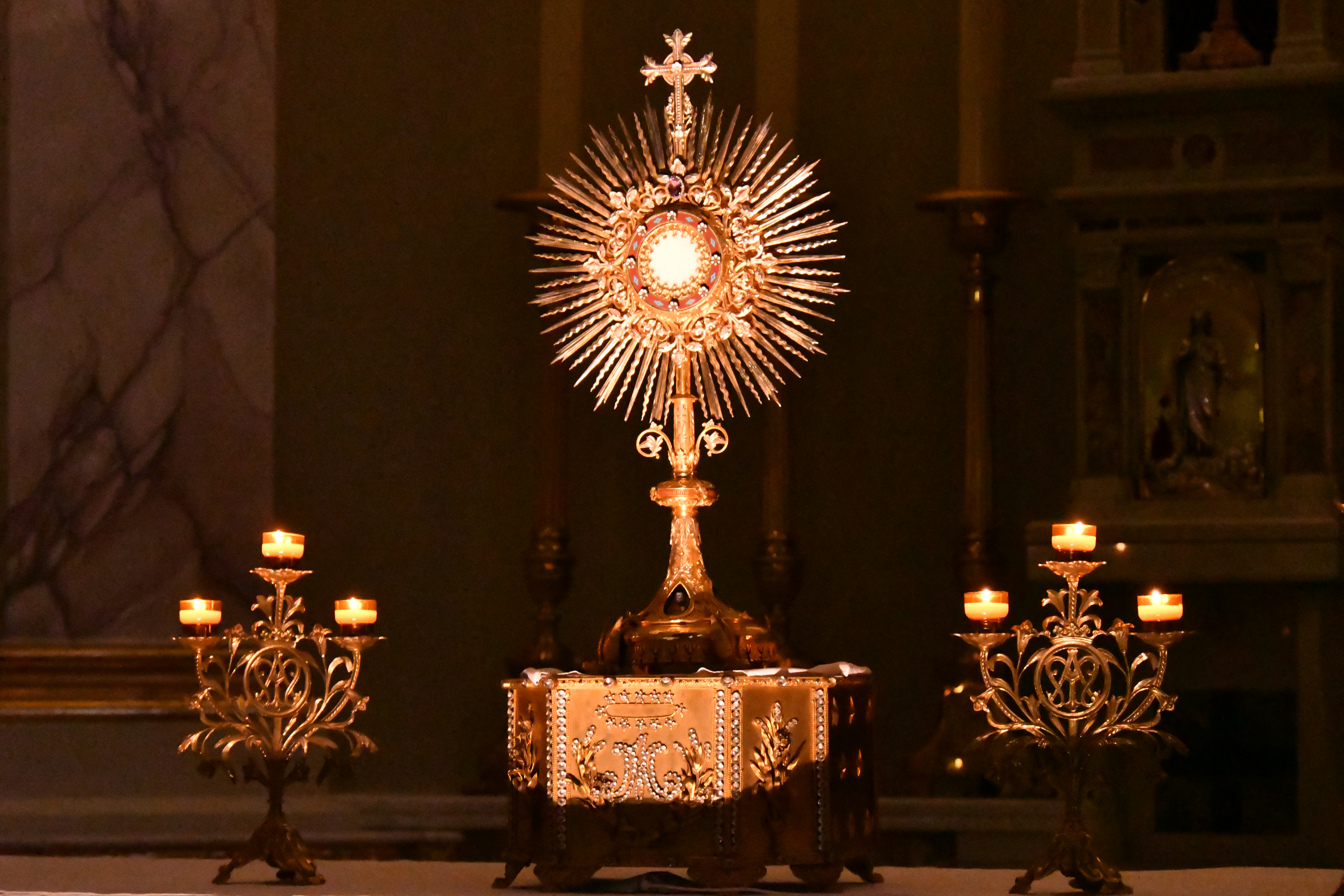
Eucharist displayed for adoration

The Eucharist (Koine Greek: εὐχαριστία, romanized: eucharistía, lit. 'thanksgiving') is the term used in the Catholic Church for the sacrament in which, according to Catholic doctrine, the body and blood of Christ are made present under the appearances of consecrated bread and wine during the Eucharistic liturgy commonly called the Mass.

The 1983 Code of Canon Law describes the Eucharist as "the most August sacrament in which Christ the Lord himself is contained, offered, and received and by which the Church continually lives and grows", and further teaches that the Eucharistic sacrifice is "the summit and source of all worship and Christian life", with all other sacraments and works of the apostolate ordered to it. Catholic theology commonly distinguishes three closely related dimensions of the sacrament: Christ’s real presence in the Eucharist, the reception of Holy Communion, and the sacrificial character of the Mass.

The term "Eucharist" derives from the Greek word eucharistia, meaning "thanksgiving", and is associated with the New Testament accounts of the Last Supper in Matthew 26:26–28, Mark 14:22–24, Luke 22:19–20, and 1 Corinthians 11:23–29—where Jesus "gave thanks" over the bread and the cup. In Catholic usage, three commonly used terms relate to the Eucharist: "Mass" refers to the liturgical celebration in which the Eucharist is consecrated; "Holy Communion" designates the reception of the consecrated species; and "Blessed Sacrament" refers to the Eucharistic species outside the celebration of Mass, especially in devotional practices such as adoration.

In Catholicism, consecrated hosts are reserved in a tabernacle so that Holy Communion may be brought to the sick and the dying and to support the practice of Eucharistic adoration.

== Theology ==
=== Theological references ===
==== Old Testament ====
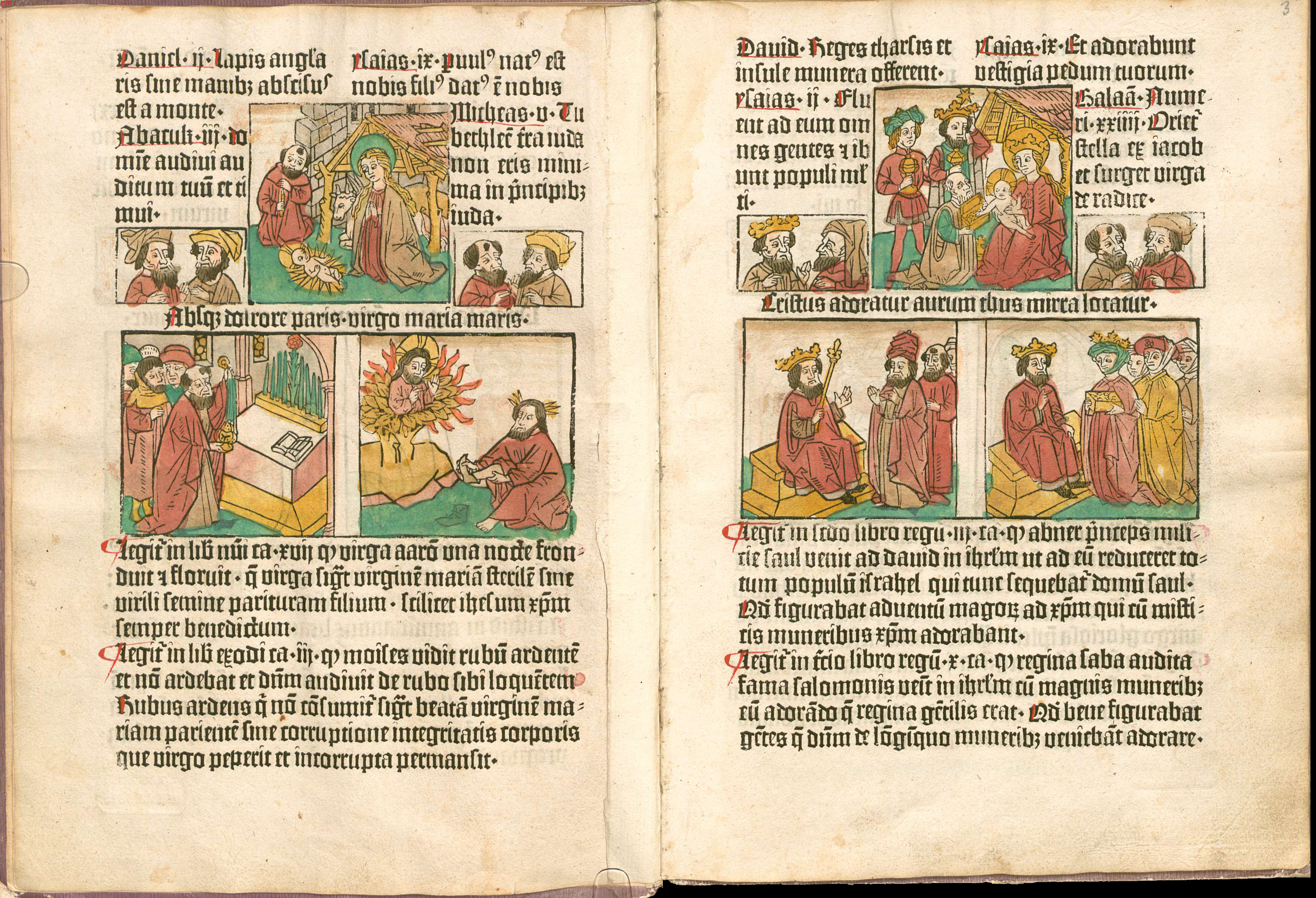
The reverence Moses showed before the burning bush on Mt. Sinai is equated with the adoration of the Shepherds and the priest celebrating the sacrifice of the Mass.

Old Testament passages have long been interpreted in Christian and especially Catholic tradition, as well as by many theologians and biblical scholars, as prefigurations of the Eucharist. Among the most frequently cited examples in this tradition are Melchizedek's offering of bread and wine, the covenant sacrifice on Mount Sinai, the manna given to the Israelites during their journey to the Promised Land, and the bread from heaven that strengthened Elijah. In this typological reading, some theologians describe the Sinai covenant as establishing "God’s sanctuary presence among them" and as anticipating "the presence of the incarnate Passover Lamb and humanity’s final deliverance from slavery to sin." Some Catholic theologians characterize the manna as "wholly supernatural", "manifesting God’s extraordinary power over creation," and regard it as "essential if one is to contemplate the Eucharist," since it represents God's provision of holy food to Israel. Within this Christian interpretive tradition, Christ is understood as the new paschal lamb, and the Eucharist as the new bread of the Passover.

Thomas Aquinas developed this typological reading by identifying several Old Testament figures as anticipations of the Eucharist. According to Thomistic interpreters, Aquinas taught that Melchizedek's offering prefigured the Eucharist's sign aspect, that the Day of Atonement sacrifice prefigured its content as Christ's self-offering, and that the manna prefigured its effect as grace. He further held that the paschal lamb exemplified all three dimensions—sign, content, and effect—within a single figure. Therefore, Melchizedek's act of bringing out the bread and wine has been interpreted as Eucharistic foreshadowing, a view also reflected in Catholic teaching. Jesus' statement, "This is my blood of the New Testament, which is shed for many for the remission of sins," has been interpreted by theologians as fulfilling Old Testament sacrificial themes.

In the New Testament, Jesus’ final meal with his disciples is presented in the synoptic Gospels as a Jewish Passover meal, and this setting is central to Catholic Eucharistic interpretation. Some theologians compare the Passover, as a thanksgiving celebration, to the todah or thanksgiving sacrifice, while noting that in the Eucharistic context it is Jesus' body "which is given for you." Tim Gray argues that Jesus' citation of Psalm 22 on the cross (Mark 15:34) exemplifies "a characteristic todah movement from lament to praise". The Passover ritual required a sacrificial lamb and unleavened bread, elements that inform Christian interpretations of the Last Supper. Jesus’ words over the cup—"this is my blood of the covenant"—echo the Mosaic covenant in which blood seals and inaugurates a sacred bond. His description of his blood as "poured out for many for the forgiveness of sins" evokes prophetic themes concerning the "many" among Israel’s exiled tribes and the figure of the suffering servant, whose "life is poured out for the sin of many." Some theologians point to certain Old Testament "oblations to the Lord", such as bread offerings anointed with oil, and interpret them as further prefigurations of the Eucharist. In John 6:58, Jesus said to the Jews, "This is the bread that came down from heaven. Your ancestors ate manna and died, but whoever feeds on this bread will live forever."

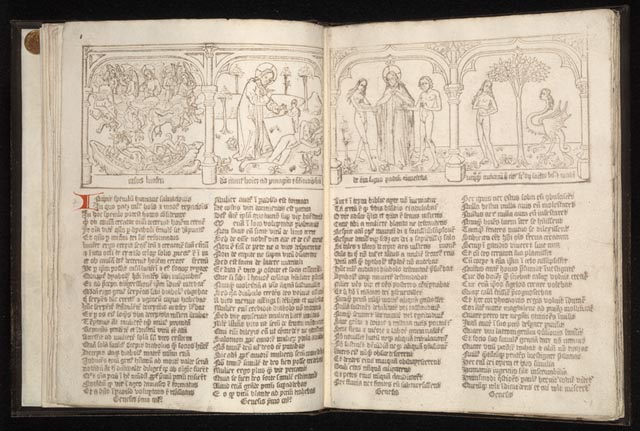
The Speculum Humanae Salvationis contains illustrations of related scenes from the Old and New Testaments.

==== New Testament ====
New Testament passages used in Eucharistic interpretation include the Lord's Prayer, the Gospel of John, and Paul's First Epistle to the Corinthians. The Catechism of the Catholic Church interprets the word epiousios—a rare term not found in Classical Greek literature and used in the Lord's Prayer—as "super-essential" or "super-substantial" bread and understands it as also referring to the Eucharist. In the Gospel of John, Jesus' statement "for my flesh is real food and my blood is real drink" has been interpreted by some commentators as indicating that he intended his words to be taken in a strongly literal or realist sense; the Gospel further reports that many disciples ceased following him after this discourse. The Catholic Church uses the Words of Institution—found in the three synoptic Gospels and in Paul’s First Epistle to the Corinthians—as a biblical basis for belief in the real presence and for linking the Eucharist to Old Testament covenant and sacrificial themes. In 1 Corinthians, Paul teaches that participation in the cup and the bread is a participation in the blood and body of Christ, that "we all share the one loaf," and he warns that "whoever eats the bread or drinks the cup of the Lord in an unworthy manner will be guilty of sinning against the body and blood of the Lord". Ryan Habbena argues that Jesus emphasizes faith for understanding his presence in the bread, noting that the verb pisteuō ("believe") appears 98 times in the Gospel of John.

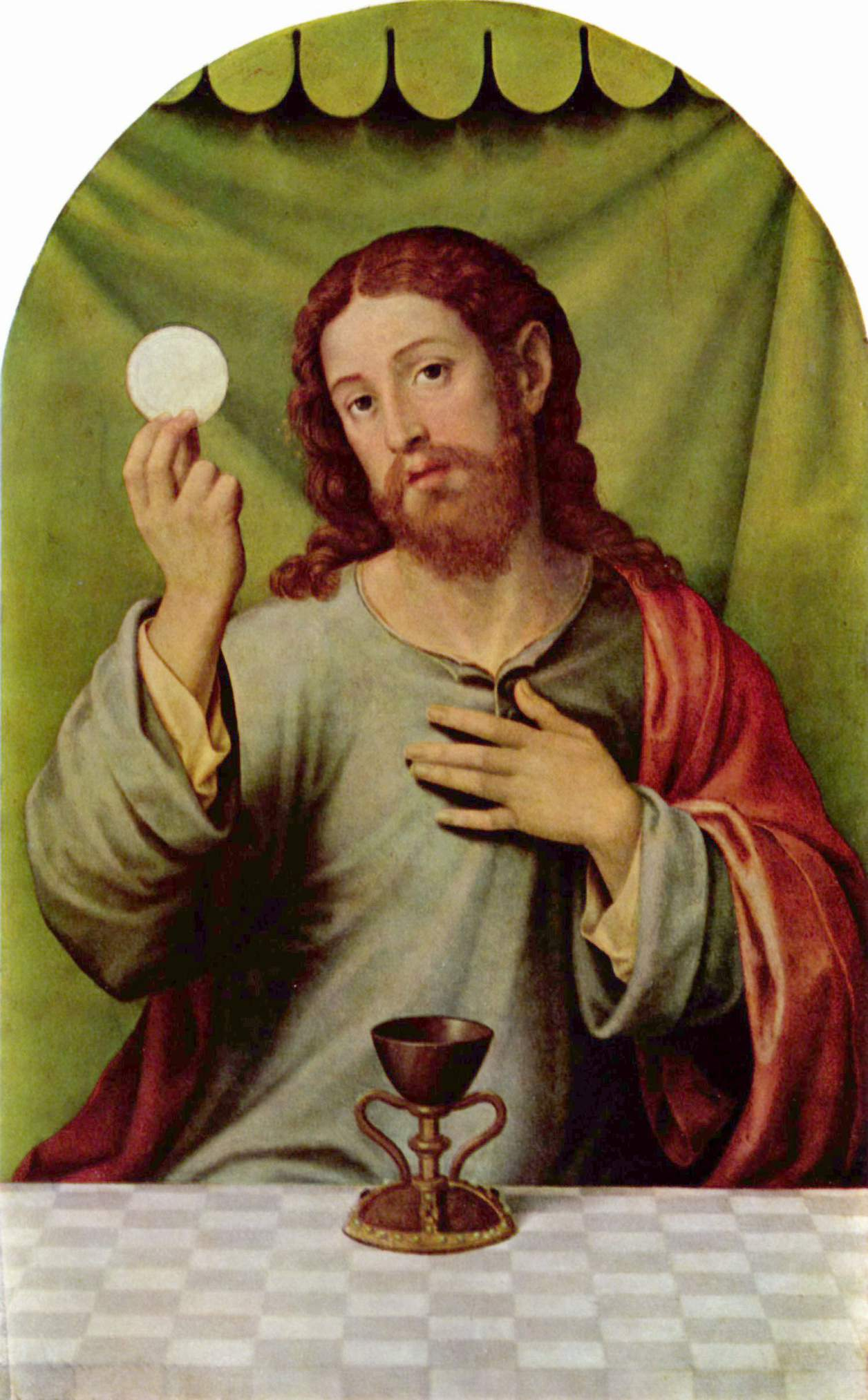
Jesus Christ with the Holy Eucharist

Other New Testament passages that have been interpreted in a Eucharistic sense include the disciples recognizing Christ "in the breaking of the bread" in the Gospel of Luke after the Resurrection, the apostles "breaking bread" in their homes while gathering in the temple in the Acts of the Apostles, and Paul’s teaching in 1 Corinthians that eating the bread and drinking the cup "proclaims the Lord’s death until he comes."

== Leaders and documents ==
=== Early leaders and documents ===
Early Christian documents and leaders, such as the Didache and figures including Ignatius of Antioch (d. c. 110), Justin Martyr (c. 150), Irenaeus of Lyons (c. 180), Clement of Alexandria (c. 202), and Cyprian of Carthage (c. 250), contributed to early Christian understandings of the Eucharist. The concept of apostolic tradition and decisions of Church councils, including the First Council of Nicaea and later the Council of Trent, contributed to shaping doctrine and regulating discipline concerning the reception and administration of the Eucharist.

Whether the agape feast, a meal held by Christians during the first centuries, was identical with, or distinct from, the Eucharist celebration is uncertain. Abuses associated with communal meals are criticized in the New Testament, notably by Paul and Jude. Some scholars argue that such concerns contributed to the gradual separation of the Eucharistic celebration from the agape meal. Justin Martyr, writing in the mid-second century, describes a Sunday gathering that includes readings, a homily, prayers, the offering of bread and wine mixed with water, and their distribution to those present, a pattern that has been compared to later Eucharistic liturgies. Justin wrote that the Christians did not receive the bread and wine as common bread and drink, having been taught that it "is the flesh and blood of that Jesus who was made flesh".

The Didache, an early Christian manual, includes prayers over bread and wine and instructs that only the baptized may partake of the Eucharist. Ignatius of Antioch has been interpreted as expressing a strong Eucharistic realism, writing that he desired "the Bread of God, which is the Flesh of Jesus Christ... and for drink I desire His Blood, which is love incorruptible", and urging Christians to avoid those who denied that the Eucharist is the flesh of Jesus Christ. Justin Martyr professed that the Eucharist "is both the flesh and the blood of that incarnated Jesus". Irenaeus of Lyons echoed Justin's views, wondering how others could "affirm that the flesh is incapable of receiving the gift of God". Clement of Alexandria said that the Lord supplies "these intimate nutriments" by delivering "over His Flesh" and pouring "out His Blood". Ambrose of Milan observed that "bread is bread before the words of the Sacraments; where the consecration has entered in, the bread becomes the Flesh of Christ". Cyprian of Carthage identified it with the Lord's Prayer, adding that Christians should "daily receive the Eucharist for the food of salvation", unless wounded by a heinous sin.

Early Church documents and councils emphasized reverence in the celebration of the Eucharist. Eucharistic reverence is emphasized in the early liturgical work known as the Apostolic Tradition, which instructs that "nor a mouse or other animal" may eat of the Eucharist, that clergy must ensure none of "it falls and is lost", and that the faithful should "partake of the Eucharist before eating anything else". The First Council of Nicaea, in its eighteenth canon, addressed abuses involving deacons and the Eucharist, forbidding deacons to give Communion to presbyters or to receive it before them, and stating, "[L]et all such practices be utterly done away, and let the deacons remain within their own bounds, knowing that they are the ministers of the bishop and the inferiors of the presbyters".

=== Later leaders and documents ===
Beyond earlier Church leaders and documents, reflection on the Eucharist contributed in later centuries in the writings of Origen (d. c. 253), Ephrem the Syrian (d. 373), Augustine of Hippo (354-430), Paschasius Radbertus (c. 785-c. 865), Berengarius of Tours (c. 999-1088), who is known for challenging traditional teaching on Eucharistic conversion, Thomas Aquinas (1225-1274), and various popes, who further articulated and clarified Eucharistic doctrine. Origen said participants must "reverently exercise every care lest a particle of it fall", Ephrem said they must "eat this Bread, and do not scatter the crumbs", and Augustine mentioned that Jesus "gave us the same flesh to be eaten unto salvation. But no one eats that flesh unless first he adores it". Paschasius Radbertus, following Ambrose, argued that the Eucharist contains the true, historical body of Jesus Christ and that, since God is truth itself, Christ's words over the bread and wine are to be understood in a straightforward, non-figurative sense. However, theologians, such as Berengarius, interpreted Eucharistic language less literally, a divergence that contributed to theological controversy.

Allegory of the Holy Eucharist

In the eleventh century, Berengarius of Tours, archdeacon of Angers, questioned traditional teaching on Eucharistic conversion, provoking significant controversy in the Western Church. According to one scholarly interpretation, Berengarius was concerned that consecration should not "entail the corollary that the species wholly cease to be bread and wine", which he saw as incompatible with the "Augustinian concept of the sacrament as sign". He noted that even if a supernatural change occurred in the bread and wine, there is "no ground for thinking that the senses are deceived in supposing the bread to be bread and the wine wine even after the prayer of consecration". To argue otherwise, it would make God "open to the charge of being less than frank with his believers".

At a council in Rome in 1059, presided over by Pope Nicholas II, Berengarius gave an assent that one historian describes as "reluctant," under pressure from Cardinal Humbert of Silva Candida. The formula used at the council stated that the Eucharistic change "occurs in the realm of the five senses... therefore it is no mere symbol of Christ's body... but the actuality". Berengarius later withdrew his assent, and one scholar writes that he argued with "cogency that the formula was in any event internally self-contradictory". At the Lateran councils of 1078 and 1079, Berengarius signed a profession of faith stating that the bread and wine are "substantially converted into the very flesh and blood of our Lord Jesus Christ". Some scholars note that, despite this formula, he continued to hold that the bread and wine retain their natural properties and receive "a power of sanctification", becoming "the sacrament of His body and blood" rather than his actual flesh. The Council of Trent firmly rejected this belief, stating:

In the first place, the holy Synod teaches, and openly and simply professes, that, in the august sacrament of the holy Eucharist, after the consecration of the bread and wine, our Lord Jesus Christ, true God and man, is truly, really, and substantially contained under the species of those sensible things. For neither are these things mutually repugnant, -that our Saviour Himself always sitteth at the right hand of the Father in heaven, according to the natural mode of existing, and that, nevertheless, He be, in many other places, sacramentally present to us in his own substance, by a manner of existing.

A major scholastic treatment of the Eucharist is Thomas Aquinas's Summa Theologiae, which includes detailed philosophical discussions of the sacrament; Aquinas argues that the true presence "cannot be detected by sense, nor understanding, but by faith alone" and that "Christ is Himself contained in the Eucharist sacramentally", since the sacrament "should contain Christ Himself crucified, not merely in signification or figure, but also in very truth". Aquinas also cites Cyril of Jerusalem in support of the view that faith is essential for understanding the Eucharistic mystery. He noted that the "Eucharist is spirit and life in ways that include both the figure and the reality of the sacrament", declaring that "the form of the words, This is my body, does not indicate that bread and wine remain". According to some scholars, Aquinas' treatment of the Eucharist in The Summa Theologiae draws on and harmonizes elements from both Ambrose of Milan and Augustine of Hippo. Aquinas, following Aristotelian metaphysics, teaches that the final cause is the "cause of all causes" and gives it priority over "material and formal causes".

In his Summa Theologiae, Aquinas responded to an objection about how Baptism negates the need for the institution of the Eucharist, claiming:

On the contrary, This sacrament was instituted by Christ, of Whom it is said (Mark 7:37) that "He did all things well."

I answer that, This sacrament was appropriately instituted at the supper, when Christ conversed with His disciples for the last time. First of all, because of what is contained in the sacrament: for Christ is Himself contained in the Eucharist sacramentally. Consequently, when Christ was going to leave His disciples in His proper species, He left Himself with them under the sacramental species; as the Emperor's image is set up to be reverenced in his absence. Hence Eusebius says: "Since He was going to withdraw His assumed body from their eyes, and bear it away to the stars, it was needful that on the day of the supper He should consecrate the sacrament of His body and blood for our sakes, in order that what was once offered up for our ransom should be fittingly worshiped in a mystery."

Pope Paul VI, in his 1965 encyclical letter, rejected the attempt by some Catholic theologians to present the Eucharistic change as an alteration of significance, or transignification rather than transubstantiation. In his 1968 Credo of the People of God, he reiterated that any theological explanation must affirm that Christ's body and blood are truly present in the Eucharist and that the change is real and not merely in the mind of the believer. In his encyclical Ecclesia de Eucharistia, Pope John Paul II emphasized the centrality of the Eucharist in the ministry of bishops and priests, highlighting their particular responsibility to preside at its celebration.

== Doctrine ==
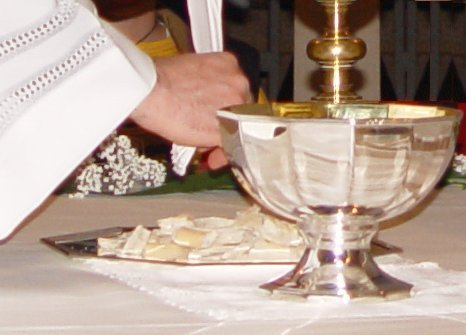
Breaking of the bread of the Eucharist at a Neocatechumenal Way celebration.

=== Sacrifice ===
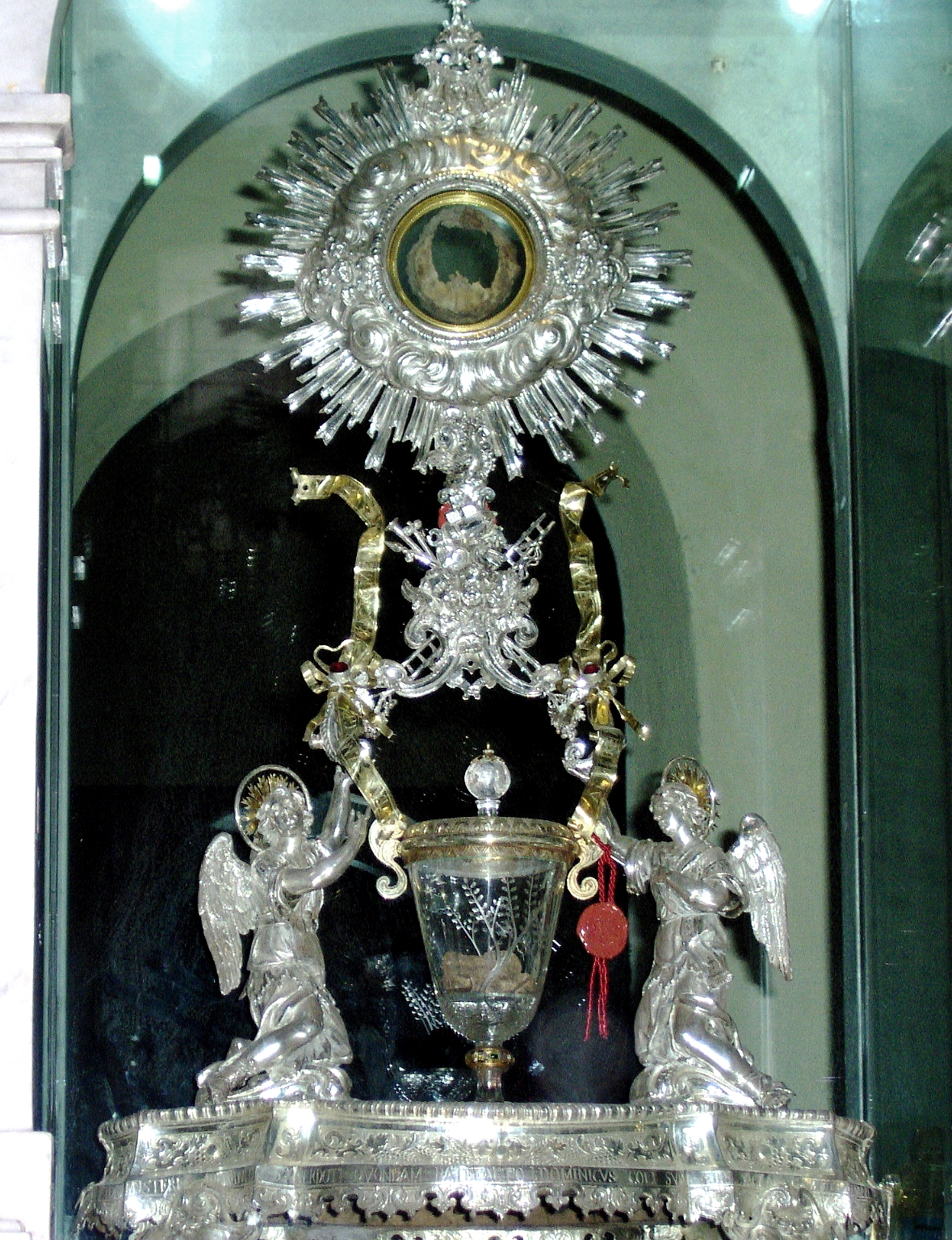
Photo of the consecrated host from the Eucharistic miracle of Lanciano, which occurred around 750 AD in the city of Lanciano, the Abruzzo region of Italy. A Basilian monk who doubted transubstantiation saw the bread and wine turn into flesh and blood during consecration; it is now venerated.

Many early Christian communities understood the Eucharist in sacrificial terms, though later Christian traditions debated the meaning and legitimacy of sacrificial language. Contemporary Catholic teaching holds that the celebration of the Eucharist makes present the sacrificial death of Jesus, in continuity with the Last Supper. While "sacrifice" in antiquity often referred to pagan rites or to the offering of animals in Judaism, theologian David Power argues that "the Cross of Christ replaced the rites of sacrifice with the table of Christ's body and blood," situating the Eucharist "outside the series of all earlier sacrificial rituals" and introducing "a totally different kind of reality" that fulfills the purpose of sacrifice "superabundantly". Vatican II's Sacrosanctum Concilium similarly teaches that "Christ entrusted this sacrifice to the Church, that the faithful might share in it both spiritually, by faith and charity, and sacramentally, through the banquet of Holy Communion". The Compendium of the Catechism of the Catholic Church also states that the "Eucharist is the very sacrifice of the Body and Blood of the Lord Jesus which he instituted to perpetuate the sacrifice of the cross". Catholic doctrine holds that it is the same sacrifice as Calvary because it represents the sacrifice of the cross as a memorial and because it applies its fruits.

The Protestant Reformation of the sixteenth century introduced major doctrinal divisions concerning the Eucharist and its sacrificial character. In the Catholic Church, the Council of Trent taught that "the same Christ who offered himself once in a bloody manner on the altar of the cross is contained and is offered in an unbloody manner" in the Mass, so that a true sacrifice occurs. According to theologian Stephen Sours, some Protestant communities abandoned "the doctrine of eucharistic sacrifice” or "the language of offering," while others truncated "its scope"; in his analysis, the idea of sacrifice in the Mass "became obscured in Protestant thought and life," rather than "simply being reformed of [its] excesses". Sours notes that early Methodist liturgies influenced by John and Charles Wesley retained certain sacrificial elements while rejecting transubstantiation, whereas later Methodist practice moved toward more symbolic interpretations.

Some early Protestant reformers criticized the Catholic doctrine of transubstantiation by asserting that it "requires you not to believe your senses", since it teaches that "what you eat and drink is not bread and wine, but the body and blood of Jesus Christ". Across Protestant traditions, views on the Eucharist diverged significantly. Martin Luther affirmed a "corporal, quasi-substantial presence" of Christ in the elements—often described as sacramental union rather than consubstantiation. In contrast, Huldrych Zwingli taught memoralism, interpreting the Eucharist as "a mere symbol of Christ". John Calvin articulated a real spiritual presence, wherein believers are spiritually nourished by Christ through the Holy Spirit, though his physical body remains in heaven. Because of these divisions, liturgical scholars have tried to "develop a doctrine of Christ's "dynamic presence" in the Eucharist, in a contrast to the "static presence” of a mere substance." The views held on the Eucharist can be divided into three categories: a "real physical presence" where "Christ’s body is actually present in the bread and wine", a "real spiritual presence" where the "Son is spiritually but not physically present in the meal", and the idea of "memorialism", where "the elements as primarily symbolic, taken in remembrance".

=== Transubstantiation and concomitance ===
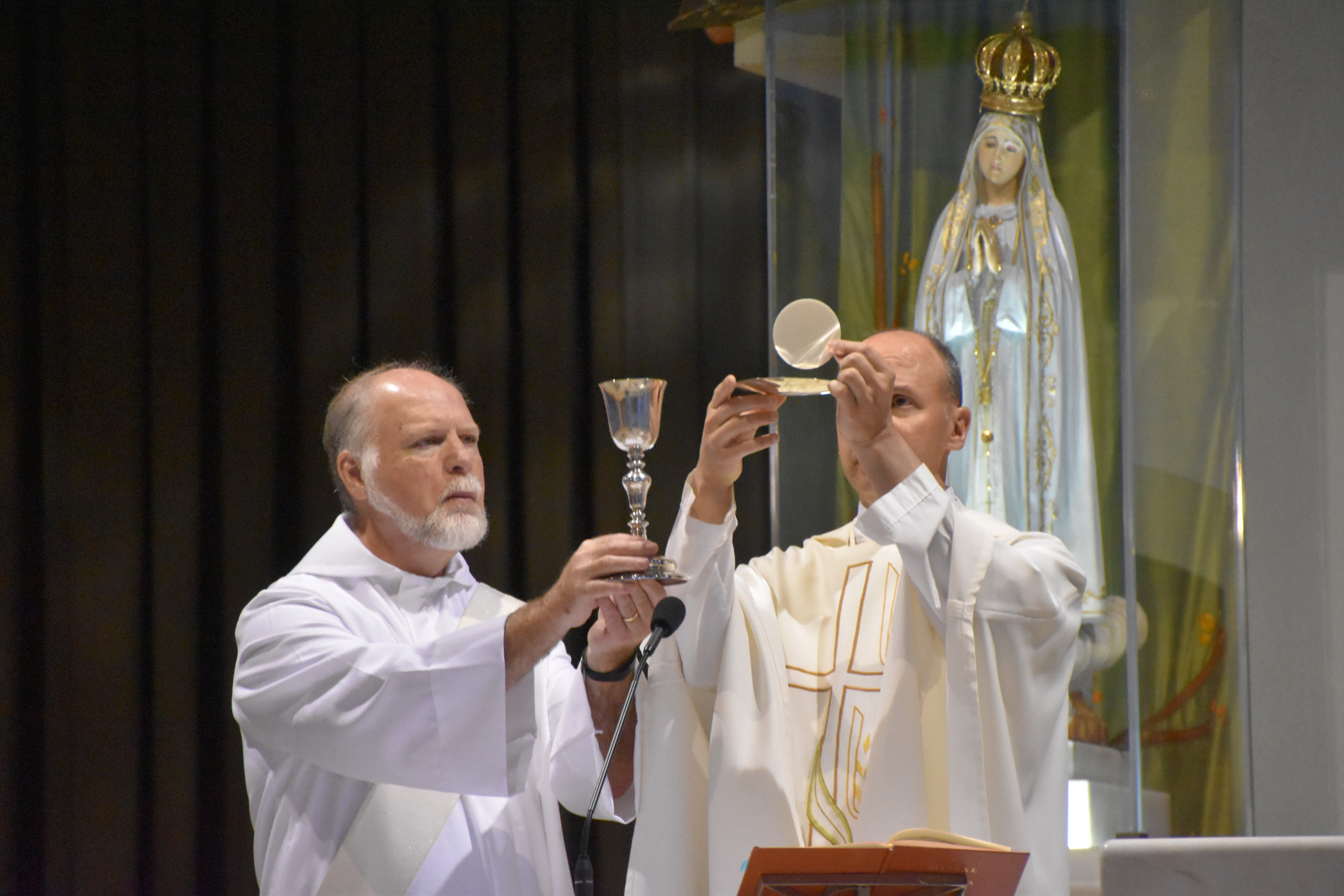
Eucharistic celebration at the Sanctuary of Our Lady of Fátima.

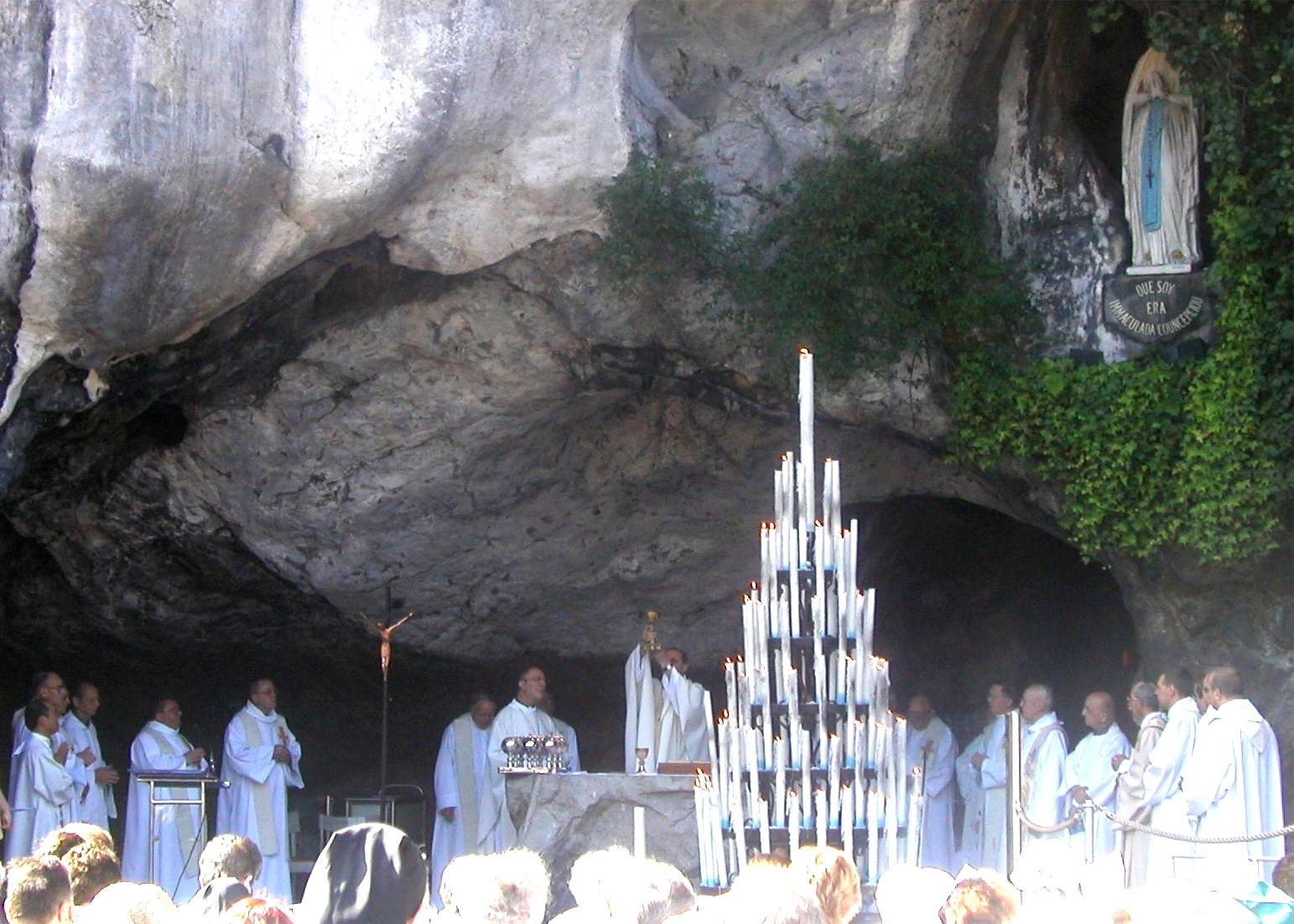
Mass at the Grotto of the Sanctuary of Our Lady of Lourdes. The chalice is displayed to the people immediately after the consecration of the wine.

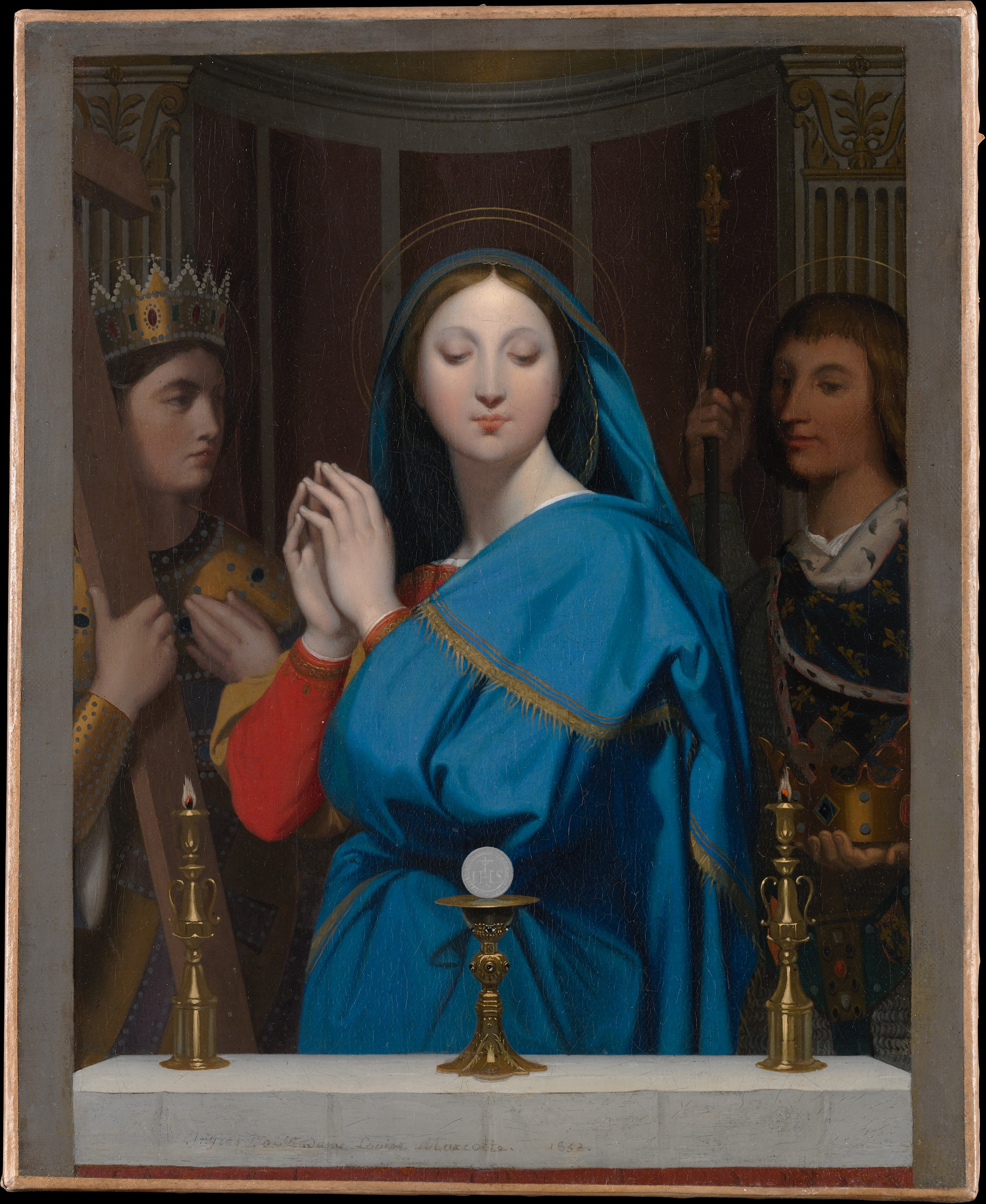
The Virgin Mary adoring the Host by Jean Auguste Dominique Ingres.

Transubstantiation (Latin: transubstantiatio) refers to the change of the substance of bread and wine into the body and blood of Christ, without change in the accidents of bread and wine, within the sacrament of the Eucharist. According to Catholic doctrine, by the power of the Holy Spirit and the words of Christ during consecration, they cease to be bread and wine. At his Last Supper, Jesus said, "This is my body"; Catholic teaching holds that, although the appearances of bread remained, the "substance" of the bread was changed to his body. In Catholic theology, because "substance" is understood as a metaphysical reality rather than a physical property accessible to the senses, the Church teaches that no change detectable by empirical science occurs, even though the substance is held to change. Expanding on transubstantiation, the doctrine of concomitance teaches that Christ's body and blood are inseparably present, so that communicants receiving either species receive "Christ, whole and entire—Body, Blood, Soul, and Divinity". The Catechism states that "Christ is present whole and entire in each of the species... the breaking of the bread does not divide Christ".

The Catholic Church teaches that, by transubstantiation, Christ is truly and substantially present under the appearances of bread and wine, a belief that underlies the practice of reserving consecrated elements in a tabernacle, bringing Holy Communion to the sick and dying, and fostering Eucharistic adoration. The Catechism states that the Eucharistic presence is "a presence in the fullest sense: that is to say, it is a substantial presence by which Christ, God and man, makes himself wholly and entirely present". In the New Testament, Saint Paul teaches that participation in the one loaf forms "worshippers into one body in Christ" and Jesus' words at the Last Supper describe the cup "for you" and "for the forgiveness of sins". John Zupez argues that "there was no separation of the fact of the real presence in the bread... the term transubstantiation focuses only on the fact".

Hildebert de Lavardin, Archbishop of Tours, is among the earliest Latin authors known to use the term "transubstantiation" to describe the change from bread and wine to the body and blood of Christ. Early Latin Christian writers also used the term "substance" (substantia), for example in speaking of the Son as being the same "substance" (consubstantialis) as the Father. In 1215, the Fourth Lateran Council used the word transubstantiated in its profession of faith and stated the following on the doctrine:

His body and blood are truly contained in the sacrament of the altar under the forms of bread and wine, the bread and wine having been changed in substance, by God’s power, into his body and blood, so that in order to achieve this mystery of unity we receive from God what he received from us. Nobody can effect this sacrament except a priest who has been properly ordained according to the church’s keys, which Jesus Christ himself gave to the apostles and their successors.

==== Cannibalism claims ====
Critics of the Eucharist have at times characterized the doctrine of Christ's real presence as a form of cannibalism, often to portray the practice as immoral or to discredit it. One interpreter of Søren Kierkegaard's Eucharistic writings has used his notion of "a teleological suspension of the ethical,"—in which "the ethical is suspended by a higher power, a direct divine mandate"—to argue that, within such a framework, ritual or spiritual forms of cannibalism could be seen as superseding ordinary moral rules against cannibalism. Early Christian sources also recognized the challenging nature of Jesus' teaching on eating his flesh and drinking his blood; according to the Gospel of John, some of his disciples said, "This is a hard teaching. Who can accept it?" and "many of his disciples turned back and no longer followed him". One scholar argues that the Eucharist unites "the most positive and holiest as well as the most horrible and taboo-ridden aspects of eating and nourishment", a combination that contributes to what makes "the Eucharist so very powerful". Father Wayne Stock emphasizes that this is a spiritual reality: "[W]e are not taking pieces of meat off of his body but instead eating bread that has been transformed into his body" since "[H]is body is neither killed nor destroyed".

===== Minister of the sacrament =====
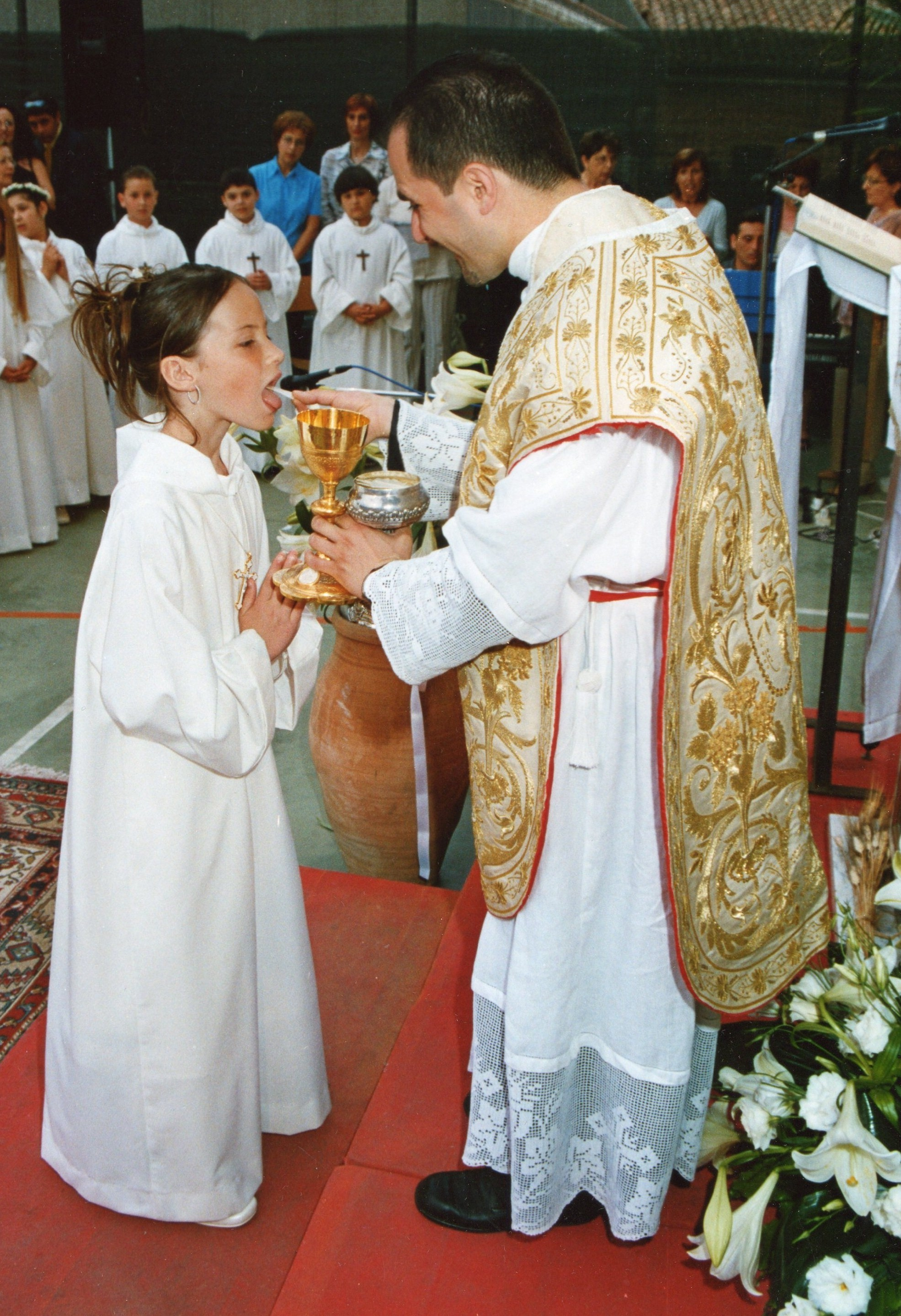
Catholic priest in Sicily distributing the Eucharist to a child at her first Holy Communion

According to Catholic teaching, only a validly ordained priest or bishop can consecrate the Eucharist and preside at its celebration, acting in the person of Christ. In the Latin Church, lay faithful may serve as extraordinary ministers of Holy Communion, distributing the sacrament when "there are no ordained ministers present", when ordained ministers are unable to distribute it, or when there are "particularly large numbers of the faithful"; however, they have no power to consecrate the bread and wine.

=== Rules and obligations ===
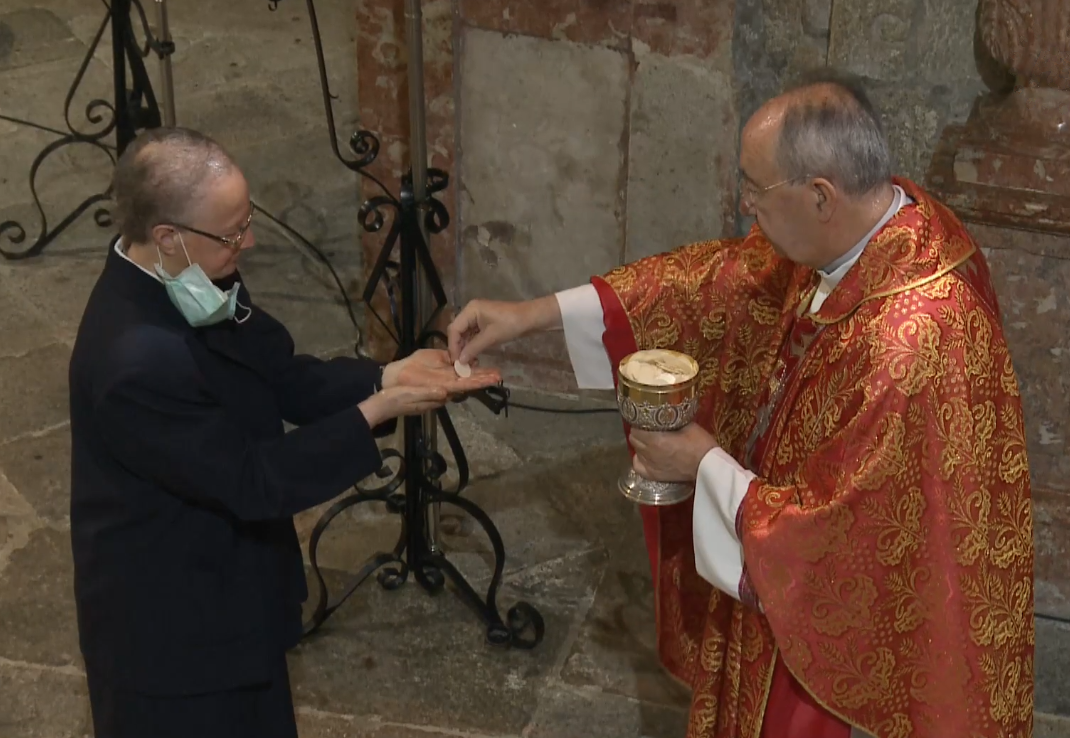
Communion administered in the hand, during the COVID-19 pandemic.

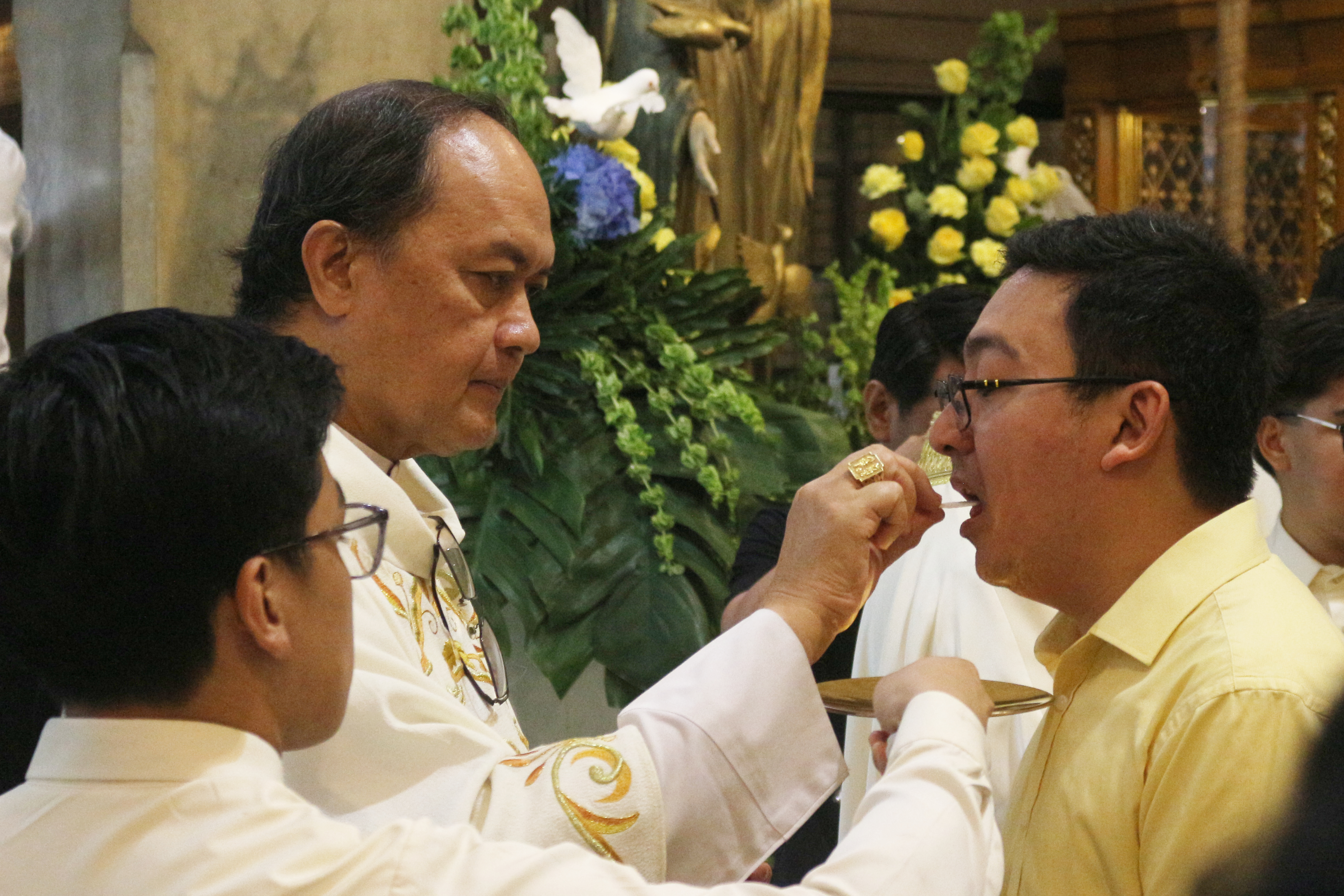
Communion administered on the tongue; an altar server holds a paten under the communicant's chin to catch any falling fragments.

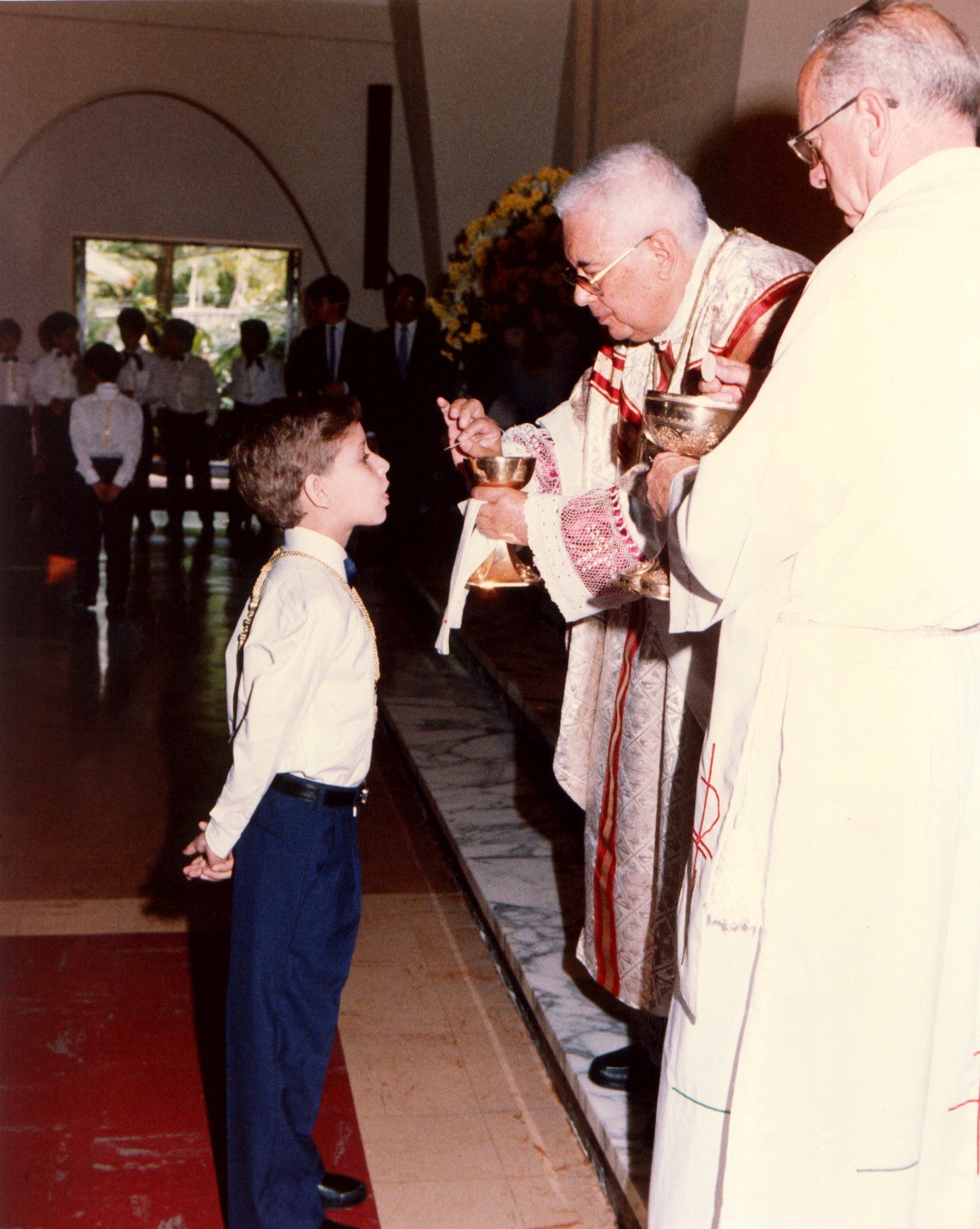
In the Western Church, the administration of the Eucharist to children requires that they have sufficient knowledge and preparation to be able to receive the body of Christ with faith and devotion.

Because the Eucharist is held to be the real presence of the body and blood of Christ and the central act of Catholic worship, the Catholic Church prescribes specific rules and obligations for the faithful regarding its reception. The Eucharist may be celebrated on most days of the year; on Good Friday, however, no Mass is offered and Communion is distributed from hosts consecrated at the Mass of the Lord’s Supper on Holy Thursday. A person may not receive the Eucharist in a state of mortal sin, as this would be sacrilege, unless "he has a grave reason for receiving Communion and there is no possibility of going to confession," as provided in canon law, a norm traditionally linked to 1 Corinthians 11:27-29. Catholic teaching holds that the principal fruit of the Eucharist is an intimate union with Christ Jesus, together with other spiritual gifts. In addition, Catholics are obliged to receive the Eucharist at least once per year, preferably during the Easter season, and, in the Latin Church, to abstain from food and drink (except water and medicine) for at least one hour before Communion. Eastern Catholics follow the fasting norms of their own Churches, which generally prescribe a longer period of preparation. In the Latin Church, communicants are to make an outward sign of reverence—such as a bow of the head—before receiving, and may receive either on the tongue or in the hand. A Catholic may receive Communion either during Mass or outside of Mass and may receive it a second time in one day, provided the second reception occurs within a Mass in which the person participates.

For children, canon law requires "sufficient knowledge and careful preparation... to receive the body of Christ with faith and devotion". However, Communion may be administered to children "in danger of death" if "they can distinguish the body of Christ from ordinary food" and receive it reverently. In many dioceses in the United States and Canada, children typically receive their First Communion around the age of seven or eight (often in second grade), whereas in many Eastern Catholic Churches the Eucharist is given to infants immediately after Baptism and Chrismation. Holy Communion may be received under one kind (either the consecrated host or the chalice) or under both kinds; the Church teaches that "Holy Communion has a fuller form as a sign when it is distributed under both kinds," but that those who receive "even under only one species… are not deprived of any of the grace necessary for salvation". The diocesan bishop may permit Communion under both kinds whenever it is appropriate and there is "no danger of profanation of the Sacrament" or of the rites "becoming difficult". In the Mass, a Communion plate may be used when the faithful receive, in order to "avoid the danger of the sacred host or some fragment of it falling".

The bread for the Eucharist must be made solely from wheat, and the wine must be natural grape wine and not corrupt. In the Latin, Armenian, and Ethiopic rites, the bread is unleavened, whereas it is leavened in most Eastern Catholic Churches. A small quantity of water is added to the wine in the preparation of the chalice. The Congregation for Divine Worship has issued guidance on the character of bread and wine to be used in the Mass, including norms for low‑gluten hosts and for the use of mustum (minimally fermented grape juice) in particular cases.

According to canon law, validly baptized non‑Catholics may receive the Eucharist only in special situations. Members of Eastern Churches not in full communion with Rome may be admitted if they seek the sacrament of their own accord, manifest Catholic faith in it, and are properly disposed. Other baptized Christians may receive only in cases of danger of death or other grave necessity, when they cannot approach a minister of their own community, provided they manifest Catholic faith in the Eucharist, request it on their own, and are properly disposed; in all such cases, care is to be taken to avoid any appearance of indifferentism.

== Devotion, adoration, and benediction ==
=== Devotion ===
In Catholic devotional practice, there are First Friday and, in some places, First Thursday devotions closely associated with the Eucharist. First Friday devotions, linked to the Sacred Heart of Jesus, typically involve attending Mass and receiving Communion, along with other practices such as a Holy Hour of meditation during the exposition of the Blessed Sacrament; devotional literature associated with this practice speaks of various spiritual "promises," including final perseverance, for those who observe it faithfully.

Some private devotions observed on First Thursdays focus on reparation for the Holy Wounds of Christ and are associated, in their devotional literature, with promises such as salvation at the moment of death. In one such devotion, the practice is carried out on the first Thursdays of six consecutive months, symbolically linked to Jesus’ five wounds of the crucifixion and his shoulder wound. These devotions typically include meditation on the wounds of Jesus and the Sorrows of Mary, and they encourage reception of the Eucharist with sincere humility, fervor, and love. One theological reflection on such practices emphasizes that the "great themes of the liturgy (resurrection, hope, and God’s love) should flow over into the family," so that "the private devotions of our daily lives" may "form a bridge leading back to the common assembly."

=== Adoration and benediction ===
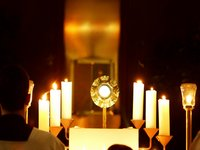
Host displayed in a monstrance, flanked by candles while the Eucharist is adored by a kneeling altar server

The adoration and benediction of the Eucharist have developed as practices of devotion in the Catholic Church; exposition of the Eucharist involves displaying the consecrated host on an altar in a monstrance, while the host is ordinarily reserved in the tabernacle after Mass. According to Catholic authors, Eucharistic adoration and meditation are not limited to gazing at the host but are understood as an extension of the Eucharistic celebration, grounded in the belief that Christ is truly present in the consecrated host. Meditation performed in the presence of the Eucharist is called Eucharistic meditation and has been practiced by numerous saints, such as Peter Julian Eymard, Jean Vianney, and Thérèse of Lisieux as well as by authors including Venerable Concepcion Cabrera de Armida and Blessed Maria Candida of the Eucharist.

Perpetual adoration consists in the constant exposition and adoration of the Eucharist, typically maintained by resident monks or nuns, or by volunteer parishioners in a parish. In 1991, the Pontifical Council for the Laity issued specific guidelines for perpetual adoration in parishes, stating that the parish priest must obtain permission "from his Bishop by submitting a request… with the required information for the local 'perpetual adoration association'”. Many popes have encouraged Eucharistic adoration outside Mass since the Middle Ages; Pope John Paul II described it as of "inestimable value for the life of the Church" and expressed the wish for a "perpetual adoration chapel in every parish," while Pope Benedict XVI established perpetual adoration chapels for the laity in each of the five districts of the Diocese of Rome. The Church approves private devotional adoration, individually or in groups, and other Catholic devotions derived from the sacred liturgy, which, according to official teaching, can "lead the people to it".
