= Concilium (journal) =

Catholic theological journal begun in 1965

- Discipline: Theology
- Language: English

Publication details
- History: 1965 to present
- Publisher: International Association of Conciliar Theology
- Frequency: 5/year

Standard abbreviations
- ISO 4: Concilium

Indexing
- ISSN: 0010-5236

Links
- Journal homepage

Concilium is an academic journal of Catholic theology. It was established in 1965 by the publishing firm T&T Clark and is published five times a year. The journal was established by Anton van den Boogaard, a Dutch businessman who served as treasurer and President of the Concilium Foundation, Paul Brand, Yves Congar, Hans Küng, Johann Baptist Metz, Karl Rahner, Henri de Lubac, Hans Urs von Balthasar, and Edward Schillebeeckx. Balthasar and de Lubac later resigned and founded Communio, which became the rival journal of Concilium.

It is published in six languages: Croatian, English, German, Italian, Portuguese, and Spanish.

Concilium aims at promoting theological discussion in the "spirit of Vatican II" from which it was born. Progressive theologians of the Concilium school favored the indigenization of the church and the importance of the local church.

Concilium is a Catholic journal, but is open to other Christian theological traditions and non-Christian faiths.

Concilium was awarded the Herbert Haag Prize for 2015 by the Herbert Haag Foundation for Freedom in the Church.

== See also ==
- Aggiornamento
- List of theological journals
