= Yves Congar =

French Catholic cardinal (1904–1995)

His Eminence Yves Congar OP
- Cardinal Deacon of the Basilica of San Sebastiano al Palatino
- Church: Latin Church
- Appointed: 26 November 1994
- Term ended: 22 June 1995

Orders
- Ordination: 25 July 1930 by Bishop Luigi Maglione
- Created cardinal: 26 November 1994
- Rank: Cardinal Deacon

Personal details
- Born: 13 April 1904 Sedan, Ardennes, France
- Died: 22 June 1995 (aged 91) Paris, France
- Denomination: Catholic Church
- Coat of arms

Yves Marie-Joseph Congar OP (French pronunciation: [iv maʁi ʒozɛf kɔ̃ɡaʁ]; 13 April 1904 – 22 June 1995) was a French Catholic cardinal and theologian. He is perhaps best known for his influence at the Second Vatican Council and for reviving theological interest in the Holy Spirit for the life of individuals and of the Church. He was created a cardinal in 1994.

== Early life ==
Congar was born in Sedan in northeast France in 1904. His father Georges Congar was a bank manager. Congar's hometown was occupied by German military forces for much of World War I, and his father was among the men deported to Lithuania. Upon the urging of his mother, Lucie Congar née Desoye (called "Tere" by Yves throughout his life), Congar recorded the occupation in an extensive series of illustrated diaries which were later published. They provide a unique historical insight into the war from a child's point of view.

Encouraged by a local priest Daniel Lallement, Congar entered the diocesan seminary. Moving to Paris in 1921, he had Jacques Maritain among his philosophy teachers and the Dominican theologian Reginald Garrigou-Lagrange as a retreat master.

== Priest and prisoner-of-war ==
After a year of compulsory military service (1924–1925), which Congar spent in the Rhineland, in 1925 he joined the Dominican Order at Amiens, where he took Marie-Joseph as his name in religion. Towards the end of his theological studies from 1926 to 1931 at Le Saulchoir, the Dominican theologate which was then located in Kain-la-Tombe, Belgium, and focused on historical theology, Congar was ordained a priest on 25 July 1930 by Luigi Maglione, nuncio in Paris. In 1931 Congar defended his doctoral dissertation written at Le Saulchoir, on the unity of the Church.

Congar was a faculty member at Le Saulchoir from 1931 to 1939, moving with the Institution in 1937 from Kain-la-Tombe to Étiolles near Paris. In 1932 he began his teaching career as Professor of Fundamental Theology, conducting a course on ecclesiology. Congar was influenced by the Dominicans Ambroise Gardeil and Marie-Dominique Chenu, by the writings of Johann Adam Möhler, and by his ecumenical contacts with Protestant and Eastern Orthodox theologians. Congar concluded that the mission of the church was impeded by what he and Chenu termed "baroque theology."

In 1937 Congar founded the Unam Sanctam series, addressing historical themes in Catholic ecclesiology. These books called for a "return to the sources" to set theological foundations for ecumenism, and the series would eventually run to 77 volumes. He wrote for a wide variety of scholarly and popular journals, and published numerous books.

During World War II Congar was drafted into the French army as a chaplain with the rank of lieutenant. He was captured and held from 1940 to 1945 as a prisoner of war by the Germans in Colditz and Lübeck's Oflag, after repeated attempts to escape. Later he was made a Knight (Chevalier) of the French Legion of Honour, and awarded the Croix de Guerre. In addition he was awarded the Médaille des Évadés for his numerous escape attempts.

== Scholar and ecumenist ==
After the war, Congar continued to teach at Le Saulchoir, which had been returned to France, and to write, eventually becoming one of the most influential theologians of the 20th century on the topic of the Catholic Church and ecumenism.

Congar was an early advocate of the ecumenical movement, encouraging openness to ideas stemming from the Eastern Orthodox Church and Protestant Christianity. He promoted the concept of a "collegial" papacy and criticised the Roman Curia, ultramontanism, and the clerical pomp that he observed at the Vatican. He also promoted the role of lay people in the church. Congar worked closely with the founder of the Young Christian Workers, Joseph Cardijn, for decades.

From 1947 to 1956 Congar's controversial writing was restricted by the Vatican. One of his most important books—True and False Reform in the Church (1950) and all of its translations—were forbidden by Rome in 1952. Congar was prevented from teaching or publishing after 1954, during the pontificate of Pope Pius XII, following publication of an article in support of the worker-priest movement started by Jacques Loew in France. He was subsequently assigned to minor posts in Jerusalem, Rome, Cambridge and Strasbourg. Eventually, in 1956, Archbishop Jean Julien Weber of Strasbourg assisted Congar in returning to France.

Congar's reputation recovered in 1960 when Pope John XXIII invited him to serve on the preparatory theological commission of the Second Vatican Council. Although Congar had little influence on the preparatory schemas, as the council progressed his expertise was recognized and some would regard him as the single most formative influence on Vatican II. He was a member of several committees that drafted conciliar texts, an experience that he documented in great detail in his daily journal. The journal extended from mid-1960 to December 1965. Following his direction, his journal was not released until 2000, and was first published in 2002 as Mon Journal du Concile I-II, présenté et annoté par Éric Mahieu (two volumes). A one-volume English translation appeared in 2012. Congar also wrote a diary during his years of trouble with the Holy Office entitled "Journal d'un théologien 1946-1956, édité et presenté par Étienne Fouilloux." An English translation appeared in 2015; there is a prior Spanish translation.

After the council, Congar said "respecting many questions, the council remained incomplete. It began a work which is not finished, whether it is a matter of collegiality, of the role of the laity, of missions and even of ecumenism." Congar's work focused increasingly on the theology of the Holy Spirit (see Pneumatology), and his 3-volume work on the Spirit has become a classic. He was also a member of the International Theological Commission from 1969 to 1985.

Congar continued to lecture and write, publishing on topics including Mary, the Eucharist, lay ministry, and the Holy Spirit, as well as his diaries. His works include The Meaning of Tradition and After Nine Hundred Years which addresses the East-West Schism.

In 1963, Congar was diagnosed with a "diffuse disease of the nervous system" which caused weakness and numbness in his extremities. In 1985, the diagnosis was changed to a form of sclerosis which increasingly affected his mobility and writing ability, and made his scholarly research difficult. He became a resident at the Hôpital des Invalides in Paris from 1986.

== Cardinal and death ==
In November 1994 he was named a cardinal deacon by Pope John Paul II, shortly before his death on 22 June the following year. His remains were buried in Montparnasse Cemetery.

== Media portrayal ==
- Yves Congar is one of the 14 main characters of the series 14 - Diaries of the Great War. He is played by actor Antoine de Prekel.
- Featured in the documentary series The First World War (2003), Part 2, "Under The Eagle" from the 37-minute mark to the 39-minute mark.

== Selected works ==
- Chrétiens désunis: Principes d'un 'oecuménisme' catholique, (Paris: Éditions du Cerf, 1937), translated as Divided Christendom: a Catholic Study of the Problem of Reunion, trans MA Bousfield (London: Bles, 1939).
- Vraie et fausse réforme dans l’Eglise, (Paris: Editions du Cerf, 1950). A second edition was issued in 1968. Translated as True and False Reform in the Church, trans Paul Philibert (Collegeville, MN: Liturgical Press, 2011).
- Jalons pour une théologie du laicat (1953).
- Leur résistance, 195?
- La Tradition et les traditions: essai historique (Paris, 1960), issued in translation in Tradition and Traditions: An historical and a theological essay, trans. Michael Naseby and Thomas Rainborough (London, 1966).
- Aspects de l'oecuménisme (Bruxelles/Paris, 1962).
- La Foi et la Théologie (Tournai, 1962).
- The Mystery of the Temple, or the Manner of God's Presence to His Creatures from Genesis to the Apocalypse, trans Reginald Frederick Trevett (London, 1962).
- Pour une Église Servante et Pauvre (Paris: Les Editions du Cerf, 1963).
- La Tradition et les traditions: essai théologique (Paris, 1963), issued in translation in Tradition and Traditions: An historical and a theological essay, trans. Michael Naseby and Thomas Rainborough (London, 1966).
- Report from Rome: on the First Session of the Vatican Council, translated by A. Mason (London: Chapman, 1963).
- Report from Rome II: The Second Session of the Vatican Council (London: Chapman, 1964).
- Lay People in the Church, translated by Donald Attwater (London: Chapman, 1965).
- Dialogue Between Christians: Catholic Contributions to Ecumenism, trans Philip Loretz (London: G Chapman, 1966).
- Je crois en l'Esprit Saint, 3 vols, translated as I Believe in the Holy Spirit, 3 vols. (Paris: Les Editions du Cerf, 1979).
- Mon Journal du Concile (1946–1956), ed. with notes Éric Mahieu (Paris: Les Editions du Cerf, 2002).
- My Journal of the Council, English translation by Mary John Ronayne and Mary Cecily Boulding, Adelaide (ATF Theology, 2012).
