= Mysterium fidei (encyclical) =

1965 encyclical of Pope Paul VI

Mysterium fidei Latin for 'The Mystery of Faith' Encyclical of Pope Paul VI
- Signature date: 3 September 1965
- Subject: On the doctrine and worship of the Holy Eucharist
- Number: 3 of 7 of the pontificate
- Text: In Latin; In English

Mysterium Fidei is an encyclical letter of Pope Paul VI on the Eucharist, published in September 1965.

Mysterium Fidei was issued just as the closing session of the Second Vatican Council was beginning. Written in a stern and troubled tone, its purpose was to counter certain theological movements which Pope Paul perceived were gaining ground in the Roman Catholic Church. Using terminology such as "pastoral concern" and "anxiety", the letter sends a direct and unequivocal message to the church regarding the Eucharist. The Pope clearly feared that these novel teachings were threatening the Eucharistic piety which had marked the Catholic Church since the earliest centuries. To emphasize the centrality of the Eucharist in the church, the Pope echoed the words of Ignatius of Antioch, referring to the Blessed Sacrament the "medicine of immortality". The Pope acknowledged that there were many "real" presences of Christ, but that in the Communion bread this presence is real and "substantial".

The letter, however, received little attention as the world's interest was focused at the time on the final works of the council fathers, particularly Lumen gentium, issued in November of the same year at the conclusion of the Council.

== Issues causing "pastoral anxiety" ==
Paul VI felt very strongly that certain theological currents were threatening several Catholic doctrines and practices including:

- Masses celebrated in private
- Doctrine of transubstantiation
- Eucharistic devotions

== False teachings condemned ==
Pope Paul VI in the opening of the letter declares the following teachings are impermissible:

- "to emphasize what is called the 'communal' Mass to the disparagement of Masses celebrated in private"
- "to exaggerate the element of sacramental sign as if the symbolism, which all certainly admit in the Eucharist, expresses fully and exhausts completely the mode of Christ's presence in this sacrament"
- "to discuss the mystery of transubstantiation without mentioning ... the marvelous conversion of the whole substance of the bread into the Body and of the whole substance of the wine into the Blood of Christ, speaking rather only of what is called "transignification" and transfinalization"
- "to propose and act upon the opinion according to which, in the Consecrated Hosts which remain after the celebration of the Sacrifice of the Mass, Christ Our Lord is no longer present."

"These and similar opinions do great harm to the faith and devotion to the Divine Eucharist. And therefore, so that the hope aroused by the Council, that a flourishing of Eucharistic piety which is now pervading the whole Church, be not frustrated by this spread of false opinions"

== See also ==
- Lollard
