= Le Saulchoir =

Catholic theological school in France

Le Saulchoir, officially the Centre D'études du Saulchoir, is a Dominican school of theology in the order's province of France, established in 1904.

== History ==
After the expulsion from France in 1880, French Dominican friars went into exile in Spain and Austria; they were allowed to return in 1895, establishing themselves in the convent of Flavigny-sur-Ozerain. After the renewed expulsion in 1903, the Dominicans were exiled to Kain, Belgium. There, they established a studium generale in 1904 in the former Cistercian abbey Le Saulchoir. From there, they published two journals, Revue des Sciences philosophiques et théologiques (starting 1907) and the Bulletin thomiste (starting 1924, not to be confused with Revue thomiste, established in 1893).

In 1939, the Dominicans were allowed back into France and they established themselves in Étiolles (Essonne département), retaining the name of Le Saulchoir for their school. They remained in Étiolles until 1971, when they moved to the Couvent Saint-Jacques in Paris, where the Centre D'études du Saulchoir was established in 1992.
