= Theology of Pope Pius XII =

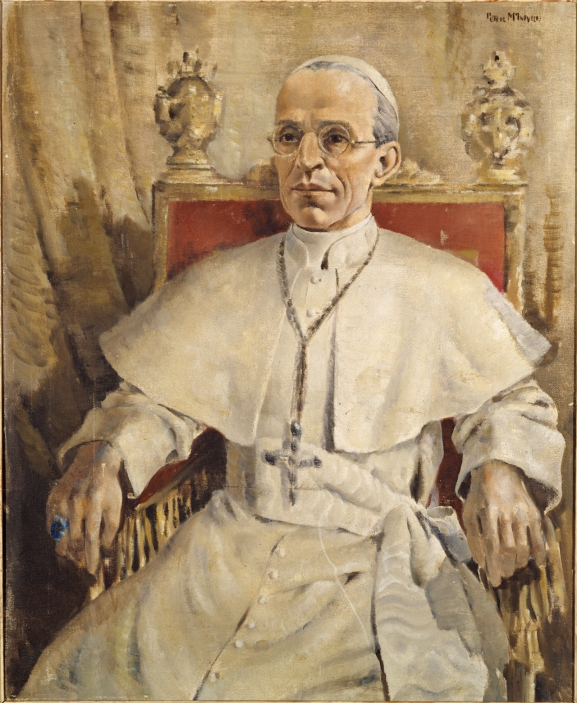
Pope Pius XII by Peter McIntyre c.1943-1944

The theology of Pope Pius XII is reflected in his forty-one encyclicals, as well as speeches and nearly 1000 messages, during his almost 20-year pontificate. The encyclicals Mystici corporis and Mediator Dei advanced the understanding of membership and participation in the Catholic Church. The encyclical Divino afflante Spiritu began opening the door to historical-critical biblical studies. But his magisterium was far larger and is difficult to summarize. In numerous speeches Catholic teaching is related to various aspects of life, education, medicine, politics, war and peace, the life of saints, Mary, the mother of God, things eternal and temporal.

== The Unity of Human Society ==
Addressing the problems of racism and anti-semitism in 1939, Pius XII said:

What a wonderful vision, which makes us contemplate the human race in the unity of its origin in God in the unity of its nature, composed equally in all men of a material body and a spiritual soul; in the unity of its immediate end and its mission in the world; in the unity of its dwelling, the earth, whose benefits all men, by right of nature, may use to sustain and develop life; in the unity of the redemption wrought by Christ for all. (Summi Pontificatus, 3)

In this first of his encyclicals, Summi Pontificatus, he developed one main theme of his pontificate. Christianity is universal, and therefore opposed to racial or national hostility and superiority. He continues this theme in other encyclicals, such as Mystici corporis and Mediator Dei, and in numerous speeches and addresses. There are no racial differences because the human race forms a unity, for "from one ancestor [God] made all nations to inhabit the whole earth".

Nations, despite a difference of development due to diverse conditions of life and of culture, are not destined to break the unity of the human race, but rather to enrich and embellish it by the sharing of their own peculiar gifts and by a reciprocal interchange. All races, the whole human race, are loved by Christ without exception or exclusion. Differences in nationality and race do not matter. True love means loving all, if they are Catholic, Christian, or not.

Oh, the teachings of Pius XII. He understood to adapt the magisterium of the Church to the most modern thinking.

— Pope John XXIII, referring to more than 8000 pages of papal teaching.

== The Church as the mystical body of Christ ==
"If we would define and describe this true Church of Jesus Christ – which is the One, Holy, Catholic, Apostolic and Roman Church – we shall find nothing more noble, more sublime, or more divine than the expression 'the Mystical Body of Christ' – an expression which springs from and is, as it were, the fair flowering of the repeated teaching of the Sacred Scriptures and the Holy Fathers."

The Church is called body, because she is a living entity, she is called the body of Christ, because Christ is her Head and Founder; she is called mystical body, because she is neither a purely physical nor a purely spiritual unity, but super-national. Pius XII builds on a theological development in the 1920s and 1930s in Italy, France, Germany and England, which all re-discovered the ancient Pauline concept of the Mystical Body of Christ. Pius XII accepted these new studies and authoritatively added his approval to them, utilizing the Dutch Jesuit Sebastian Tromp to write the encyclical.

The Church has two aspects, a visible and an invisible one. Full membership have those who live under the visible representative of Christ. The relation of the faithful with Christ is mystical, not physical. The faithful, through their faith hope and love, are united with Christ in the Church. Christ loves and lives in the faithful, the whole Church, which is alive through the Holy Spirit. Each of the faithful is guided by the Holy Spirit and therefore an equal and important element of the body of Christ. The unification with Christ takes place in the Holy Eucharist. Within the Church, there exist not an active and passive element, leadership and lay people. All members of the Church are called to work on the perfection of the body of Christ.

Lay believers are in the front line of Church life; for them the Church is the animating principle of human society. Therefore, they in particular ought to have an ever-clearer consciousness not only of belonging to the Church, but of being the Church, that is to say, the community of the faithful on earth under the leadership of the Pope, the common Head, and of the bishops in communion with him. They are the Church.

The differences between the Catholic Church and the Pauline notion of "Christ's body" will be further addressed in Vatican II's Constitution on the Church, Lumen Gentium (7).

== Liturgy reforms ==
In his encyclical Mediator Dei, Pope Pius links liturgy with the last will of Christ.

But it is His will, that the worship He instituted and practiced during His life on earth shall continue ever afterwards without intermission. For he has not left mankind an orphan. He still offers us the support of His powerful, unfailing intercession, acting as our "advocate with the Father." He aids us likewise through His Church, where He is present indefectibly as the ages run their course: through the Church which He constituted "the pillar of truth" and dispenser of grace, and which by His sacrifice on the cross, He founded, consecrated and confirmed forever.

The Church has, therefore, according to Pius XII, a common aim with Christ himself, teaching all people the truth, and offering to God a pleasing and acceptable sacrifice. This way, the Church re-establishes the unity between the Creator and creatures, a unity which turns strangers and foreigners; but you are fellow citizens of Christ. The sacrifice of the altar, being Christ's own actions, convey and dispense divine grace from Christ to the members of the Mystical Body.

Liturgy requires participation of the faithful. Pius rejects as sterile the widespread Catholic practices of private and interior devotions by individuals during Mass. They separate the faithful "from the sacrifice of the altar, and from the stream of vital energy that flows from Head to members". Catholic worship offers to God a joint profession of Catholic faith and a continuous exercise of hope and charity. The entire liturgy, therefore, has the Catholic faith as its content.

The numerous liturgy reforms of Pius XII show two characteristics. Renewal and the rediscovery of old liturgical traditions such as the reintroduction of the Easter Vigil, and a more structured atmosphere within the Church buildings. The use of vernacular language, accepted in certain cases by Pope Pius, was hotly debated at his time. He increased non-Latin services, especially in countries with expanding Catholic mission activities. After the Dogma of the Assumption, a new Mass formula was introduced for 15 August. The Sacred Congregation of Rites had jurisdiction over the rites and ceremonies of the Latin Church, such as Mass, sacred functions and divine worship. The location of the Blessed Sacrament within the Church was to be always at the main altar in the centre of the Church. The Church should display religious objects, but not be overloaded with secondary objects or even Kitsch. Modern sacred art should be reverential and reflect the spirit of our time. Priests are permitted to officiate marriages without Mass. They may also officiate confirmations in certain instances.

== Sacred Scriptures ==
In 1893, Pope Leo XIII issued in Providentissimus Deus instructions for biblical research. Fifty years later, Pius XII recalls the progress made. In his encyclical Divino afflante Spiritu, published in 1943, he encouraged Christian theologians to revisit original versions of the Bible in Greek and Hebrew. Noting improvements in archaeology, the encyclical reversed Pope Leo XIII's encyclical, which had only advocated going back to the original texts to resolve ambiguity in the Latin Vulgate. The encyclical demands a much better understanding of ancient Jewish history and traditions. It requires bishops throughout the Church to initiate biblical studies for lay people. The Pontiff also requests a reorientation of Catholic teaching and education, relying much more on sacred scripture in sermons and religious instruction.

== Mariology and the Dogma of the Assumption ==
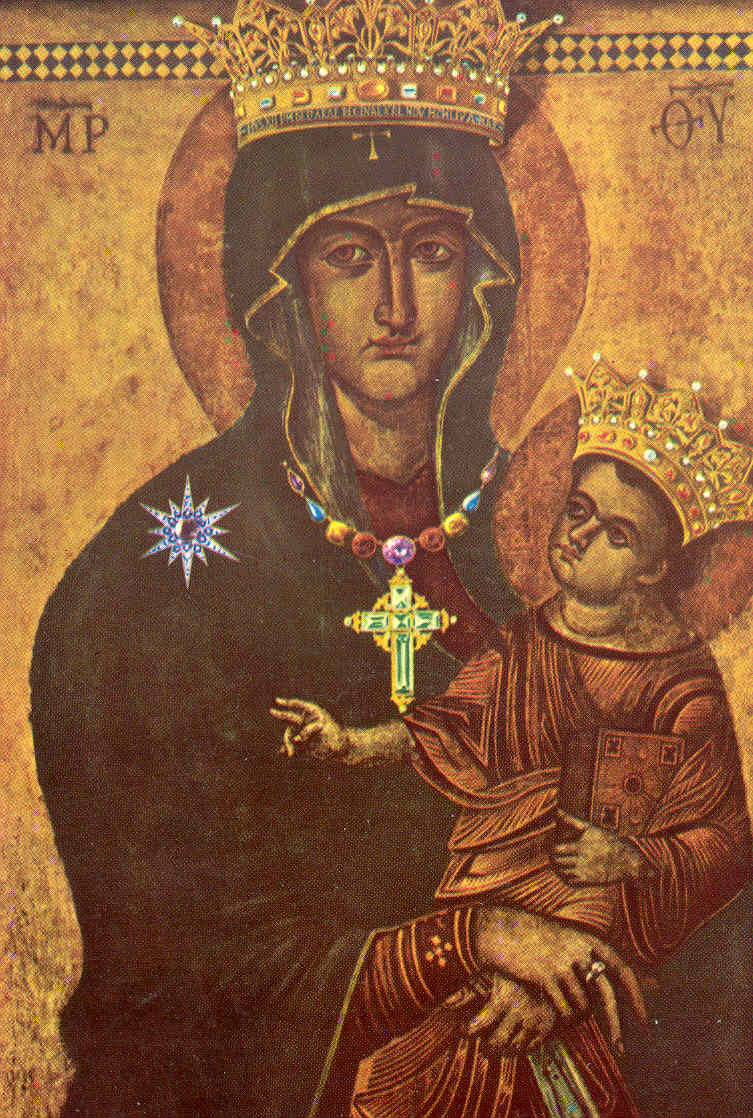
The Salus Populi Romani was venerated by Pope Pius XII. Here he celebrated his first Mass on 1 April 1899. A rare picture of Salus Populi Romani crowned for the Marian year 1954 by Pius XII

The 1854 dogma of the Immaculate Conception by Pius IX defined that the Virgin Mary was conceived without sin. Pope Pius XII built on this in Mystici corporis, which summarizes his mariology: Maria, whose sinless soul was filled with the divine spirit of Jesus Christ above all other created souls, "in the name of the whole human race" gave her consent "for a spiritual marriage between the Son of God and human nature," thus elevating human nature beyond the realm of the purely material. She who, according to the flesh, was the mother of our Head, became mother of all His members. Through her powerful prayers, she obtained that the spirit of our Divine Redeemer, should be bestowed on the newly founded Church at Pentecost. She is Most Holy Mother of all the members of Christ, and reigns in heaven with her Son, her heavenly body refulgent with heavenly glory.

On 1 November 1950, Pope Pius XII defined the dogma of the assumption:

By the authority of our Lord Jesus Christ, of the Blessed Apostles Peter and Paul, and by our own authority, we pronounce, declare, and define it to be a divinely revealed dogma: that the Immaculate Mother of God, the ever Virgin Mary, having completed the course of her earthly life, was assumed body and soul into heavenly glory.

The dogma of the bodily assumption of the Virgin Mary was preceded by the 1946 encyclical Deiparae Virginis Mariae, which requested all Catholic bishops to express their opinion on a possible dogmatization. In this dogmatic statement, the phrase "having completed the course of her earthly life" leaves open the question of whether the Virgin Mary died before her Assumption or whether she was assumed before death; but her body never corrupted. Mary's Assumption underscores the fact that her son was truly God.

As a young boy and in later life Eugenio Pacelli was an ardent follower of the Virgin Mary. On 8 September 1953, the encyclical Fulgens corona announced a Marian year for 1954, the centennial of the Dogma of the Immaculate Conception. Pope Pius XII left open the Mediatrix question, the role of the Virgin in the salvation acts of her son Jesus Christ. In the encyclical Ad caeli reginam he promulgated the feast Queenship of Mary. Pius XII, who was consecrated on 13 May 1917, the very day Our Lady of Fatima is believed to have first appeared, consecrated the world to the Immaculate Heart of Mary in 1942, in accordance with the second "secret" of Our Lady of Fatima. (His remains would be buried in the crypt of Saint Peter Basilica on the feast day of Our Lady of Fatima, 13 October 1958).

== Church and society ==
=== Medical theology ===
Pius XII delivered numerous speeches to medical professionals and researchers. Pio XII, Discorsi Ai Medici compiles 700 pages of specific addresses. Pope Pius XII addressed doctors, nurses, midwives, to detail all aspects of rights and dignity of patients, medical responsibilities, moral implications of psychological illnesses and the uses of psycho pharmaca, but also issues of uses of medicine in terminally ill persons, medical lies in face of grave illness, and the rights of family members to make decisions against expert medical advice. Pope Pius XII went often new ways, thus he was the first to determine that the use of pain medicine in terminally ill patients is justified, even if this may shorten the life of the patient, as long as life shortening is not the objective itself.

Other topics were the behaviour of medical doctors, facing pain and death, sterilisation, genetics, artificial insemination, painless child birth, the multiple moral aspects of developing medical technologies, morality in applied psychology, moral limits to medical research and treatment, and cancer treatment of children, and more.

=== Sexuality and conscience ===
Pope Pius XII fully accepted the rhythm method as a moral form of family planning, although only in limited circumstances, within the context of family. Internal rulings of the Catholic Church in 1853 and 1880 stated that periodic abstinence was a moral way to avoid pregnancy, but some historians consider these two speeches by Pius XII to be the first explicit Church acceptance of the method.

In his speech to mid-wives, Pope Pius XII offered this understanding of sexual pleasures: "The Creator himself ... established that in the [generative] function, spouses should experience pleasure and enjoyment of body and spirit. Therefore, the spouses do nothing evil in seeking this pleasure and enjoyment. They accept what the Creator has intended for them. At the same time, spouses should know how to keep themselves within the limits of just moderation."

To Pius XII, "The conscience is the innermost and most secret nucleus of man. There he withdraws with his intellectual capacities into complete separation, alone with himself or better, alone with God, whose voice echoes in his conscience. There he decides over good or bad. There chooses between victory or defeat. The conscience is therefore, to use an old, venerable picture, a sanctuary, on whose entrance all must stop." This respect applies to children and even more to adults: "It is correctly argued, that the true meaning of adult independence is not to be led like a little Child."

Vatican II picked up this quote on conscience from Pius XII verbatim in Lumen gentium, and concluded: "By conscience, in a wonderful way, that law is recognized, which is fulfilled in the love of God and neighbour." Since 1993, the Magisterium of the Church explicitly highlights this particular view of Pope Pius XII, quoting it as an element of the official Catholic Catechism.

The Catholic Church's modern view on family planning was further developed in the 1968 encyclical Humanae Vitae by Pope Paul VI and in Pope Benedict XVI's 2005 encyclical Deus caritas est.

=== Theology and Science ===
To Pius XII, science and religion were heavenly sisters, different manifestations of divine exactness, who could not possibly contradict each other over the long term Regarding their relation, his advisor Professor Robert Leiber wrote: "Pius XII was very careful not to close any doors prematurely. He was energetic on this point and regretted that in the case of Galileo." Preceding similar praises from Pope John Paul II in 1992, Pope Pius XII listed, in 1939, Galileo in his first speech to the Pontifical Academy of Sciences to be among "most audacious heroes of research ... not afraid of the stumbling blocks and the risks on the way, nor fearful of the funereal monuments."

In commenting on "the state and nature of original matter", Pius acknowledges that science declares this to be an "insoluble enigma", but continues that "it seems that science of today, by going back in one leap millions of centuries, has succeeded in being witness to that primordial Fiat Lux when, out of nothing, there burst forth with matter a sea of light and radiation, while the particles of chemical elements split and reunited in millions of galaxies". Pius continued that these facts need further investigation, and theories founded upon them need "new developments and proofs in order to offer a secure basis for reasoning".

==== Evolution ====
In 1950, Pope Pius XII teaches, there is no sufficient basis for a comprehensive belief in evolution, because the facts are still missing. Catholic religion can take evolution theory into account at some time: "This certainly would be praiseworthy in the case of clearly proved facts; but caution must be used when there is rather question of hypotheses, having some sort of scientific foundation, in which the doctrine contained in Sacred Scripture or in Tradition is involved."

The encyclical Humani generis took up a nuanced position with regard to evolution, saying that the origin of man's body from pre-existing and living matter is a legitimate matter of inquiry for natural science. Catholics are free to form their own opinions, but they should do so cautiously; they should not confuse fact with conjecture, and they should respect the Church's right to define matters touching on Revelation. "For these reasons the Teaching Authority of the Church does not forbid that, in conformity with the present state of human sciences and sacred theology, research and discussions on the part of men experienced in both fields take place with regard to the doctrine of evolution, in as far as it inquires into the origin of the human body as coming from pre-existent and living matter – for the Catholic faith obliges us to hold that souls are immediately created by God."

Thus Pius acknowledged in 1950 that evolution might accurately describe the biological origins of human life, but at the same time criticized those who use it as a religion, who "imprudently and indiscreetly hold that evolution ... explains the origin of all things". While Humani generis was significant as the first occasion on which a pope explicitly addressed the topic of evolution at length, it did not represent a change in doctrine for the Roman Catholic Church. As early as 1868, Cardinal John Henry Newman wrote, "the theory of Darwin, true or not, is not necessarily atheistic; on the contrary, it may simply be suggesting a larger idea of divine providence and skill."

Pope John Paul II went further in acknowledging the success of evolutionary theory in his 1996 Message to Pontifical Academy of Sciences. He called evolution "more than a hypothesis" and said, "It is indeed remarkable that this theory has been progressively accepted by researchers, following a series of discoveries in various fields of knowledge", but he maintained the line of his predecessor, Pope Pius XII, regarding the origin of the soul in God.

The encyclical issues a clear "no" to another scientific opinion currently popular in some circles, polygenism or multiregional origin of modern humans, "the scientific hypothesis that mankind descended from a group of original humans."

== Writings and speeches ==
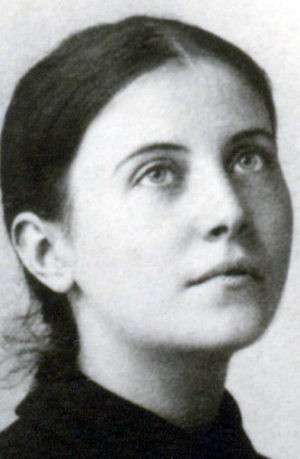
Gemma Galgani was canonized in 1940 by Pius XII.

The pontificate of Pius XII was the first in Vatican history to publish papal speeches and addresses in vernacular language on a systematic basis. Until then, papal documents were issued mainly in Latin, in Acta Apostolicae Sedis since 1909. Because of the novelty of it all, and a feared occupation of the Vatican by the German Wehrmacht, not all documents exist today. In 1944, a number of papal documents were burned or "walled in", to avoid detection by the advancing German army. Insisting that all publications must be reviewed by him on a prior basis to avoid any misunderstanding, several speeches by Pius XII, who did not find sufficient time, were never published or appeared only once issued in the Vatican daily, Osservatore Romano. An array of sources exists today, not all of them available in English. This applies especially to the many speeches and addresses to various groups. Available are:

- Acta Apostolicae Sedis. (AAS), Vatican City 1939–1958. Official documents of the Pontificate of Pope Pius XII
- Pio XII, Discorsi e Radio Messaggi di Sua Santita Pio XII, Vatican City 1939–1958, Official speeches of Pius XII, 20 vol.
- Pio XII, Discorsi Ai Medici collected by Fiorenzo Angelini, Roma, 1959, 725 pages, Italian, medical theology and morality.
- Soziale Summe Pius XII ed. A.F. Utz, J.F. Gröner, 4010 pages. in German, the non-theological teachings 1939–1958, 3 vol.
- Guide to the Documents of Pope Pius XII by M. Claudia, Westminster, Maryland, 1955, an English Guide until 1955;

A small percentage of the Pope Pius XII publications are available on internet on the Vatican Website.

== Canonizations and beatifications ==
Pope Pius XII canonized numerous saints, including Pope Pius X and Maria Goretti. He beatified Pope Innocent XI. The first canonizations were two women, the founder of a female order Mary Euphrasia Pelletier, and mystic Gemma Galgani. Pelletier had a reputation for opening new ways for Catholic charities, helping people in difficulties with the law, who so far were neglected by the system and the Church. Galgani was a rather unknown girl whose virtue became a model by her canonization.
