= Subsistit in =

Phrase in Lumen gentium

Subsistit in ("subsists in") is a Latin phrase which appears in Lumen gentium, the document on the church from the Second Vatican Council of the Catholic Church. Since the council, the reason for use of the term "subsists in" rather than simply "is" has been disputed. Generally, those who see little or no change in church teaching in Vatican II insist on the equivalence of subsistit in and "is". Those who point to a new, ecumenical thrust in Vatican II insist that the term was introduced as a compromise after much discussion, and acknowledges new elements in the council's teaching.

The context of the statement is (emphasis added):

This Church constituted and organized in the world as a society, subsists in the Catholic Church, which is governed by the successor of Peter and by the Bishops in communion with him, although many elements of sanctification and of truth are found outside of its visible structure. These elements, as gifts belonging to the Church of Christ, are forces impelling toward catholic unity.

— Lumen gentium, 8

This is a debate about externals, the institutional integrity of a church, the fullness of the means of salvation.

== Overview ==
=== Issue ===
The correct meaning of "subsists in" has important implications for how the Catholic Church views itself and its relations with other Christian communities and other religions. Questions have been raised about whether Lumen gentium altered the longstanding phrase according to which the Church of Christ is (Latin est) the Catholic Church.

Mystici corporis Christi states: "this true Church of Jesus Christ" and "the Mystical Body of Christ" is "the One, Holy, Catholic, Apostolic and Roman Church". This position was later reaffirmed in Humani generis.

Lumen gentium does recognize that other Christian ecclesial communities have elements of sanctification and of truth. And the Council used the traditional term "Church"— in the sense of "particular Church" and not "universal Church"— to refer to the Eastern Churches not in full communion with the Catholic Church. "These Churches", it says, "although separated from us, yet possess true sacraments and above all, by apostolic succession, the priesthood and the Eucharist, whereby they are linked with us in closest intimacy".

The Catholic Church used both the "subsists in" and "is" formula in the Second Vatican Council, stating in the Decree on the Eastern Churches: "The Holy Catholic Church, which is the Mystical Body of Christ, is made up of the faithful who are organically united in the Holy Spirit by the same faith, the same sacraments and the same government".

=== Development ===
Both before and after the 16th century Protestant Reformation, Catholic theology identified the Church of Christ with the Catholic Church. This continued through the teaching of popes Pius XI and Pius XII. At the Second Vatican Council, the preparatory draft for the Decree on the Church contained this long-held teaching, following Pius XII in identifying the Mystical Body of Christ with the Catholic Church.

The American ecclesiologist Joseph A. Komonchak chronicles this discussion of this teaching at the Council. According to him, the Council's Doctrinal Commission explained the change in the final draft of Lumen gentium from "is" to "subsists in", "so that the expression may better accord with the affirmation about ecclesial elements which are present elsewhere". Komonchak points out that since "some wanted to strengthen the statement, others to weaken it" the Doctrinal Commission of Vatican II decided to stay with the change of verb. He suggests that following "the first rule of conciliar hermeneutics", we should examine statements of Vatican II about these "ecclesial elements" found outside the Catholic Church. He mentions that the same document, Lumen gentium, preferred to speak of those "fully incorporated" into the church and avoided the term "membership", though without explaining why. It mentioned that "several elements of sanctification and of truth are found outside its visible structure". Such elements or vestiges mentioned as "present elsewhere" include the influence of the Spirit, aids to salvation, a partial profession of faith, and sacraments. This is reinforced in the decree on ecumenism (Unitatis redintegratio) which says: "Very many, of the most significant elements and endowments that together go to build up and to give life to the Church itself can exist outside the visible boundaries of the Catholic Church: the written Word of God, the life of grace, faith, hope, and charity, with other interior gifts of the Holy Spirit, as well as visible elements [...] [and] not a few of the sacred actions of the Christian religion". The decree then says that only the Catholic Church possesses "the fullness of the means of salvation".

Cardinal Walter Kasper has pointed out that, concerning the claim that the fullness of the Church of Christ resides in the Catholic Church, that this "does not refer to subjective holiness but to the sacramental and institutional means of salvation, the sacraments and the ministries."

== Ongoing dispute ==
=== Sebastian Tromp ===
Sebastian Tromp, a Dutch Jesuit, a Scholastic theologian and close to Pope Pius XII, is considered to have been the main though unacknowledged author of Mystici corporis Christi. As advisor to Cardinal Alfredo Ottaviani during Vatican II, Tromp was also, according to existing tape recordings and diaries, the father of "subsistit", which to his understanding of Latin did not mean anything new but indicated completeness. But Francis A. Sullivan pointed out:

If one considers the fact that the draft in which "est" had been changed to "subsistit in" was the first one that spoke of "Churches" and "ecclesiastical communities" that are found outside the Catholic Church, one can hardly escape the conclusion that the doctrinal commission did not agree with Tromp, who had forcefully insisted that "subsistit in" must be understood to be exclusivum, with the consequence that outside the Catholic Church there could be nothing but elements.

=== Congregation for the Doctrine of the Faith ===
In a 1985 notification on a book of Catholic priest Leonardo Boff, the Congregation for the Doctrine of the Faith stated:

[Boff's] relativizing concept of the Church stands at the basis of the radical criticisms directed at the hierarchic structure of the Catholic Church. In order to justify it, L. Boff appeals to the constitution Lumen Gentium (No. 8) of the Second Vatican Council. From the Council's famous statement, 'Haec ecclesia (sc. unica Christi Ecclesia)...subsistit in Ecclesia Catholica' ('this Church (that is, the sole Church of Christ)...subsists in the Catholic Church'), he derives a thesis which is exactly the contrary to the authentic meaning of the Council text, for he affirms: 'In fact it (sc. the sole Church of Christ) may also be present in other Christian Churches' (p. 75). But the Council had chosen the word subsistit – subsists – exactly in order to make clear that one sole 'subsistence' of the true Church exists, whereas outside her visible structure only elementa Ecclesiae – elements of Church – exist; these – being elements of the same Church – tend and conduct toward the Catholic Church (Lumen Gentium, 8). The decree on ecumenism expresses the same doctrine (Unitatis Redintegratio, 3-4), and it was restated precisely in the declaration Mysterium Ecclesiae

In Dominus Iesus (2000), the Congregation for the Doctrine of the Faith stated: "With the expression subsistit in, the Second Vatican Council sought to harmonize two doctrinal statements: on the one hand, that the Church of Christ, despite the divisions which exist among Christians, continues to exist fully only in the Catholic Church, and on the other hand, that 'outside of her structure, many elements can be found of sanctification and truth', that is, in those Churches and ecclesial communities which are not yet in full communion with the Catholic Church. But with respect to these, it needs to be stated that 'they derive their efficacy from the very fullness of grace and truth entrusted to the Catholic Church'. [...] Therefore, there exists a single Church of Christ, which subsists in the Catholic Church, governed by the Successor of Peter and by the Bishops in communion with him."

In a 2007 an official responsa, the Congregation for the Doctrine of the Faith described the use of "subsistit" as follows: "In number 8 of the Dogmatic Constitution Lumen gentium 'subsistence' means this perduring, historical continuity and the permanence of all the elements instituted by Christ in the Catholic Church, in which the Church of Christ is concretely found on this earth. [...] [T]he word 'subsists' can only be attributed to the Catholic Church alone precisely because it refers to the mark of unity that we profess in the symbols of the faith (I believe... in the 'one' Church); and this 'one' Church subsists in the Catholic Church".

Some identified what they considered to be inconsistencies in the Congregation's own 2007 responsa, and pointed out that it was at variance with several prominent theologians who took a more liberal interpretation, such as Christopher Butler, Yves Congar, Georges Tavard, Joseph A. Komonchak, and Francis A. Sullivan.

=== Cardinal Ratzinger ===
In a 2000 interview with Frankfurter Allgemeine Zeitung, then-Cardinal Ratzinger, head of the Congregation for the Doctrine of the Faith (later elected Pope Benedict XVI), responded to criticism of Dominus Iesus as follows:

The concept expressed by "is" (to be) is far broader than that expressed by "to subsist". "To subsist" is a very precise way of being, that is, to be as a subject, which exists in itself. Thus the Council Fathers meant to say that the being of the Church as such is a broader entity than the Roman Catholic Church, but within the latter it acquires, in an incomparable way, the character of a true and proper subject.

=== Avery Dulles ===
Cardinal Dulles argues subsitit in to be "an expression deliberately chosen to allow for the ecclesial reality of other Christian communities", implying that non-Catholic Christians are members of the Body of Christ, and thus of the Church.

=== Hervé Legrand ===
Catholic priest Hervé Legrand states that the part concerning subsistit in within the 1985 notification concerning Leonard Boff's books, as well as within Dominus Iesus, are wrong. He states that "recourse to the Acta Synodalia [of Vatican II] makes it possible to establish, with almost absolute certainty, that the recourse to the verb 'to subsist' was done in order to avoid the exclusive identification between the Church of Christ and the Catholic Church", and that "the decision taken in commission offers no trace of a scholastic meaning given to the term subsistit, but it offers evidence of the use of this word to avoid the pure and simple identification between the Church of Christ and our [Catholic] Church".

=== Society of Saint Pius X ===
The Society of Saint Pius X consider Lumen gentium one of several demarcations of when the post-Vatican II Church has issued problematic statements, pointing to the use of "subsistit in" rather than "est" as an abdication of the Catholic Church's (to the SSPX compulsory) identification of itself alone as God's church.

The SSPX refers, in particular, to the encyclicals Mystici corporis (1943) and Humani generis (1950) by Pope Pius XII, which assert that the Church of Christ and the Catholic Church are perfectly identical.

They also refer to Pope Pius XI's Mortalium Animos (1928), claiming that it states that non-Catholic communities belong to a false Christian religion, completely foreign to the one Church of Christ.

== See also ==
- Extra Ecclesiam nulla salus
- Hermeneutics of the Second Vatican Council
