= Corpus Mysticum =

1944 book by Henri de Lubac

First edition (publ. Aubier)

Corpus Mysticum: L'Eucharistie et l’Église au moyen âge was a book written by Henri de Lubac, published in Paris in 1944. The book aimed to, in de Lubac's words, retrieve the doctrine that "the Church makes the eucharist and the eucharist makes the church."

== Plot ==
The book traces patristic and medieval uses of the Latin phrase corpus mysticum ("mystical body"). In de Lubac's time, especially as evidenced in Pope Pius XII's 1943 encyclical Mystici corporis Christi, this phrase was typically used to refer to the Church as the "mystical body" of Christ.

From his historical study, however, de Lubac argued that the phrase corpus mysticum referred initially to Christ's eucharistic body, and not to the visible Church as an institution. This association had been lost in the late medieval period. De Lubac argued that it was important to recover the pre-modern understanding of corpus mysticum, according to which Christ should be regarded as mystically present and at work where and when the eucharist was being celebrated.

== Reception ==
De Lubac's argument did not have great immediate impact, but was hugely influential in the eucharistic ecclesiology developed (or rehabilitated) at Vatican II.

== Editions ==
- Corpus Mysticum: Essai sur L'Eucharistie et l’Église au moyen âge (Paris, 1944)
- English Translation: Corpus Mysticum: The Eucharist and the Church in the Middle Ages, trans. Gemma Simmonds with Richard Price and Christopher Stephens (London, 2006)
