= Surnaturel =

1946 book by Henri de Lubac

Surnaturel is a book written by the Roman Catholic theologian Henri de Lubac. It stands among his most famous and controversial works.

In this book he traces the historical meaning of the word 'supernatural' and notes a shift in implication. Up to the High Middle Ages, the essential contrast was drawn between 'natural' and 'moral'. After that, the contrast was seen between 'natural and supernatural'. De Lubac is trying here to establish the correct understanding of Aquinas on this subject.

== Context ==
De Lubac began work on the ideas which would eventually appear as Surnaturel in his days as a student in Hastings. De Lubac published several articles in the 1930s which were to make up much of Surnaturel. The development of the book itself, though, was greatly hindered by the war. In June 1940, fleeing the advancing Nazis, de Lubac left Lyon with a bag which included the notebook for Surnaturel, on which he worked for several days. De Lubac stated in later years that the book had taken sufficient shape by 1941 to be ready for review; the nihil obstat was granted in February 1942. However, paper shortages prevented publication. In 1943, while being hunted by the Gestapo, de Lubac fled, again carrying his notebook, this time to Vals. He used the resources in the Vals library to continue his work on the book. Eventually, in October 1945 the Imprimatur was issued, and in 1946, the book was published (though only as an edition of 700 copies, due to ongoing paper shortages).

== Argument ==
De Lubac's overall question in Surnaturel is therefore how human persons in the natural order can be interiorly directed to the order of grace that fulfils them, without in the least possessing this grace in anticipation, and without being able at all to claim it for themselves. In the book, de Lubac attempts to show how, in an attempt to answer this question, what he calls "the system of pure nature" had come to prevail in Catholic theology.

He argues that in the Fathers and the great scholastics there was only one concrete order of history, that in which God had made humanity for himself, and in which human nature had thus been created only for a single destiny, which was supernatural. Neither the Fathers nor the scholastics, therefore, ever envisioned the possibility of a purely natural end for human persons attainable by their own intrinsic powers of cognition and volition.

De Lubac argues that this unified vision began to unravel in the thought of theologians such as Denys the Carthusian and, more pertinently, Cajetan. While Denys had argued for a natural end of the human person to which a supernatural end must be 'superadded', he did so consciously in opposition to the teaching of Thomas Aquinas. Cajetan, however, while making a similar argument to Denys, did so while claiming simply to be commenting on Thomas: he therefore introduced the idea of human nature as "a closed and sufficient whole" into Thomism.

The idea of a 'pure nature', argues de Lubac, intensified in the wake of the naturalism of Baius and Jansenius: a state of pure nature - a hypothesis according to which human persons might have been created with an end proportionate to their natural powers - was seen as necessary to protect the gratuity of the supernatural. Affirmation of such a state, argued de Lubac, overlooked the decisive difference between the created human spirit and other natures. Moreover, while allowing Catholic theologians to defend the essential integrity of fallen human nature against the Protestantism that denied it, the system effected a separation between nature and the supernatural that would prove pernicious - by rendering the latter (seemingly) superfluous. Although, de Lubac argues, the system of 'pure nature' was perceived to be a novelty when it first developed, it eventually came to be taken for granted, such that, by the twentieth century, rejecting it became synonymous with denying the gratuity of the supernatural.

Surnaturel is broken into four parts, which are pieced together from a number of earlier preparatory studies.

- The first part, entitled 'Augustinianism and Baianism', examines the interpretation of Augustine by Baius and Jansenius, showing how these two early modern thinkers misconstrue Augustine's true intention. That is, de Lubac argued that, influenced by a juridical-naturalistic way of thinking foreign to Augustine (and to his disciples, including Thomas Aquinas), Baius and Jansenius in their different ways denied the gratuity of the gifts made by God to Adam. De Lubac shows how the hypothesis of 'purely natural finality' attributed to a 'purely spiritual nature' was developed to insure this gratuity.
- The second part, 'Spirit and Freedom in the Theological Tradition', examines one of the essential aspects of the spiritual 'nature' (both human and angelic), namely, its freedom of choice with respect to its end. De Lubac considers the tradition from the Fathers up to the seventeenth century, and provides further evidence for the claim that Aquinas, for example, never envisioned any finality for the created spirit but a supernatural one.
- The third part examines the origins of the word 'supernatural', including the problematic epithet 'superadditum' ('something superadded'), and the confusion of the 'supernatural' with the 'miraculous' (in the sense of a completely arbitrary addition). De Lubac shows in this section that the term 'supernatural' was first used systematically by St Thomas.
- The fourth part offers six 'Historical Notes' on St Thomas and his followers.
- In the conclusion, 'Divine Exigence and Natural Desire', de Lubac indicates why it is unnecessary to have recourse to the hypothetical system of pure nature to protect the gratuity of the beatific vision.

== Impact ==
The publication of the work caused immediate controversy in Catholic thought. De Lubac's thought came to be associated as representing a Nouvelle théologie, a name applied to de Lubac's thought by his critics. In 1950, de Lubac was asked by the General of the Jesuits to stop teaching, and to give up working at the journal Recherches de Science Religieuse. An order was issued to withdraw from Jesuit libraries and from the trade three of his books - Surnaturel, Corpus Mysticum and De la Connaissance de Dieu, as well as a 1949 article in Recherches in which de Lubac addressed some criticisms of Surnaturel. Two months later, it was widely suspected that it was his views which were attacked in the papal encyclical Humani Generis. De Lubac was ostracised for a decade.

In the early 1960s, however, his ideas became more accepted in the Catholic hierarchy, and he was among the first summoned by Pope John XXIII to help draft the texts for Vatican II.

In 1965 de Lubac published two works: Le Mystere du surnaturel, and Augustinisme et théologie moderne, which served primarily to clarify numerous objections to Surnaturel. Mystere largely followed the structure of the 1949 article with the same title in which de Lubac had responded to some criticisms of Surnaturel. Augustinisme was a reprint of the first part of Surnaturel, enlarged with some new texts.

== Editions ==
- Surnaturel: Études historiques, (Paris: Aubier, 1946).
- A new French edition issued by (Paris: Desclée de Brouwer, 1991) contains a complete translation into French of all Greek and Latin citations.
- There is not yet (as of 2025) an English translation, however the first part of it is available as Augustinianism and Modern Theology, and the text is very similar...
