= Nota praevia (term) =

A nota praevia (Latin for "preliminary note") is an illustrative introductory section of a document or book.

The best known such nota praevia is the nota explicativa praevia (preliminary note of explanation) of 16 November 1964, which accompanies the text of the Second Vatican Council's dogmatic constitution Lumen gentium. It was issued by Pope Paul VI as a preliminary note that preceded the responses given to certain proposals for amendment of the draft document, but was then included as an appendix at the end of the final text document. On this, see Lumen gentium#Collegiality (chapter III).

Other documents of the Holy See that have a nota praevia include the Norms of the Sacred Congregation for the Doctrine of the Faith on how to proceed when judging alleged apparitions and revelations of 25 February 1978. This nota praevia dealt with the origins and character of the norms in question.

Examples of books with a nota praevia are the 1992 official overview of the Order of Preachers and Cristianità, modernità, Rivoluzione, by Marco Tangheroni, published in 2009, with a nota praevia by Andrea Bartelloni.

A nota praevia is prefixed to C.M. Bettinotti's study, "Las Cardiopatías y la Enfermedad de Chagas. Estudio serológico" in American trypanosomiasisII. Current serologic studies in Chagas' disease. The Journal of Pediatrics, Volume 58, Issue 5, Pages 738-745. Another medical study is entitled Tratiamento quirúrgico de la lesion crónica del seno tarso. Nota praeviapublished in Actualité Med. Chir. du Pied, Masson, Paris, 1978, pp. 173-179.

The term nota praevia is used also in political documents such as the report presented in 2003 to the Organization for Security and Co-operation in Europe by the Canadian rapporteur of its General Commission for Political and Security Affairs.
