= Mystici Corporis Christi =

1943 encyclical issued by Pope Pius XII

Mystici Corporis Christi Latin for 'The Mystical Body of Christ' Encyclical of Pope Pius XII
- Signature date: 29 June 1943
- Subject: On the Mystical Body of Christ and the Church
- Number: 4 of 41 of the pontificate
- Text: In Latin; In English
- AAS: 35 (7):193-248

Mystici Corporis Christi (The Mystical Body of Christ) is an encyclical issued by Pope Pius XII on 29 June 1943 during World War II. Its main topic is the Catholic Church as the Mystical Body of Christ.

The encyclical is remembered for its statement that the Mystical Body of Christ is the Catholic Church. According to Mystici corporis, to be truly a member of the mystical body, one must be a member of the Catholic Church. Non-Catholics who erred in good faith could be unsuspectingly united to the mystical body by an unconscious desire and longing.

According to the Jesuit theologian Avery Dulles, Mystici Corporis was "the most comprehensive official Catholic pronouncement on the Church prior to Vatican II". Its primary writer Sebastiaan Tromp drew mainly on the first schema of Vatican I and on the encyclicals of Leo XIII. It de-emphasized papal jurisdiction, but insisted on the visibility of the church and warned against an excessively mystical understanding of the union between Christ and the Church.

== Background ==
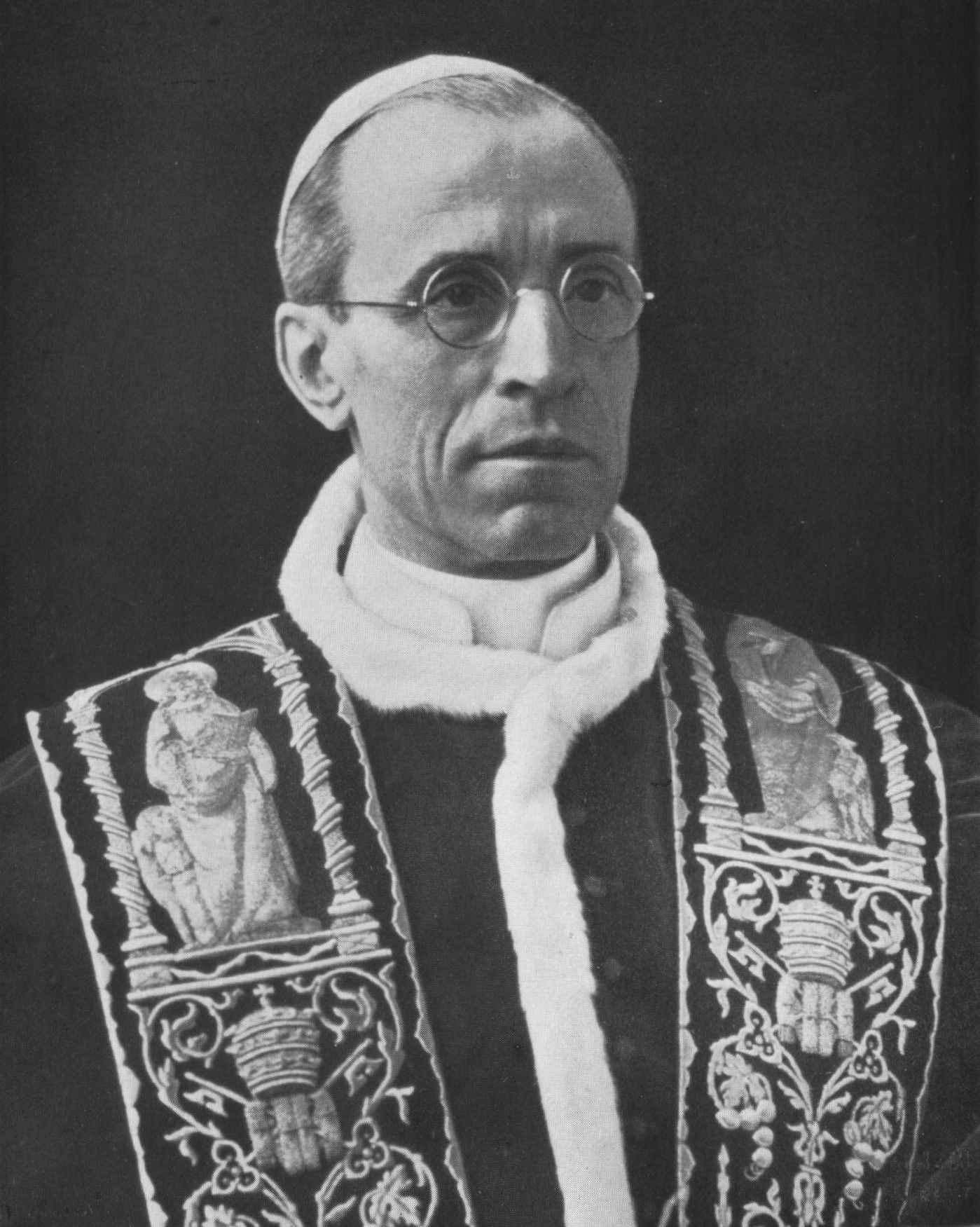
Pope Pius XII

The encyclical builds on a theological development in the 1920s and 1930s in Italy, France, Germany and England, which all re-discovered the Pauline concept of the Mystical Body of Christ. In 1936, Emile Mersch had warned of some false mysticisms being advanced with regard to the mystical body, and his history of this topic was seen as influencing the encyclical.

On 18 January 1943, five months before the promulgation of Mystici Corporis Christi, Archbishop Conrad Gröber of Fribourg promulgated a letter in which he addressed the docetic tendencies of some mystical body theology (tendencies to separate the spiritual and the material elements in man). Timothy Gabrielli saw Pius' emphasis on the church as a perfect society on earth as an attempt to save the mystical body theology, with its many theological, pastoral, and spiritual benefits, from the danger of docetism.

== Content ==
=== Role of the laity ===
The encyclical teaches that both laypeople and the leadership have a role to play in the Catholic Church. Lay people are at the forefront of the Church, and have to be aware of 'being the Church', not just 'belonging to the Church'. At the same time, the Pope and bishops are responsible for providing leadership for all the faithful. Together, they are the Church and work for the good of the Church.

=== Apostles and bishops ===
The encyclical states that Christ, while still on earth, instructed by precept, counsel and warnings "in words that shall never pass away, and will be spirit and life" to all men of all times. He conferred a triple power on his Apostles and their successors, to teach, to govern, to lead men to holiness, making this power, defined by special ordinances, rights and obligations, the fundamental law of the whole Church. God governs directly and guides personally the Church which He founded. Pius XII quoted Proverbs 21:1, noting that God reigns within the minds and hearts of men, and bends and subjects their wills to His good pleasure, even when rebellious.

Mystici Corporis requests the faithful to love their Church and to always see Christ in her, especially in the old and sick members. They must accustom themselves "to see Christ Himself in the Church. For it is Christ who lives in His Church, and through her, teaches, governs, and sanctifies; it is Christ also who manifests Himself differently in different members of His society".

=== Opposition to Nazism ===
Pius XII wrote: "The Church of God ... is despised and hated maliciously by those who shut their eyes to the light of Christian wisdom and miserably return to the teachings, customs and practices of ancient paganism". He quoted the book of Wisdom to the effect that "a most severe judgment shall be for them that bear rule. ... The mighty shall be mightily tormented ... A greater punishment is ready for the more mighty".

Ronald Rychlak has described the encyclical as "an obvious attack on the theoretical basis of National Socialism".

==== Killing of disabled people ====
Pius' statement of "profound grief" at the death of "the deformed, the insane, and those suffering from hereditary disease ... as though they were a useless burden to Society" was a condemnation of the ongoing Nazi euthanasia program, under which disabled Germans were being removed from care facilities and murdered by the state as "life unworthy of life".

=== Exclusion on the basis of race or nationality ===
Pius XII appealed to "Catholics the world over" to "look to the Vicar of Jesus Christ as the loving Father of them all, who ... takes upon himself with all his strength the defense of truth, justice and charity". He explained: "Our paternal love embraces all peoples, whatever their nationality or race". Christ, by his blood, made the Jews and Gentiles one "breaking down the middle wall of partition ... in his flesh by which the two peoples were divided". He noted that Jews were among the first people to adore Jesus. Pius then made an appeal for all to "follow our peaceful King [Jesus Christ] who taught us to love not only those who are of a different nation or race, but even our enemies".

=== Forced conversions ===
Mystici Corporis Christi strongly condemned the forced conversions to Catholicism that were then occurring in Fascist Croatia. Church membership and conversions must be voluntary. Regarding conversions, it states: "We recognize that this must be done of their own free will; for no one believes unless he wills to believe. Hence they are most certainly not genuine Christians who against their belief are forced to go into a church, to approach the altar and to receive the Sacraments; for the 'faith without which it is impossible to please God' is an entirely free 'submission of intellect and will.'"

=== Ecclesiology ===
Ecclesiology is one of the focus of the encyclical.

The encyclical defines the "true Church of Jesus Christ" and the "Mystical Body of Christ" as "the One, Holy, Catholic, Apostolic and Roman Church".

It states that the only ones who can be considered as "members of the Church" are those "who have been baptized and profess the true faith, and who have not ... separate[d] themselves from the unity of the Body, or been excluded by legitimate authority for grave faults committed". The encyclical also states that the sins of heresy and schism, by their "own nature", "sever a man from the Body of the Church".

As for "those who do not belong to the visible Body of the Catholic Church, ... even though by an unconscious desire and longing they have a certain relationship with the Mystical Body of the Redeemer, they still remain deprived of those many heavenly gifts and helps which can only be enjoyed in the Catholic Church".

The encyclical rejects two views on the Church:

1. A rationalistic or purely sociological understanding of the Church, according to which the Church is merely a human organization with structures and activities. The encyclical states that the visible Church and its structures do exist but the Church is more, she is guided by the Holy Spirit: "Although the juridical principles, on which the Church rests and is established, derive from the divine constitution given to it by Christ and contribute to the attaining of its supernatural end, nevertheless that which lifts the Society of Christians far above the whole natural order is the Spirit of our Redeemer who penetrates and fills every part of the Church".
2. An exclusively mystical understanding of the Church is mistaken as well, because a mystical 'Christ in us' union would deify its members and mean that the acts of Christians are simultaneously the acts of Christ. The theological concept una mystica persona ("one mystical person") refers not to an individual relation but to the unity of Christ with the Church and the unity of its members with him in the Church.

=== Mariology ===
The encyclical concludes with a summary of the mariology of the Pope. The 1854 dogma of the Immaculate Conception by Pius IX defined that the Virgin Mary was conceived without sin, as the mother of God and of all humans. Pope Pius XII built on this in Mystici Corporis: Mary, "whose sinless soul was filled with the divine spirit of Jesus Christ above all other created souls, who 'in the name of the whole human race' gave her consent 'for a spiritual marriage between the Son of God and human nature'". It adds: "she who, according to the flesh, was the mother of our Head [Jesus Christ], through the added title of pain and glory became, according to the Spirit, the mother of all His members. It was through her powerful prayers obtained that the spirit of our Divine Redeemer, already given on the Cross, should be bestowed, accompanied by miraculous gifts, on the newly founded Church at Pentecost; and finally, bearing with courage and confidence the tremendous burden of her sorrows and desolation, she, truly the Queen of Martyrs".

While the Early Church Fathers tended to contrast Eve's disobedience with Mary's acceptance at the Annunciation, Pius looked rather to her presence at Calvary where "she, the second Eve, who, free from all sin, original or personal, and always more intimately united with her Son, offered Him on Golgotha to the Eternal Father for all the children of Adam, sin-stained by his unhappy fall". Pius viewed her compassion there as the basis for her role in humanity's redemption.

If the Mother of God was born as the "second Eve", the Church was born as the "new Eve". Pius XII repeated that, according to "unanimous teaching" of the Church Fathers and the magisterium of Christ, the "Church was born from the side of our Savior on the Cross like a new Eve, mother of all the living".

== Legacy ==
Mystici Corporis did not receive much attention during the war years but became influential after World War II.

=== Racial relationships ===
In the United States, the encyclical's comments on racial relationships were seen as a critique of any kind of prejudice against African Americans.

=== Nazi Germany ===
The encyclical was followed, on 26 September 1943, by an open condemnation in Nazi Germany by the German Bishops which, from every pulpit of every German churches, denounced the killing of "innocent and defenceless mentally handicapped, incurably infirm and fatally wounded, innocent hostages, and disarmed prisoners of war and criminal offenders, people of a foreign race or descent".

=== Ecclesiology ===
Mystici Corporis Christi is principally remembered for its statement that the Mystical Body of Christ is identical with the Roman Catholic Church, a position later reaffirmed by Pius XII in Humani generis (1950) in response to dissension. (Note: 27. Some say they are not bound by the doctrine, explained in Our Encyclical Letter of a few years ago [Mystici Corporis Christi], and based on the Sources of Revelation, which teaches that the Mystical Body of Christ and the Roman Catholic Church are one and the same thing. Some reduce to a meaningless formula the necessity of belonging to the true Church in order to gain eternal salvation. Others finally belittle the reasonable character of the credibility of Christian faith.; 28. These and like errors, it is clear, have crept in among certain of Our sons who are deceived by imprudent zeal for souls or by false science. To them We are compelled with grief to repeat once again truths already well known, and to point out with solicitude clear errors and dangers of error.)

In 1947, Pius XII wrote the encyclical Mediator Dei which acknowledged that baptized Christians were members of the Mystical Body and participated in Christ's priestly office.

During the Second Vatican Council, Yves Congar argued that the term ecclesia ('church') concerned the people "called forth", the People of God, those over whom God reigns. "Body of Christ", then, would emphasize the special union with the risen Christ that came with the new covenant. Congar was later denounced by the Holy Office for describing the Church as essentially a community in the Spirit, a gathering of the faithful.

The Second Vatican Council would later define in Lumen gentium that the Church subsists in (in Latin: subsistit in) the Catholic Church.

Paul VI's 1964 encyclical letter Ecclesiam Suam quotes Mystici Corporis Christi:

Consider, then, this splendid utterance of Our predecessor:
"The doctrine of the Mystical Body of Christ, which is the Church, a doctrine revealed originally from the lips of the Redeemer Himself, and making manifest the inestimable boon of our most intimate union with so august a Head, has a surpassing splendor which commends it to the meditation of all who are moved by the divine Spirit, and with the light which it sheds on their minds, is a powerful stimulus to the salutary conduct which it enjoins."

=== Laity ===
In 1947, Pius XII issued the apostolic constitution Provida Mater Ecclesia, which allowed lay people to form their own secular communities, and establish them within a newly established canon law framework.

== See also ==
- List of encyclicals of Pope Pius XII
- Communitas perfecta
- Church invisible
- Ecclesiam Suam
