= Mediator Dei =

1947 papal encyclical

Mediator Dei Latin for 'Mediator [between] God' Encyclical of Pope Pius XII
- Signature date: 20 November 1947
- Number: 12 of the pontificate
- Text: In Latin; In English

Mediator Dei (English: Mediator [between] God) is an encyclical issued by Pope Pius XII on 20 November 1947. It was the first encyclical devoted entirely to liturgy.

The encyclical suggested new directions and active participation instead of a merely passive role for the faithful in the liturgy, in liturgical ceremonies and in the life of their parish. The encyclical also emphasized the importance of the Eucharist. Mediator Dei is one of the more important encyclicals of Pope Pius XII. The encyclical condemned certain excesses of liturgical reform and stressed the importance of the union of sacrifice and altar with communion, which would also be seen in the reforms undertaken during and after Vatican II. It was written in part in response to the Liturgical Movement, then underway since the early 20th century.

== Introduction ==
Pope Pius defends liturgy as important, sacred and sacramental. Liturgy is more than the sum of liturgical actions and prescriptions. It is an error to think of the sacred liturgy as merely the outward or visible part of divine worship or as an ornamental ceremonial. No less erroneous is the notion that it consists solely in a list of laws and prescriptions according to which the ecclesiastical hierarchy orders the sacred rites to be performed.

The encyclical was written in part to reject the idea that "objective piety" (i.e. merely participating in liturgy and partaking of sacraments) made "subjective piety" (i.e. one's disposition) unnecessary, or that non-liturgical piety could be held in contempt.

The encyclical has four parts.

== Nature of liturgy ==
The first part explains the nature, origin and development of liturgy. Liturgy is public worship, an obligation for individuals and communities. Liturgy is outward adoration of God as well as a fountain for personal piety. It originated with the early Church.

The first Christians "were preserving the doctrine of the apostles and in communication by the breaking of bread and their prayers." Whenever their pastors could summon a little group of the faithful together, they set up an altar on which they proceeded to offer the sacrifice, and around which were ranged all other rites appropriate for the saving of souls and for the honor due to God.

"The worship rendered by the Church to God must be, in its entirety, interior as well as exterior. [...] Exterior worship [...] reveals and emphasizes the unity of the mystical Body, feeds new fuel to its holy zeal, fortifies its energy, intensifies its action day by day: 'for although the ceremonies themselves can claim no perfection or sanctity in their own right, they are, nevertheless, the outward acts of religion, designed to rouse the heart, like signals of a sort, to veneration of the sacred realities, and to raise the mind to meditation on the supernatural. They serve to foster piety, to kindle the flame of charity, to increase our faith and deepen our devotion. They provide instruction for simple folk, decoration for divine worship, continuity of religious practice. They make it possible to tell genuine Christians from their false or heretical counterparts.' But the chief element of divine worship must be interior. For we must always live in Christ and give ourselves to Him completely, so that in Him, with Him and through Him the heavenly Father may be duly glorified."

Through prayer, the members of the Mystical Body of Christ are harmonized and united. The liturgy is regulated by the clergy and hierarchy of the church.

"The entire liturgy [...] has the Catholic faith for its content, inasmuch as it bears public witness to the faith of the Church."

== Authority of the pope ==
On the authority of the pope over the liturgy, Pius XII wrote: "the Sovereign Pontiff alone enjoys the right to recognize and establish any practice touching the worship of God, to introduce and approve new rites, as also to modify those he judges to require modification. Bishops, for their part, have the right and duty carefully to watch over the exact observance of the prescriptions of the sacred canons respecting divine worship. Private individuals, therefore, even though they be clerics, may not be left to decide for themselves in these holy and venerable matters" He adds that "no private person has any authority to regulate external practices of this kind".

"The Church is without question a living organism, and as an organism, in respect of the sacred liturgy also, she grows, matures, develops, adapts and accommodates herself to temporal needs and circumstances, provided only that the integrity of her doctrine be safeguarded. This notwithstanding, the temerity and daring of those who introduce novel liturgical practices, or call for the revival of obsolete rites out of harmony with prevailing laws and rubrics, deserve severe reproof."

The liturgy has divine and human elements. Its human elements result from the teachings of the church, church laws, pious usages by the faithful and the development of art and music. Pius warns strongly against a sense of "liturgical archaeologism", the belief that the most ancient practices are more venerable. He recognizes that liturgy is organic, and to return to the most ancient practices would ignore centuries of liturgical organic development. He goes on to say that: "[One] would be straying from the straight path were he to wish the altar restored to its primitive table form; were he to want black excluded as a color for liturgical vestments; were he to forbid the use of sacred images and statues in Church; were he to order the crucifix so designed that the Divine Redeemer's Body shows no trace of his cruel sufferings."

== Eucharistic cult ==
The Eucharist is a renewal of the sacrifice on the cross. Christ is the priest, the sacrifice and the purpose of the Eucharistic sacrifice. The faithful should participate but they do not have priestly authority. They participate in the sacrifice together with the priest. They participate by cleansing their souls of arrogance, anger, guilt, lust and other sins, and thus see more clearly the picture of Christ in themselves.

The encyclical teaches that the congregations' singing of hymns or answering the priest "in an orderly and fitting manner" is approved and recommended, but "are by no means necessary to constitute it [the sacrifice] a public act or to give it a social character."

Mediator Dei advises bishops to create offices to encourage active participation and dignified services, and to ensure that individual priests do not use the Eucharist as experiments for their own purposes. The encyclical encourages the faithful to participate in Holy Communion and uses the terms spiritual and sacramental communion. Communion must be followed by a thanksgiving.

The encyclical encourages the adoration of the Blessed Sacrament and Eucharistic Blessings. The historical Jesus and the Eucharist cannot be separated. The full liturgy opens to the faithful the mystery of the cross in the likeness of their Redeemer.

"All the elements of the liturgy, then, would have us reproduce in our hearts the likeness of the divine Redeemer through the mystery of the cross, according to the words of the Apostle of the Gentiles, 'With Christ I am nailed to the cross. I live, now not I, but Christ live in me.' Gal. 2:19-20. Thus we become a victim, as it were, along with Christ to increase the glory of the eternal Father."

"Assuredly it is a wise and most laudable thing to return in spirit and affection to the sources of the sacred liturgy. For research in this field of study, by tracing it back to its origins, contributes valuable assistance towards a more thorough and careful investigation of the significance of feast-days, and of the meaning of the texts and sacred ceremonies employed on their occasion."

Pius XII wrote that exaggerated reforms have harmful effects on spirituality: "This way of acting bids fair to revive the exaggerated and senseless antiquarianism to which the illegal Council of Pistoia gave rise. It likewise attempts to reinstate a series of errors which were responsible for the calling of that meeting as well as for those resulting from it, with grievous harm to souls, and which the Church, the ever watchful guardian of the 'deposit of faith' committed to her charge by her divine Founder, had every right and reason to condemn.[53] For perverse designs and ventures of this sort tend to paralyze and weaken that process of sanctification by which the sacred liturgy directs the sons of adoption to their Heavenly Father of their souls' salvation".

== Liturgy of the Hours ==
The Liturgy of the Hours (Divine Office) is a never-ending prayer of the Church, requiring a spirit of contemplation. The faithful are encouraged to participate in the Liturgy of the Hours especially on Sundays. Thus they participate in the life of Christ, which the church repeats and explains on a yearly basis.

The saints are ideals and models and intercessors. Among the inhabitants of heaven, Mary has a special place. She is like no other involved in the mysteries of Christ. She offers her son and provides all help needed.

== Liturgy and the arts ==
Mediator Dei discusses the need to have tasteful and beautiful houses of worship. Not necessarily rich in historical artifacts, but clean and not overburdened with kitsch. While Pius XII was critical of those who stripped their churches of virtually all ancient art, including pictures and statuary, he disapproved of churches and altars overloaded with art-like trinkets and works.

"Nevertheless, in keeping with the duty of Our office, We cannot help deploring and condemning those works of art, recently introduced by some, which seem to be a distortion and perversion of true art and which at times openly shock Christian taste, modesty and devotion, and shamefully offend the true religious sense. These must be entirely excluded and banished from our churches, like 'anything else that is not in keeping with the sanctity of the place.'"

== Reception ==
Progressive theological advocates of modernism, many of whom were subsequently censured and silenced after Pius XII's promulgation of Humani generis in 1950, especially in France, (Henri de Lubac, Yves Congar) presented a highly colored interpretation of the encyclical. Nouvelle Revue Théologique labelled Mediator Dei "the most important teaching, which the Magisterium ever issued, and one of greatest documents of this pontificate".

The Jesuit G.M. Hansens wrote in the influential Civiltà Cattolica "that the importance of the encyclical are obviously the reforms, but also the notion, that without liturgy, religious life is not possible, and, liturgy as Pius XII taught, is 'more than a beautiful spectacle but ultimate adoration of God Himself'". An unsigned editorial in the journal Life of the Spirit suggested that some eccentric German liturgical reformists went too far "and are now told to look at the depths of the dogma". A Blackfriers commentary also pointed to liturgical developments in Germany, which are now largely legal.

An American journal, Orate Fratres, issued by Saint John's Abbey in Minnesota, wrote that with this encyclical of Pope Pius XII, "liturgy ceases to be an unimportant composite of ceremonies and regulations. It is now accepted dogma that liturgy is not static but actively changing lives. It is hoped that the encyclical will help to coordinate the liturgical renewal throughout the Catholic world and thus multiply its effects on Christian life everywhere, similarly to the reform movement of Cluny or the reforms of the Council of Trent."

== See also ==
- Sacrosanctum concilium, 4 December 1963
- Musicae Sacrae
- Lex orandi, lex credendi
