= Medieval Exegesis =

1959-64 study by Henri de Lubac

Medieval Exegesis: The Four Senses of Scripture, is a four-volume study by Henri de Lubac, first published in French (Exégèse médiévale) between 1959 and 1964. Exégèse médiévale illustrates de Lubac's own approach to ressourcement, or, "return to the sources." Scholars consider it to be one of the most important and thorough studies of the history of medieval exegesis, although it has been subject to significant criticism. It continues the theme started in History and Spirit (Histoire et Esprit: L'Intelligence de l'Ecriture d'après Origène), de Lubac's work on Origen of Alexandria's exegesis published in 1950. The subject matter of Exégèse médiévale similarly ranges from the early Christian patristics to the later Middle Ages and its primary subject matter, as its subtitle suggests, is the development of the four-fold method of scriptural interpretation, i.e., historia, allegory, tropology, and anagogy.

The first three volumes have been translated into English and published by Eerdmans:

- Vol. 1, 489 pgs. (1998) Translated by Mark Sebanc ISBN 0-8028-4145-7
- Vol. 2, 453 pgs. (2000) Translated by E. M. Macierowski ISBN 0-8028-4146-5
- Vol. 3, 800 pgs. (2009) Translated by E. M. Macierowski ISBN 0-8028-4147-3
