= Ecclesiam Suam =

1964 papal encyclical by Paul VI

Ecclesiam Suam Latin for 'His Church' Encyclical of Pope Paul VI
- Signature date: 6 August 1964
- Subject: The mandate of the Catholic Church in the modern world
- Number: 1 of 7 of the pontificate
- Text: In Latin; In English

Ecclesiam Suam is an encyclical letter of Pope Paul VI on the Catholic Church given at St. Peter's, Rome, on the Feast of the Transfiguration, 6 August 1964, the second year of his Pontificate.

In the opening words of the letter, Pope Paul refers to the Church founded by Jesus Christ as "a loving mother of all men". He states that in light of the ongoing Vatican Council he did not want to offer new insights or doctrinal definitions. He asks for a deeper self-knowledge, renewal and dialogue. He also states that the Church itself was engulfed and shaken by a tidal wave of change, and was deeply affected by the climate of the world.

Sean O'Riordan, in The Furrow, noted that the encyclical was issued between the second and third sessions of the Council "to guide the thoughts and aspirations of men, and of his brother bishops in particular, towards the exigencies of the conclusive moment of the Church's history" which was then upon them.

== Contents ==
=== Aims ===
The letter is addressed not only to Catholic bishops, but to "the faithful of the entire world, and to all men of good will". Paul sets out the following aim:

To demonstrate with increasing clarity how vital it is for the world, and how greatly desired by the Catholic Church, that the two should meet together, and get to know and love one another.

Three sections follow, dealing in turn with the church's self-awareness, its renewal, and the development of a dialogue with the contemporary world.

=== The Mystical Body of Christ ===
Paul quotes the encyclical Mystici Corporis of Pope Pius XII, as a key document:

Consider, then, this splendid utterance of Our predecessor:

"The doctrine of the Mystical Body of Christ, which is the Church, a doctrine revealed originally from the lips of the Redeemer Himself, and making manifest the inestimable boon of our most intimate union with so august a Head, has a surpassing splendor which commends it to the meditation of all who are moved by the divine Spirit, and with the light which it sheds on their minds, is a powerful stimulus to the salutary conduct which it enjoins."

In Ecclesiam suam, he invites separated Churches to unity, stating that the continued papacy is essential for any unity, because without it, in the words of Jerome: "There would be as many schisms in the Church as there are priests."

The Pope also attempts to present the Marian teachings of the Church in view of her new ecumenical orientation. Ecclesiam suam calls the Virgin Mary the ideal of Christian perfection, regarding "devotion to the Mother of God as of paramount importance in living the life of the Gospel".
