= Henri de Lubac =

French Jesuit theologian and cardinal (1896–1991)

His Eminence Henri de Lubac SJ
- Cardinal-Deacon of Santa Maria in Domnica
- Church: Latin Church
- Appointed: 2 February 1983
- Term ended: 4 September 1991
- Predecessor: Alfredo Ottaviani
- Successor: Luigi Poggi

Orders
- Ordination: 22 August 1927
- Created cardinal: 2 February 1983 by Pope John Paul II
- Rank: Cardinal-Deacon

Personal details
- Born: Henri-Marie Joseph Sonier de Lubac; 20 February 1896 Cambrai, France
- Died: 4 September 1991 (aged 95) Paris, France
- Denomination: Roman Catholic
- Occupation: Jesuit priest/theologian
- Coat of arms: Henri de Lubac's coat of arms

Henri-Marie Joseph Sonier de Lubac SJ (French: [lybak]; 20 February 1896 – 4 September 1991), better known as Henri de Lubac, was a French Jesuit priest and cardinal who is considered one of the most influential theologians of the 20th century. His writings and doctrinal research played a key role in shaping the Second Vatican Council.

== Early life and ordination ==
Henri de Lubac was born in Cambrai to an ancient noble family of the Ardèche. He was one of six children; his father was a banker and his mother a homemaker. The family returned in 1898 to the Lyon district, where Henri was schooled by Jesuits. A born aristocrat in manner and appearance, de Lubac studied law for a year before, aged 17, joining the Society of Jesus in Lyon on 9 October 1913. Owing to the political climate in France at the time as a result of the French anti-church laws of the early twentieth century, the Jesuit novitiate had temporarily relocated to St Leonards-on-Sea, East Sussex, where de Lubac studied before being drafted to the French army in 1914 due to the outbreak of the Great War. He received a head wound at Les Éparges on All Saints Day, 1917, (Note: Kerr 2007 describes this as taking place at Les Éparges in 1916; Mettepenningen 2010, p. 96, describes it as taking place on All Saints Day 1917, though does not state where.) which would give him recurring episodes of dizziness and headaches for the rest of his life. Following demobilisation in 1919, de Lubac returned to the Jesuits and continued his philosophical studies, first at Hales Place in Canterbury and then, from 1920 to 1923, at the Maison Saint-Louis, the Jesuit philosophate located at that time in St. Helier, Jersey. It was here that he would encounter the thought of Maurice Blondel and Pierre Rousselot. The encounter with Blondel would prove especially important. In 1932, de Lubac would eventually write to Blondel and tell him of his encounter with L'Action in the early 1920s, and how Blondel's thought around the problem of integralism became one of the central instigators of de Lubac's search for a renewed understanding of the relationship between nature and grace. De Lubac taught at the Jesuit College at Mongré, in the Rhône, from 1923 to 1924, and then in 1924 returned to England and began his four years of theological studies at Ore Place in Hastings, East Sussex. In 1926, the Jesuit college was relocated back to Fourvière in Lyons, where de Lubac completed the remaining two years of his theological studies. He was ordained to the priesthood on 22 August 1927.

== Professor and theologian ==
Styles of Henri de Lubac
- Reference style: His Eminence
- Spoken style: Your Eminence
- Informal style: Cardinal

In 1929, de Lubac was appointed professor of fundamental theology at the Catholic University of Lyon (the required doctorate having been conferred by the Gregorian University in Rome at the behest of the Father General of the Society of Jesus, without de Lubac's setting foot there or ever submitting a dissertation). He would teach there from 1929 to 1961, though with two interruptions – first during World War II, when he was forced underground because of his activities with the French Resistance, and then from 1950 to 1958, when the Society of Jesus, under pressure from Rome, removed him from his teaching responsibilities and the Fourvière Jesuit residence.

During the 1930s de Lubac spent his time teaching at the Catholic University and researching, as well as teaching (between 1935 and 1940) one course at the Jesuit seminary at Fourvière (where he also lived from 1934 onwards). His first book, the now-classic Catholicisme (English title of the current edition: Catholicism: Christ and Common Destiny of Man) was published in 1938, before the war. In 1940, (Note: Most sources, such as Grumett 2007, state 1940; however, some others state 1942.) he founded the series Sources Chrétiennes ("Christian Sources"), co-edited with fellow Jesuit Jean Daniélou, a collection of bilingual, critical editions of early Christian texts and of the Church Fathers that has reinvigorated both the study of patristics and the doctrine of Sacred Tradition.

During the Second World War, the first interruption to this pattern came: de Lubac joined a movement of "spiritual resistance," assisting in the publication of an underground journal of Nazi resistance called Témoignage chrétien, or Christian Testimony. It was intended to show the incompatibility of Christian belief with the philosophy and activities of the Nazi regime, both in Germany and also under the cover of the Vichy government in southern France, which was theoretically independent of the Reich. De Lubac was often in hiding from the Germans and several of his co-workers on the journal were captured and executed. Even in hiding, he continued to study and write.

From 1944 onwards, with the end of the Nazi occupation of France, de Lubac came out of hiding and published a number of texts (many of them begun or completed before the war but not published in the early 1940s because of the shortage of paper) which became major interventions in twentieth-century Catholic theology. These included: Corpus Mysticum, which had been ready for publication in 1939, and appeared in February 1944; Le Drame de l'humanisme athée, (The Drama of Atheist Humanism) published in December 1944; De la connaissance de Dieu published in 1945; Surnaturel: Études historiques (a book which de Lubac had started at Hastings in his student days), published in 1946 in a print run of 700 copies, because of the ongoing paper shortage.

== "Dark years" ==
In June 1950, as de Lubac himself said, "lightning struck Fourvière". De Lubac, who resided at Fourvière but actually did no teaching there, and four Fourvière professors were removed from their duties (in de Lubac's case these included his professorship at Lyon and his editorship of Recherches de science religieuse) and required to leave the Lyon province. All Jesuit provincials were directed to remove three of his books (Surnaturel, Corpus mysticum, and Connaissance de Dieu) and one article from their libraries and, as far as possible, from public distribution. The action came through the Jesuit Superior General, Jean-Baptiste Janssens, under pressure from the curial office, and was because of "pernicious errors on essential points of dogma". Two months later, (Note: This is correct, as opposed to some accounts which place Humani generis first (such as Kerr 2007, p. 74).) Pope Pius XII issued the encyclical Humani generis, widely believed to have been directed at de Lubac and other theologians associated with the nouvelle théologie, an intellectual movement characterized by renewed attention to the patristic sources of Catholicism, a willingness to address the ideas and concerns of contemporary men and women, a focus on pastoral work and respect for the competencies of the laity, and a sense of the Catholic Church as existing in history and affected by it.

What de Lubac called the "dark years" lasted nearly a decade. It was not until 1956 that he was allowed to return to Lyon and not until 1958 that the university got verbal approval from Rome for de Lubac to return to teaching the courses he previously taught.

Although everything de Lubac wrote during these years was subject to censorship in Rome, he never ceased to study, write, and publish. During these years he brought out a study of Origen's biblical exegesis (1950), three books on Buddhism (1951, 1952, 1955), Méditations sur l'Église (1953 – a text which would have great influence on Lumen Gentium, the document produced at Vatican II on the nature of the church), and Sur les chemins de Dieu (1956).

== Return to acceptance ==
His pioneering study Exégèse médiévale (1959–1965) revived interest in the spiritual exegesis of scripture and provided a major impetus to the development of covenantal theology.

Just before and during the conciliar years, with the blessing of his order, de Lubac also began to write and publish books and articles in defense of the writings of Pierre Teilhard de Chardin, his older friend and fellow Jesuit, who had died in 1955. Teilhard's ideas had influenced several of the theologians of the nouvelle théologie and had also met with extreme disfavour in Rome.

== Second Vatican Council ==
In August 1960, Pope John XXIII appointed de Lubac as a consultant to the Preparatory Theological Commission for the upcoming Second Vatican Council. He was then made a peritus (theological expert) to the council itself, and later, by Pope Paul VI, a member of its Theological Commission (as well as of two secretariats). Although the precise nature of his contribution during the council is difficult to determine, his writings were certainly an influence on the conciliar and post-conciliar periods, particularly in the area of ecclesiology where one of his concerns was to understand the church as the community of the whole people of God rather than just the clergy. De Lubac's influence on Lumen gentium (Dogmatic Constitution on the Church) and Gaudium et spes (Constitution on the Church in the Modern World) is generally recognized.

== Late years ==
In 1969 Pope Paul VI, an admirer of de Lubac's works, had proposed making him a cardinal but de Lubac demurred, believing that for him to become a bishop, as required of all cardinals, would be "an abuse of an apostolic office". (Note: Pope John XXIII had established the rule that all cardinals be bishops in 1962.) Paul VI, having committed to creating a Jesuit cardinal, conferred the honor on de Lubac's junior colleague Jean Daniélou instead.

In the years after Vatican II, de Lubac came to be known as a "conservative theologian", his views completely in line with the magisterium – in contrast to his progressive reputation in the first part of his life. Contributing to this reputation, in 1972 de Lubac, alongside Joseph Ratzinger who later became Pope Benedict XVI, and Hans Urs von Balthasar, founded the journal Communio − a journal which acquired a reputation as offering a more conservative theology than Concilium.

In 1983 Pope John Paul II offered to make de Lubac a cardinal, this time with a dispensation from being consecrated a bishop. De Lubac accepted and became the first non-bishop cardinal since the 1962 rule requiring cardinals to be bishops. In the consistory of 2 February 1983, Pope John Paul II raised de Lubac, at 87, to the College of Cardinals. He was created Cardinal Deacon of Santa Maria in Domnica. On 24 May 1990, de Lubac became the oldest living cardinal. He died in Paris in 1991.

== Possible canonization ==
On 31 March 2023 the Bishops' Conference of France voted to open the cause for canonization for de Lubac due to his influence on Catholic theology and philosophy. If the Vatican agrees, he will firstly be given the title of "Servant of God".

== Selected bibliography ==
- Publication of de Lubac's Oeuvres completes (50 vols; Paris: Cerf, 1998).
- Catholicisme: Les aspects sociaux du dogme (Paris, 1938: seven editions were published, the last in 1983), translated as Catholicism, trans. Sheppard, L. & Englund, E, (London: Longman Green, 1950), and later reissued as Catholicism: Christ and the Common Destiny of Man, (San Francisco: Ignatius Press, 1988).
- Corpus Mysticum: Essai sur L'Eucharistie et l’Église au moyen âge (Paris, 1944), translated as Corpus Mysticum: The Eucharist and the Church in the Middle Ages, trans Gemma Simmonds with Richard Price and Christopher Stephens, (London, 2006).
- Le drame de l'humanisme athée (Paris, 1944), translated as The Drama of Atheist Humanism, trans. Riley, M., Nash, A. & Sebanc, M., (San Francisco: Ignatius Press, 1995 − translation of the 1983 edition including chapters omitted from the 1949 translation).
- De la Connaissance de Dieu (Paris, 1945). A greatly expanded version of this book later appeared under the title Sur les chemins de Dieu, (Paris, 1956); this later work was translated as The Discovery of God, translated by Alexander Dru with Mark Sebanc and Cassian Fulsom, (Grand Rapids, MI: Eerdmans, 1996).
- Surnaturel: Études historiques (1946). A new French edition issued by (Paris: Desclée de Brouwer, 1991) contains a complete translation into French of all Greek and Latin citations. There is not yet (2024) an English translation. However, Augustinianism and Modern Theology (1967) closely follows Part One of Surnaturel, and the conclusion is translated by David Coffey in Philosophy and Theology, 11:2, (1999), 368–80.
- Histoire et esprit: l'intelligence de l'Écriture d'apres Origene (Paris, 1950), translated as History and Spirit: The Understanding of Scripture According to Origen, trans. Anne Englund Nash with Juvenal Merriell, (San Francisco: Ignatius Press, 2007).
- Aspects du bouddhisme (Paris, 1951), translated as Aspects of Buddhism, trans George Lamb, (London: Sheed and Ward, 1953).
- Rencontre du bouddhisme et de l'occident (Paris, 1952).
- Méditation sur l'Église (Paris, 1953), translated as The Splendor of the Church, trans Michael Mason, (London: Sheed & Ward, 1956), and later reissued by (San Francisco: Ignatius Press, 1986).
- Aspects du bouddhisme, vol. 2: Amida, (Paris: Seuil, 1955), translated as History of Pure Land Buddhism, trans. Amita Bhaka, Buddha Dhyana Dana Review, 12: 5-6 (2002); 13: 1, (2003).
- Exégèse médiévale 4 vols, (Paris, 1959, 1961, 1964), translated as Medieval Exegesis, trans. Mark Sebanc (vol i), Edward M Macierowski (vols ii and iii), 4 vols, (Grand Rapids, MI: Eerdmans, 1998-).
- Teilhard de Chardin: The Man and His Meaning, trans. Rene Hague (New York: Hawthorn Books, 1965).
- Augustisme et théologie moderne (Paris, 1965), translated as Augustinianism and Modern Theology, (London: G Chapman; New York: Herder & Herder, 1969), and reissued as (New York: Crossroad, 2000).
- Le Mystere du surnaturel (1965), translated as The Mystery of the Supernatural, trans. Rosemary Sheed (London: G Chapman, 1967), 2nd edition New York: Crossroad Publishing Company, 1998.
- The Religions of Teilhard de Chardin, trans. Rene Hague (New York: Desclee Co., 1967).
- Teilhard Explained, trans. Anthony Buono (New York: Paulist Press, 1968).
- The Eternal Feminine: A Study on the Poem by Teilhard de Chardin, trans. René Hague (New York: Harper & Row, 1971).
- Petite catéchese sur nature et grace (Paris, 1980), translated as A Brief Catechesis on Nature and Grace by Richard Arnauder, FSC (San Francisco: Ignatius Press. 1984).
- Trois jésuites nous parlent: Yves de Montcheuil, 1899–1944, Charles Nicolet, 1897–1961, Jean Zupan, 1899-1968, (Paris, 1980), translated as Three Jesuits speak: Yves de Montcheuil, 1899–1944, Charles Nicolet, 1897–1961, Jean Zupan, 1899–1968. Presented by Henri de Lubac, trans. by K. D. Whitehead (San Francisco: Ignatius Press, 1987).
- The Motherhood of the Church, trans. Sergia Englund (San Francisco: Ignatius Press, 1982).
- Paradoxes of Faith. trans. P. Simon, S. Kreilkamp, & E. Beaumont (San Francisco: Ignatius Press, 1987).
- The Christian Faith: An Essay on the Structure of the Apostles' Creed, trans. Richard Arnandez (San Francisco: Ignatius Press, 1986).
- At the Service of the Church: Henri de Lubac reflects on the circumstances that occasioned his writings, trans. Anne Englund Nash (San Francisco: Ignatius Press, 1993).
- Theology in History, trans. Anne Englund Nash (San Francisco: Ignatius Press, 1996).
- More Paradoxes. trans. A. Nash (San Francisco: Ignatius Press, 2002). A translation of Autres Paradoxes.
- Vatican Council Notebooks, Vol. 1, trans. Andrew Stefanelli and Anne Englund Nash (San Francisco: Ignatius Press, 2015).
- Vatican Council Notebooks, Vol. 2, trans. Anne Englund Nash (San Francisco: Ignatius Press, 2016).

== Notes ==
Records
Preceded by Julijans Vaivods	Oldest living Member of the Sacred College; 24 May 1990 – 4 September 1991	Succeeded by Ferdinando Giuseppe Antonelli
