= Dominus Iesus =

Catholic document

Dominus Iesus (English: The Lord Jesus) is a declaration by the Congregation for the Doctrine of the Faith published on August 6, 2000.

The document was approved in a plenary meeting of the Congregation and signed by its then-prefect, Joseph Cardinal Ratzinger (later Pope Benedict XVI), and its then-secretary, Archbishop Tarcisio Bertone. The declaration was approved by Pope John Paul II and was published on August 6, 2000.

It is known for its elaboration of the Catholic dogma that the Catholic Church is the sole true Church founded by Jesus Christ and insists that Christian revelation is uniquely and definitively true, and that other religions contain deficiencies.

== Background ==
The Catholic dogma extra ecclesiam nulla salus (lit. '"no salvation outside the Church"') has sometimes been interpreted as denying salvation to non-Catholic Christians as well as non-Christians, though Catholic teaching has long stressed the possibility of salvation for persons invincibly ignorant (through no fault of their own) of the Catholic Church's necessity and thus not culpable for lacking communion with the Church.

The Second Vatican Council document Lumen gentium further affirmed that salvation could be available to people who had not even heard of Christ. However, all who gain salvation do so only by membership in the Catholic Church, whether that membership is ordinary (explicit) or by extraordinary means (implicit), such that any person who, despite "knowing that the Catholic Church was made necessary by Christ, would refuse to enter or to remain in it, [cannot] be saved."

== Role of other religious communities ==
While affirming the teaching of Lumen gentium that the Catholic Church "is the single Church of Christ" and that "[t]his Church, constituted and organized as a society in the present world, subsists in the Catholic Church", Dominus Iesus offers further comments on what it means for the true Church to "subsist in" the Catholic Church. The document states that, "[w]ith the expression subsistit in, the Second Vatican Council sought to harmonize two doctrinal statements: on the one hand, that the Church of Christ, despite the divisions which exist among Christians, continues to exist fully only in the Catholic Church, and on the other hand, that 'outside of her structure, many elements can be found of sanctification and truth.'"

=== Non-Catholic Christians ===
The document reserves the word "Church" for bodies that have preserved a "valid episcopate and the genuine and integral substance of the Eucharistic mystery". Such bodies, which include the Eastern Orthodox, Oriental Orthodox and the Old Catholic Churches, "are true particular Churches", and the document affirms that "the Church of Christ is present and operative also in these Churches, even though they lack full communion with the Catholic Church, since they do not accept the Catholic doctrine of Primacy."

The document uses the term "ecclesial community" (from the Greek word ecclesia, meaning "church") rather than "Church" for those Christian bodies not named in the preceding paragraph, most notably including all Protestants. The document states that, although such Christian communities "are not Churches in the proper sense", nevertheless "those who are baptized in these communities are, by Baptism, incorporated in Christ and thus are in a certain communion, albeit imperfect, with the Church." It further states that such Christian communities, "though we believe they suffer from defects, have by no means been deprived of significance and importance in the mystery of salvation. For the spirit of Christ has not refrained from using them as means of salvation."

=== Non-Christian religions ===
The document declares that, although the Catholic Church is intended by God to be "the instrument for the salvation of all humanity," such beliefs do not "lessen the sincere respect which the Church has for the religions of the world." It does, however, "rule out, in a radical way [...] a religious relativism which leads to the belief that 'one religion is as good as another'" which characterizes "indifferentism".

The document goes on to affirm the possibility that those who subscribe to non-Christian religions may eventually be saved while insisting that the means of such salvation must be by Christ through his Church, and not through the religion to which such a person subscribes: "If it is true that the followers of other religions can receive divine grace, it is also certain that objectively speaking they are in a gravely deficient situation in comparison with those who, in the Church, have the fullness of the means of salvation." The document then immediately reminds Christians that their more direct enjoyment of the means of salvation comes "not from their own merits, but from the grace of Christ. If they fail to respond in thought, word, and deed to that grace, not only shall they not be saved, but they shall be more severely judged."

== John Paul II ==
On 1 October 2000, during one of his angelus, Pope John Paul II stated he had approved Dominus Iesus "in a special way". He added: "This confession does not deny salvation to non-Christians, but points to its ultimate source in Christ, in whom man and God are united."

== Reception ==
Dominus Iesus has often been interpreted by academics as a direct condemnation of religious pluralism – though never explicitly named, championed by figures such as John Hick.

== See also ==
- Catholic Church and ecumenism
- Nostra aetate
- Subsistit in
