= Sebastiaan Tromp =

Dutch Jesuit theologian (1889–1975)

The Reverend Sebastiaan Tromp SJ
- Born: 16 March 1889; Beek, Gelderland, Netherlands
- Died: 8 February 1975 (aged 85); Rome, Lazio, Italy
- Notable work: De Romanorum piaculis Corpus Christi quod est Ecclesia
- Theological work
- Tradition or movement: Scholastic theology

Sebastiaan Peter Cornelis Tromp SJ (16 March 1889 – 8 February 1975) was a Dutch Jesuit priest, theologian, and Latinist, who is best known for assisting Pope Pius XII in his theological encyclicals, and Pope John XXIII in the preparation for Vatican II. He was an assistant to Cardinal Alfredo Ottaviani during the Council and professor of Catholic theology at the Pontifical Gregorian University from 1929 until 1967.

== Early life ==
Sebastian Tromp was born in March 1889, the first son of Cornelis Gerardus Tromp (German: Kornelius Gerhard Tromp), a teacher in the Netherlands, and Maria Catherina Lörper. His mother was from an expatriate German family, expelled during the Kulturkampf.

== Ecclesiastical career ==
After his graduation from high school in 1907, Tromp entered the Society of Jesus at Canisius College in Nijmegen. He studied in the novitiate at Mariëndaal, and continued on for a triennium in philosophy at Oudenbosch. An exceptional Latinist, Tromp achieved a doctorate in Classical Languages from the University of Amsterdam in 1921. He received Holy Orders on 8 October 1922 and thus became a Jesuit priest; he completed his theological studies in 1926 at the Pontifical Gregorian University.

Until 1929, Tromp taught as a professor of Latin, Greek, and fundamental theology at the Theologicum of the Jesuit Order in Maastricht, when he was relocated to the Gregorian University as an instructor in the same subject. Tromp quickly attracted attention, and in 1936 he was appointed consultator of the Holy Office. Tromp had already elaborated on the dangers of Nazism by 1937, and translated and referenced the encyclical 1937 Mit brennender Sorge against the errors and dangers of the National Socialist state. He was appointed apostolic visitator, and performed apostolic visitations of professors at Dutch major seminaries and the Catholic University of Nijmegen in 1939, after the end of the Second World War, and in 1955. The purpose of these visits was to expose the teaching of Neo-Modernist theological propositions—especially those directly condemned in the 1907 encyclical Pascendi dominici gregis. He came under some criticism for the zeal with which he carried out these examinations.

In 1951, Tromp was made a member of the Royal Academy of Sciences of Belgium. While progressive theologians despised his doctrinal orthodoxy, he was not a humorless academic, and became a much-loved preacher during annual meetings of the minor seminary at Rolduc. He also had a true pastoral personality, helping several couples obtaining an annulment of their previous marriages in the Vatican, but only after a rigid investigation; even valid annulments were often rejected as impious and sinful in the strict Catholic atmosphere of the Dutch parishes before 1960.

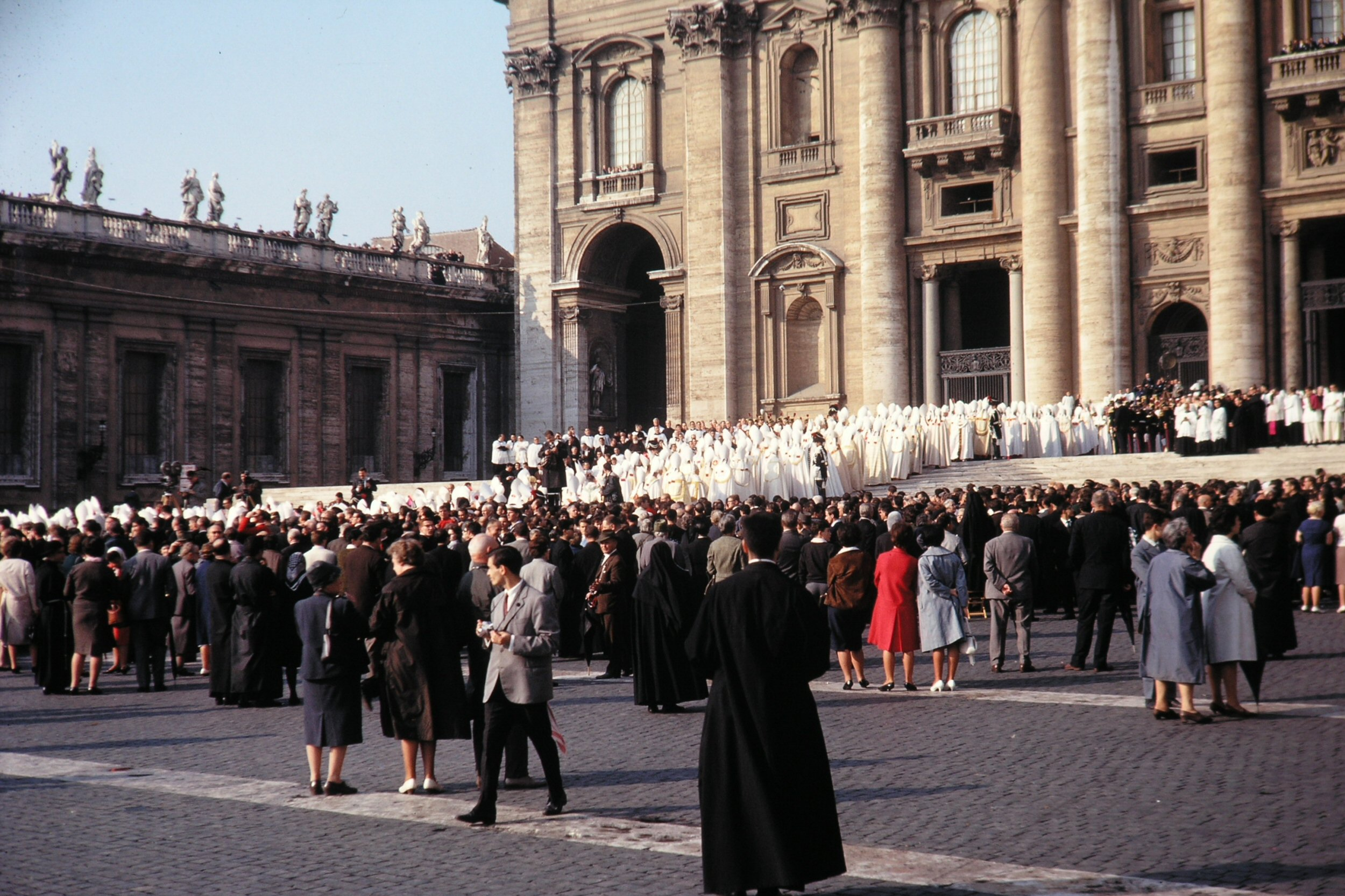
Tromp acted as an expert theological consult at the Second Vatican Council (opening procession shown), but most of his proposals were shelved.

=== Second Vatican Council ===
At the Second Vatican Council, Tromp served as secretary of the Preparatory Theological Commission at the specific request of Pope John XXIII, and, later, as the secretary of the Doctrinal Commission under Cardinal Alfredo Ottaviani. His preparations—or schemata—were shelved, after some Western European Council fathers appealed to Pope John XXIII for total free debate on all issues. Karl Rahner considered Tromp to be a formidable theological opponent during the council debates, and gently asserted that "[Tromp] thought his schemata would simply need the blessing of the Council fathers and that would be the council. But all his schemata disappeared—not a single one was discussed".

==== Ratzinger and Tromp ====
Others opposed Tromp as well. At the Council, Karl Rahner was joined by Joseph Ratzinger (the future Pope Benedict XVI), Aloys Grillmeier, Otto Semmelroth and Hans Küng, all of whom worked for the German Cardinals Josef Frings of Cologne and Julius Döpfner of Munich and Freising. Some of them opposed the schemata drawn up by Ottaviani and Tromp's preparatory commission, and when the group achieved the shelving of these schemata, it meant that the Council Fathers no longer had any written basis of preparation, and, consequently, that the conciliar bishops had no structure, strategy, or agenda to rely on.

Ratzinger was opposed to this radical move by the Rahner group, believing that it effectively derailed the Council. In his memoirs, he presents a balanced view of Tromp's schemata:

[Cardinal Joseph Frings] began to send me [the schemata] regularly in order to have my criticism and suggestions for improvement. Naturally I took exception to certain things, but I found no grounds for a radical rejection of what was being proposed. It is true that the documents bore only weak traces of the biblical and patristic renewal of the last decades, so that they gave an impression of rigidity and narrowness through their excessive dependency on scholastic theology. In other words, they reflected more the thought of scholars than that of shepherds. But I must say that they had a solid foundation and had been carefully elaborated.

== Theological influence ==
One of Tromp's most notable contributions is his support of Pope Pius XII in ghostwriting the encyclical Mystici corporis Christi in 1943. Encyclicals from that time period with similar phraseology (e.g., Mediator Dei and Humani generis) may have been influenced by him as well, but the extent of this influence is not known. He also felt a deep intellectual connection to Saint Robert Bellarmine—the selection of writings presented below is enough to evince his devotion.

=== "Subsistit in" in Lumen Gentium ===
Recently Tromp's theology has merited some attention in relation to the Vatican II definition on the identity of the Catholic Church with the Body of Christ, which he influenced. The Council stated that "the Church of Christ subsists in (subsistit in) the Catholic Church". Father Karl J. Becker, a professor at the Gregorian University, has argued that the phrase "subsists in" was intended by Tromp "to reiterate that the Church of Christ, with the fullness of the means instituted by Christ, perdures forever in the Catholic Church". (Note: Becker is an intellectual architect of the evangelical Catholic school, and his article drew on a dissertation written under him at Rome's Gregorian University by a young German scholar named Alexandra von Teuffenbach, one of the first to draw on Tromp's diaries as a theological expert at Vatican II.) To some this interpretation signifies the roll-back of an "open Church" concept, while to others it documents consistency in the theology of Sebastian Tromp and the Roman Catholic Church as a whole.

=== Mariology ===
Before Vatican II, Tromp engaged in a debate with Gabriel Roschini regarding the position of Mary in the Mystical Body of Christ.

Roschini demonstrated that numerous writers, starting with Radulfus Ardens (d. 1200), used the metaphor of a "neck" to indicate Mary's role, and that even the Protestant reformer Johannes Oecolampadius used that image to describe Mary as mediator of all graces. (The neck had been used through the centuries as an allegory for vital communication within the body.) Roschini quoted Bernardino of Siena (d. 1444) to that effect: "Mary is the neck of our head, through which all gifts are given to his mystical body." Pope Pius X also considered the neck to be the best image, observing as much in his 1904 encyclical Ad diem illum.

Tromp, however, considered the heart, the superior of all parts of the body, a better image. In his defense, he quoted Thomas Aquinas and Pope Leo XIII. According to Tromp, the heart, being in so many ways incomparable to the other parts of the body, parallels the fact that no member of the Church can be compared to Mary. The heart, continued Tromp, is consubstantial with the head and the body, just as Mary's human nature participated with that of Christ and the members of his body. Tromp concluded that because of her motherly love of Christ and of all the members of his body, she deserves to be identified with the heart.

But Roschini was categorically opposed. The heart has influence over the head, and in view of Christ's nature, this is impossible: "After giving him human nature, the Blessed Virgin has no influence whatsoever on Christ as head of the Church". In Mystici corporis, Pius XII avoided this issue, calling Mary simply the "mother" of the mystical body. She was already mother of the head, he wrote, but under the cross she was named mother of all its parts.

He was member founder of the Pontifical Academy of Mary.

== Selected writings ==
Tromp published more than 130 books and articles during his lifetime. A selection of Tromp's theological writings—most published in Latin—follows:

Selected works

- De Romanorum piaculis, Leiden: G. F. Théonville, 1921, p. 158, OL 10715509W
- De Sacrae Scripturae inspiratione, Rome: Pontifical Gregorian University, 1932, p. 104, OL 18256431M
- De nativitate ecclesiae ex corde Iesu in cruce, Rome: Schola Typographica Pio X, 1932, p. 33, OL 10715508W
- Actio Catholica in Corpore Christ, Rome: A. Macione & Pisani, 1936, p. 51, OL 10715507W
- Corpus Christi quod est Ecclesia, Rome: Pontifical Gregorian University, 1946, OL 18571730M
  - Ann Condit, ed. (1960), Corpus Christi quod est Ecclesia, New York: Vantage Press, p. 239, OL 16429686M
- De revelatione christiana, Rome: Pontifical Gregorian University, 1931, p. 365, OL 18253008M

Selected articles from Gregorianum

- I. De Ecclesia Christi corpore, vol. XIII, pp. 177–210
- II. De actione catholica in corpore Christi, vol. XIII, pp. 321–372
- De nativitate Ecclesiae ex Corde Iesu in Cruce, vol. XIII, pp. 489–527
- Tractatus S. Roberti Bellarmini iuvenis de praedestinatione: Introductio et editio autograph, vol. XIV, pp. 248–268
- Progressus doctrinalis in tractatibus S. Roberti Bellarmini de praedestinatione: Inquisitiones criticae et comparativae, vol. XIV, pp. 313–355
- De Bellarmini indice haereticorum Treviris reperto, vol. XV, pp. 187–214
- Quaestiunculae Bellarminianae, vol. XV, pp. 439–442
- Conspectus chronologicus praelectionum quas habuit S. Robertus Bellarminus in Collegio S. I. Lovaniensi et Collegio Romano, vol. XVI, pp. 97–105
- Ecclesia Sponsa Virgo Mater, vol. XVIII, pp. 3–29
- S. Robertus Bellarminus et Beata Virgo, vol. XXI, pp. 161–182
- De Sancti Roberti Bellarmini Contionibus Lovaniensibus, vol. XXI, pp. 383–412
- De "Explanatione" et "Explanationibus" S.R. Bellarmini in Epistolas Paulinas, vol. XXII, pp. 353–379
- De biformi conceptu cum Christi mystici tum Corporis Christi mystici in Controversiis S.R. Bellarmini, vol. XXIII, pp. 279–290
- De duabus editionibus Concilii Tridentini, vol. XXXVIII, pp. 51–96
- De manuscriptis acta et declarationes antiquas S. Congregationis Conc. Trid. continentibus, vol. XXXVIII, pp. 93–129
- Caput influit sensum et motum: Col. ii,19 et Eph. iv,16 in luce traditionis, vol. XXXIX, pp. 353–366
- Prosper Fagnanus Boni, vol. XXXIX, pp. 770–772
- De primis secretariis S. Congregationis Concili, vol. XL, pp. 523–531
- Quomodo verbum sese conformet Corpori Ecclesiae, vol. XLI, pp. 451–466
- De futuro Concilio Vaticano II, vol. XLIII, pp. 5–11

Works edited

- Bellarmine, Robert, Liber de locis communibus continens Tractatum primum de R. Pontifice, Rome: Pontifical Gregorian University, p. 49, OL 583217W
- Bellarmine, Robert (1942–1969), Opera oratoria postuma, Rome: Pontifical Gregorian University, p. 11, OL 583226W
- Pius PP. XII (1944), Allocutiones tres ad S. Romanam Rotam habitae a.D. 1941, 1942, 1944, Rome: Pontifical Gregorian University, p. 80, OL 7480201W

== Notes and references ==
Notes

Sources

- Allen, John L. (28 August 2007), "Reform rollback or emerging 'sane modernity' – Evangelical Catholicism triumphant, Vatican watcher states", National Catholic Reporter, archived from the original on 10 December 2009
- Barten, J.T.P. (13 March 2008) [1979], "Tromp, Sebastiaan Peter Cornelis (1889–1975)", Biografisch Woordenboek van Nederland (in Dutch), Instituut voor Nederlandse Geschiedenis
- Bodem, Anton (1988), "In Mystischer Leib", Marienlexikon
- Rahner, Karl (1984), Bekenntnisse: Rückblick auf 80 Jahre (in German), Munich: Herold
- Ratzinger, Joseph (1998), Milestones: Memoirs 1927–1977, Ignatius Press, ISBN 0-89870-702-1
- Teuffenbach, Alexandra von (2004). "Tromp, Sebastian Kornelius Petrus". In Bautz, Traugott (ed.). Biographisch-Bibliographisches Kirchenlexikon (BBKL) (in German). Vol. 23. Nordhausen: Bautz. cols. 1505–1508. ISBN 3-88309-155-3.
