= Body of Christ =

Biblical phrase

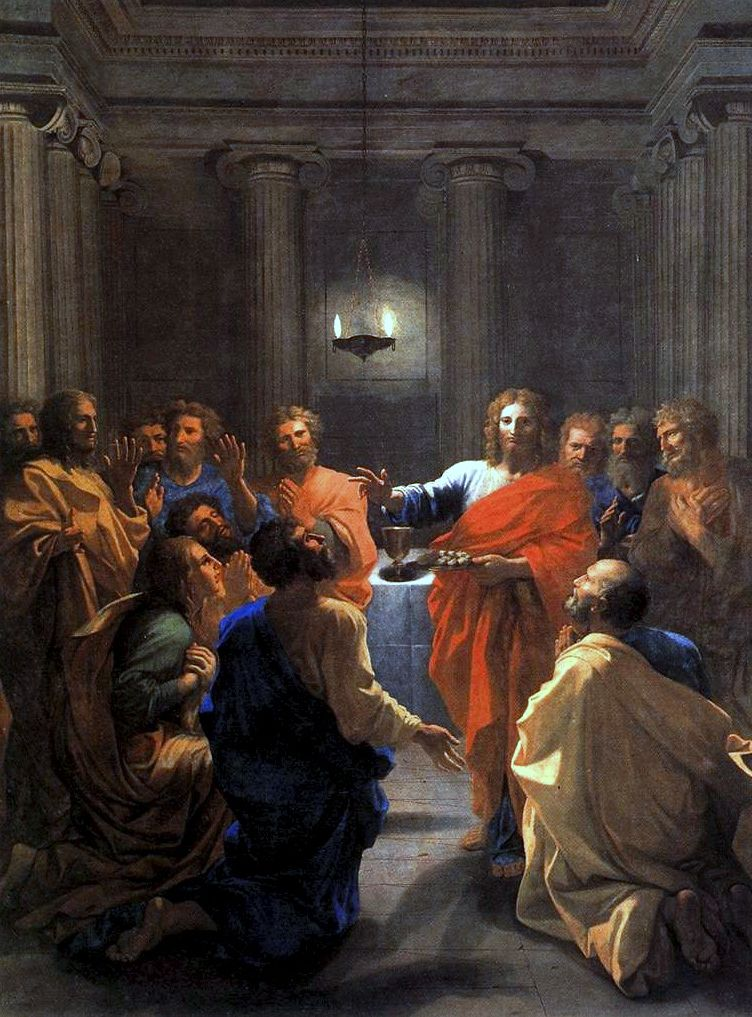
The Institution of the Eucharist by Nicolas Poussin, 1640

In Christian theology, the term Body of Christ (Latin: Corpus Christi) has two main but separate meanings: it may refer to Jesus Christ's words over the bread at the celebration of the Jewish feast of Passover that "This is my body" in Luke 22:19–20 (see Last Supper § Institution of the Eucharist), or it may refer to all individuals who are "in Christ" (1 Corinthians 12:12–14; see Christian Church).

As used by Paul in the Pauline epistles "Body of Christ" refers to all individuals who "heard the word of truth, the gospel of your salvation, believed in him, were sealed with the promised Holy Spirit" (Ephesians 1:13), "are being built together into a dwelling place for God by the Spirit" (Ephesians 2:22), are "joined and held together by every joint with which it is equipped, when each part is working properly, makes the body grow so that it builds itself up in love" (Ephesians 4:16).

There are significant differences in how Christians understand the term as used by Christ at the Last Supper and as developed in Eucharistic theology. For some it may be symbolic, for others it becomes a more literal or mystical understanding.

In Catholic theology the use of the phrase "mystical body" distinguishes the mystical body of Christ, i.e. the Church, from the physical body of Christ, and from a "moral body", such as any club with a common purpose. In Eastern Orthodoxy, the term "mystical body of Christ" is also applied to the Eastern Orthodox Church in the sense that "mystical union with Christ is a reality in his Church".

== Eucharist and real presence ==
A belief in the real presence of Christ in the Eucharist is taught in Catholicism, Eastern Orthodoxy, Oriental Orthodoxy, the Church of the East, the Moravian Church, Lutheranism, Anglicanism, Methodism and Reformed Christianity, though each tradition teaches a unique view of the doctrine. Efforts at mutual understanding of the range of beliefs by these Churches led in the 1980s to consultations on Baptism, Eucharist and Ministry by the World Council of Churches.

=== Catholicism ===
While teaching that in the bread consecrated in the Eucharist there is absolutely no change open to the senses or to scientific investigation, the Catholic Church supports the real presence, i.e. that the reality of the bread is changed into that of the body of Christ. The Church teachings refer to this change as one of the "substance" or "transubstantiation". It rejects the Lollard doctrine of "consubstantiation", which suggests that the substance or reality of the bread remains after the consecration, instead of being converted or changed into that of the body of Christ. At the same time, the Church holds that all that can be examined either directly or by scientific investigation – what in Aristotelian philosophy are called the "accidents" (as opposed to the reality) – remains quite unchanged.

In the Roman Rite, the priest or other minister who gives the consecrated host to a communicant says, "The body of Christ", and the communicant responds with, "Amen".

Since the consecrated bread is believed to be the body of Christ and sacred, what remains of the host after celebration of Mass is kept in the church tabernacle. This is primarily for the purpose of taking Communion to the sick, but also to serve as a focal point for private devotion and prayer. On appropriate occasions, there may be public Eucharistic adoration.

Christ also associated himself with the poor of the world and this is also called the Body of Christ. "If we truly wish to encounter Christ, we have to touch his body in the suffering bodies of the poor, as a response to the sacramental communion bestowed in the Eucharist. The Body of Christ, broken in the sacred liturgy, can be seen, through charity and sharing, in the faces and persons of the most vulnerable of our brothers and sisters", said Pope Francis on launching the World Day of the Poor.

The doctrine of the Mystical Body of Christ was anticipated by the Whole Christ (in Latin: Christus Totus) of Saint Augustine of Hippo.

=== Eastern Orthodoxy ===
The Eastern Orthodox Church also believes that the Eucharistic elements of bread and wine become the actual body and blood of Christ. It has authoritatively used the term "Transubstantiation" to describe this change, as in The Longer Catechism of The Orthodox, Catholic, Eastern Church (Catechism of St. Filaret of Moscow) and in the decrees of the 1672 Synod of Jerusalem.

=== Lutheranism ===
Martin Luther reasoned that because divinity involves omnipresence, the body of Christ can be present in the Eucharist because of its participation in the divine nature.

In current Lutheran teachings, the Body of Christ is used in a somewhat similar form to the Catholic teachings, but the Lutherans reject the Catholic teaching of transubstantiation, instead teaching the doctrine of the sacramental union. For the Lutheran, the Body of Christ is the formal title of the sacramental bread in the Eucharist, as seen in the Lutheran Divine Service.

=== Moravianism ===
Nicolaus Zinzendorf, a bishop of the Moravian Church, stated that Holy Communion is the "most intimate of all connection with the person of the Saviour." The Moravian Church adheres to a view known as the "sacramental presence", teaching that in the sacrament of Holy Communion:

Christ gives his body and blood according to his promise to all who partake of the elements. When we eat and drink the bread and the wine of the Supper with expectant faith, we thereby have communion with the body and blood of our Lord and receive the forgiveness of sins, life, and salvation. In this sense, the bread and wine are rightly said to be Christ's body and blood which he gives to his disciples.

=== Reformed Christianity ===
The Reformed Churches, which include the Continental Reformed, Reformed Anglican, Presbyterian, Congregationalist and Reformed Baptist traditions, teach the pneumatic presence of Christ in the Lord's Supper—that Christ is really spiritually present in the sacrament of Holy Communion. The Congregationalist theologian Alfred Ernest Garvie explicated the Congregationalist belief regarding the pneumatic presence in The Holy Catholic Church from the Congregational Point of View:

He is really present at the Lord's Supper without any such limitation to the element unless we are prepared to maintain that the material is more real than the spiritual. It is the whole Christ who presents Himself to faith, so that the believer has communion with Him.

=== Methodism ===
Methodists teach the real presence of Christ in the Eucharist, but maintain that the way he is made present to be a Holy Mystery. The Discipline of the Free Methodist Church thus teaches:

The Lord's Supper is a sacrament of our redemption by Christ's death. To those who rightly, worthily, and with faith receive it, the bread which we break is a partaking of the body of Christ; and likewise the cup of blessing is a partaking of the blood of Christ. The supper is also a sign of the love and unity that Christians have among themselves. Christ, according to his promise, is really present in the sacrament. –Discipline, Free Methodist Church

== The Church ==
=== Catholicism ===
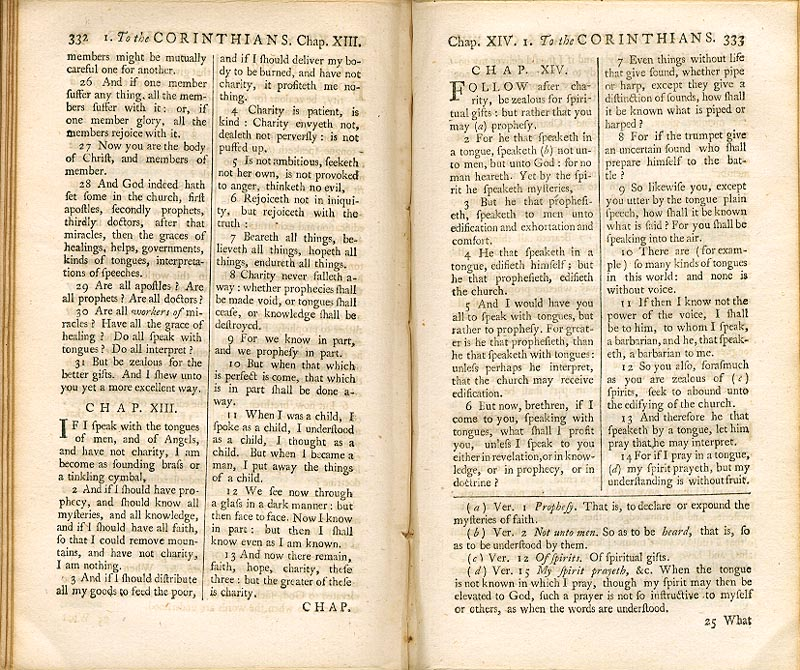
1 Corinthians, from the Douai Bible, 1749

For as the body is one, and hath many members, and all the members of that one body, being many, are one body: so also is Christ. For by one Spirit are we all baptized into one body, whether we be Jews or Gentiles, whether we be bond or free; and have been all made to drink into one Spirit. For the body is not one member, but many.

— Paul of Tarsus, 1 Corinthians 12:12–14

The first meaning that Catholics attach to the expression "Body of Christ" is the Catholic Church. The Catechism of the Catholic Church quotes with approval, as "summing up the faith of the holy doctors and the good sense of the believer", the reply of Saint Joan of Arc to her judges: "About Jesus Christ and the Church, I simply know they're just one thing, and we shouldn't complicate the matter." In the same passage, it also quotes Saint Augustine: "Let us rejoice then and give thanks that we have become not only Christians, but Christ himself. Do you understand and grasp, brethren, God's grace toward us? Marvel and rejoice: we have become Christ. For if he is the head, we are the members; he and we together are the whole man.... the fullness of Christ then is the head and the members. But what does 'head and members' mean? Christ and the Church." In light of all this, the Catholic Church calls itself the "universal sacrament of salvation" for the whole world, as it dispenses the sacraments which give the grace of Christ to the recipient.

Saint Paul the Apostle spoke of this unity of Christians with Christ, referred to in the New Testament also in images such as that of the vine and the branches, in terms of a single body that has Christ as its head in Romans 12:5,1 Corinthians 12:12–27, Ephesians 3:6 and 5:23, Colossians 1:18 and 1:24.

According to the Catechism of the Catholic Church, "the comparison of the Church with the body casts light on the intimate bond between Christ and his Church. Not only is she gathered around him; she is united in him, in his body. Three aspects of the Church as the Body of Christ are to be more specifically noted: the unity of all her members with each other as a result of their union with Christ; Christ as head of the Body; and the Church as bride of Christ." The Catechism spells out the significance of each of these three aspects.

To distinguish the Body of Christ in this sense from his physical body, the term "Mystical Body of Christ" is often used. This term was used as the first words, and so as the title, of the encyclical Mystici Corporis Christi of Pope Pius XII. In that document, Pope Pius XII in 1943 states, "the mystical Body of Christ... is the Catholic Church." But in 1964 the Catholic bishops gathered at the Second Vatican Council, while acknowledging that "full incorporation" in the Church required union with the Sovereign Pontiff, described various degrees of being "conjoined" or "related" to the Church including all persons of good will, which was not something new. The council's decree on Ecumenism stated that "all who have been justified by faith in Baptism are members of Christ's body" (3). That is, those who do not present an obstacle ("obex") to the reality of the Sacrament taking place, such as formal schism or formal heresy.

=== Eastern Orthodoxy ===
The Eastern Orthodox Church considers itself to be the body of Christ Paul of Tarsus speaks about in his letters. It considers itself to be sinless, since it is the body of Christ, but that its members are "fallible and sinful."

It is also believed in Eastern Orthodoxy that the Eastern Orthodox Church is the "mystical body of Christ", in the sense that "mystical union with Christ is a reality in his Church".

=== Protestantism ===
In modern teachings, the "Body of Christ" is used by other Protestants to collectively describe believers in Christ, as opposed to only those who are members of the Catholic Church. In this sense, Christians are members of the universal body of Christ not because of identification with the institution of the Church, but through identification with Christ directly through faith. This theology is based on several passages in the Bible, including Romans 12:5,1 Corinthians 12:12–27, Ephesians 3:6, 4:15–16 and 5:23, Colossians 1:18 and 1:24. Jesus Christ is seen as the "head" of the body, which is the church, while the "members" of the body are seen as members of the Church. In this way, Protestantism defines the "Body of Christ" in a much broader way than does the Catholic Church. This has allowed for a broad base within Christianity to call themselves part of the "Body of Christ."

== See also ==
- Blood of Christ
- Bride of Christ
- Sacramental bread
- Body politic
