= Lumen gentium =

Catholic ecclesiology text of the Second Vatican Council

Lumen gentium, the Dogmatic Constitution on the Church, is one of the principal documents of the Second Vatican Council. This dogmatic constitution was promulgated by Pope Paul VI on 21 November 1964, following approval by the assembled bishops by a vote of 2,151 to 5. As is customary with significant Catholic Church documents, it is known by its incipit, "Lumen gentium", Latin for 'Light of the Nations'.

The eight chapters of the document can be paired thematically: chapters one and two treat the church's nature and historical existence, chapters three and four treat different roles in the church, chapters five and six treat holiness and religious life, while chapters seven and eight discuss the saints and Mary.

== Contents ==
=== Chapter 1: The Mystery of the Church (1–8) ===
In its first chapter on ecclesiology, the constitution states that "all the just, from Adam and 'from Abel, the just one, to the last of the elect,' will be gathered together with the Father in the universal Church [...] a people made one with the unity of the Father, the Son and the Holy Spirit."(2) "Christ made His brothers, called together from all nations, mystically the components of His own Body."(7)

It goes on to describe "the sole Church of Christ which in the Creed is professed as one, holy, catholic and apostolic, which our Saviour, after His Resurrection, commissioned Peter to shepherd, and him and the other apostles to extend and direct with authority, which He erected for all ages as 'the pillar and mainstay of the truth.' This Church, constituted and organized as a society in the present world, subsists in the Catholic Church, which is governed by the successor of Peter and by the bishops in communion with him, although many elements of sanctification and of truth are found outside its visible confines."(8)

Pope Francis took a central theme of his pontificate from Lumen Gentium § 8 on the Church following Christ, "its poor and suffering founder" (8) in his poverty and humility, in order to bring the Good News to the poor.

=== Chapter 2: On The People of God (9–17) ===
==== The church is the people of God ====
One of the key portions of Lumen gentium is its second chapter, with its declaration that the Church is "the People of God":

At all times and in every race God has given welcome to whosoever fears Him and does what is right. God, however, does not make men holy and save them merely as individuals, without bond or link between one another. Rather has it pleased Him to bring men together as one people, a people which acknowledges Him in truth and serves Him in holiness [...] Christ instituted this new covenant, the new testament, that is to say, in His Blood, calling together a people made up of Jew and gentile, making them one, not according to the flesh but in the Spirit. This was to be the new People of God. For those who believe in Christ, who are reborn not from a perishable but from an imperishable seed through the word of the living God, not from the flesh but from water and the Holy Spirit, are finally established as "a chosen race, a royal priesthood, a holy nation, a purchased people [...] who in times past were not a people, but are now the people of God.(9)

==== Common and ministerial priesthoods ====
The three-fold ministry of Christ is also exercised by every baptized. Thus in a sense all the baptized share in the priesthood of Christ:

Though they differ from one another in essence and not only in degree, the common priesthood of the faithful and the ministerial or hierarchical priesthood are nonetheless interrelated: each of them in its own special way is a participation in the one priesthood of Christ. The ministerial priest, by the sacred power he enjoys, teaches and rules the priestly people; acting in the person of Christ, he makes present the eucharistic sacrifice, and offers it to God in the name of all the people. But the faithful, in virtue of their royal priesthood, join in the offering of the Eucharist. They likewise exercise that priesthood in receiving the sacraments, in prayer and thanksgiving, in the witness of a holy life, and by self-denial and active charity.(10)

==== Possibility of salvation for those outside the Church ====
In the second chapter, the Council teaches that God wills to save people not just as individuals but as a people. For this reason God chose the Israelite people to be his own people and established a covenant with it, as a preparation and figure of the covenant ratified in Christ that constitutes the new People of God, which would be one, not according to the flesh, but in the Spirit and which is called the Church of Christ.(9)

Consequently, "it [the Council] teaches that the Church, now sojourning on earth as an exile, is necessary for salvation. Christ, present to us in His Body, which is the Church, is the one Mediator and the unique way of salvation." Those who "knowing that the Catholic Church was made necessary by Christ, would refuse to enter or to remain in it, could not be saved."(14)

All human beings are called to belong to the Church. Not all are yet fully incorporated into the Church, but "the Church recognizes that in many ways she is linked with those who, being baptized, are honored with the name of Christian, though they do not profess the faith in its entirety or do not preserve unity of communion with the successor of Peter."(15) In addition, the Council describes how non-Christians and non-theists are related to the Church and that God does not deny them the helps necessary for salvation:

Finally, those who have not yet received the Gospel are related in various ways to the people of God. In the first place we must recall the people to whom the testament and the promises were given and from whom Christ was born according to the flesh. On account of their fathers this people remains most dear to God, for God does not repent of the gifts He makes nor of the calls He issues. But the plan of salvation also includes those who acknowledge the Creator. In the first place amongst these there are the Muslims, who, professing to hold the faith of Abraham, along with us adore the one and merciful God, who on the last day will judge mankind. Nor is God far distant from those who in shadows and images seek the unknown God, for it is He who gives to all men life and breath and all things, and as Saviour wills that all men be saved. Those also can attain to salvation who through no fault of their own do not know the Gospel of Christ or His Church, yet sincerely seek God and moved by grace strive by their deeds to do His will as it is known to them through the dictates of conscience. Nor does Divine Providence deny the helps necessary for salvation to those who, without blame on their part, have not yet arrived at an explicit knowledge of God and with His grace strive to live a good life.(16)

==== New Evangelization ====
The New Evangelization message in the Catholic Church is rooted in LG 17 and is one of the signs that the Church is seeking to fulfill Lumen Gentium. As the Father sent the Son, so he too sent the Apostles (Matthew 28:18–20).

=== Chapter 3: The Hierarchical Structure of the Church and In Particular on the Episcopate (18–29) ===
The third chapter of the document, which spoke of the bishops as a "college"(22) that, within the Church, succeeds to the place of the "college" or "stable group" of the apostles(19) and is "the subject of supreme and full power over the universal Church, provided we understand this body together with its head, the Roman Pontiff."(22)

Conservative bishops in the council were fearful that the idea of the College of Bishops would be interpreted as a new conciliarism, a 15th-century idea that an ecumenical council was the supreme authority under Christ in the Catholic Church. Of the members of the council, 322, a substantial minority, voted against any mention whatever in the document of a "college" of bishops), and were now proposing 47 amendments to chapter III. Accordingly, a "Preliminary Note of Explanation" (in Latin, Nota explicativa praevia, often referred to as "the Nota praevia") intended to reconcile them with the text was added on 16 November 1964. The Note reaffirmed that the college of bishops exercises its authority only with the assent of the pope, thus safeguarding the primacy and pastoral independence of the pope.

The Note achieved its purpose: on the following day, 17 November, the No votes against chapter III dropped to 46, a number that may have included some who opposed it because they felt the Preliminary Note of Explanation had weakened the concept of collegiality. In the final vote on 18 November only five of the 2200+ participants voted against the dogmatic constitution as a whole.

The Note is introduced by the following words: "A preliminary note of explanation is being given to the Council Fathers from higher authority, regarding the Modi bearing on Chapter III of the Schema de Ecclesia; the doctrine set forth in Chapter III ought to be explained and understood in accordance with the meaning and intent of this explanatory note." "Higher authority" refers to the Pope, Paul VI, and "the Schema de Ecclesia" to the draft text for the dogmatic constitution Lumen gentium. By "the Modi" is meant the proposals for amendments of that draft text which some of the Council participants had presented.

The Note was thus added by papal authority, consistently with the idea that the consent of the Pope, as head of the College of Bishops was necessary, and that he had the "right to make his consent dependent on an interpretation determined in advance".

The Preliminary Note of Explanation did not in fact alter the value of the statement on collegiality in the text of Lumen gentium: it "strengthened the adherence to the doctrine of the First Vatican Council on the primacy, but it did not subsequently strike out anything from the direct divine origin of the episcopal office and its function, and the responsibility of the College of Bishops for the Universal Church."

Part 4 of the Note reads:

As Supreme Pastor of the Church, the Supreme Pontiff can always exercise his power at will, as his very office demands. Though it is always in existence, the College is not as a result permanently engaged in strictly collegial activity; the Church's Tradition makes this clear. In other words, the College is not always fully active [in actu pleno]; rather, it acts as a college in the strict sense only from time to time and only with the consent of its head. The phrase 'with the consent of its head' is used to avoid the idea of dependence on some kind of outsider; the term "consent" suggests rather communion between the head and the members, and implies the need for an act which belongs properly to the competence of the head. This is explicitly affirmed in n. 22, 12 (Note: A reference to part of the text of Lumen gentium) and is explained at the end of that section. The word "only" takes in all cases. It is evident from this that the norms approved by the supreme authority must always be observed. Cf. Modus 84 It is clear throughout that it is a question of the bishops acting in conjunction with their head, never of the bishops acting independently of the Pope. In the latter instance, without the action of the head, the bishops are not able to act as a College: this is clear from the concept of "College." This hierarchical communion of all the bishops with the Supreme Pontiff is certainly firmly established in Tradition.

Bishop Christopher Butler, a major contributor to the council and strong proponent of its teachings, finds that the document gives a "reaffirmation" to "a genuine sacramental episcopal collegiality" which was thrown into the background by the premature ending of Vatican I. He goes on to say:

This seems to afford the basis for a recovery of the principle that the papacy—and now we must add the episcopate—is not the source of the actual life of the Church, but the coordinator of that life's various and peripheral spontaneities. This principle of subsidiarity is carried through to the point at which the lay Catholic is seen as a genuine creative force in the life of the People of God; and to the further point where it is realised that the whole human family, insofar as good will prevails, is a theatre of the operations of the grace-gifts of the Holy Spirit, and is cooperating in the building up of Christ's kingdom.

He concludes that the Church which makes contemporary the saving truth of the gospel "is the sign and the instrument of the unity of the whole human race."

This part of the document also endorsed the revival of the office of deacon as found in the early church, as a permanent vocation rather than a stage through which candidates for the priesthood pass, as had been the case since about the 5th century, and that it should open to married men. It said that:

[T]he diaconate can in the future be restored as a proper and permanent rank of the hierarchy. It pertains to the competent territorial bodies of bishops, of one kind or another, with the approval of the Supreme Pontiff, to decide whether and where it is opportune for such deacons to be established for the care of souls. With the consent of the Roman Pontiff, this diaconate can, in the future, be conferred upon men of more mature age, even upon those living in the married state. It may also be conferred upon suitable young men, for whom the law of celibacy must remain intact.

=== Chapter 4: The Laity (30–38) ===
The laity are gathered together in the People of God and make up the Body of Christ under one Head. Whoever they are they are called upon, as living members, to expend all their energy for the growth of the Church and its continuous sanctification [...] Through their baptism and confirmation all are commissioned to that apostolate by the Lord Himself. Moreover, by the sacraments, especially holy Eucharist, that charity toward God and man which is the soul of the apostolate is communicated and nourished. Now the laity are called in a special way to make the Church present and operative in those places and circumstances where only through them can it become the salt of the earth. (33)

But the Lord wishes to spread His kingdom also by means of the laity, namely, a kingdom of truth and life, a kingdom of holiness and grace, a kingdom of justice, love and peace. (36)

=== Chapter 5: The Universal Call to Holiness in the Church (39–42) ===
The theme of the universal call to holiness was built on in the fifth chapter:

Thus it is evident to everyone, that all the faithful of Christ of whatever rank or status, are called to the fullness of the Christian life and to the perfection of charity; by this holiness as such a more human manner of living is promoted in this earthly society. In order that the faithful may reach this perfection, they must use their strength accordingly as they have received it, as a gift from Christ. They must follow in His footsteps and conform themselves to His image seeking the will of the Father in all things. They must devote themselves with all their being to the glory of God and the service of their neighbor. In this way, the holiness of the People of God will grow into an abundant harvest of good, as is admirably shown by the life of so many saints in Church history. The classes and duties of life are many, but holiness is one—that sanctity which is cultivated by all who are moved by the Spirit of God, and who obey the voice of the Father and worship God the Father in spirit and in truth. These people follow the poor Christ, the humble and cross-bearing Christ in order to be worthy of being sharers in His glory. Every person must walk unhesitatingly according to his own personal gifts and duties in the path of living faith, which arouses hope and works through charity.(40, 41)

=== Chapter 6: Religious (43–47) ===
Chapter 6 is concerned with those members of the church who profess "the evangelical counsels of chastity dedicated to God, poverty and obedience", their origin, and the duty of the church to interpret them. The text states that

The religious state clearly manifests that the Kingdom of God and its needs, in a very special way, are raised above all earthly considerations. Finally, it clearly shows all men, both the unsurpassed breadth of the strength of Christ the King and the infinite power of the Holy Spirit, marvelously working in the Church.

The religious life, considered a "deepening of the baptismal character", is conducive to the building up of others and the world in Christ. Its diversity is stressed: there are "various forms of solidarity and community life, as well as various religious families".

This chapter provides a doctrinal basis for the Council's call for the renewal and adaptation of the religious life set out in its later decree Perfectae Caritatis (1965).

=== Chapter 7: The Eschatological Nature of the Pilgrim Church and Its Union with the Church in Heaven (48–51) ===
Chapter 7 affirms the oneness of the Church on earth with the Church in heaven. It makes an indirect allusion to the future fulfillment of Bible prophecy in history. It continues themes of sanctification and holiness from earlier sections. It affirms the ancient Church practices of remembering the saints and imploring their intercession. It affirms "the sacred Liturgy, wherein the power of the Holy Spirit acts upon us through sacramental signs" and anticipates worship in heaven.

Until the Lord shall come in His majesty, and all the angels with Him and death being destroyed, all things are subject to Him, some of His disciples are exiles on earth, some having died are purified, and others are in glory beholding "clearly God Himself triune and one, as He is"; but all in various ways and degrees are in communion in the same charity of God and neighbor and all sing the same hymn of glory to our God. For all who are in Christ, having His Spirit, form one Church and cleave together in Him. (49)

=== Chapter 8: The Blessed Virgin Mary, Mother of God, in the Mystery of Christ and the Church (52–69) ===
The chapter on Mary was the subject of debate, since the original plans had called for a separate document about the role of Mary, keeping the document on the Church "ecumenical," not to offend Protestant Christians, who were suspicious of special veneration of Mary. However, the Council Fathers, supported by the Pope, insisted that, considering that Mary's place is within the Church, her treatment should be addressed by the Church's Constitution.

Vatican II was sensitive to the views of other Christians, as the council, at the request of Pope John XXIII, sought to promote Christian unity; however, it was aware that concepts about Mary varied among other Christians, especially Protestants. The council, once referring to Mary as "Mediatrix", took her as an example of strengthening – not decreasing – confidence in Christ as the one essential Mediator. When speaking of Mary, the council used a biblical approach, strongly emphasizing her pilgrimage of faith. It also drew significantly from the Fathers of the Church, who were respected by all Christian denominations.

Pope Paul VI, in a speech to the council fathers, called the document "a vast synthesis of the Catholic doctrine regarding the place which the Blessed Mary occupies in the mystery of Christ and of the Church".

Bishop Christopher Butler mentions that prior to Vatican II, the one area where uncritical development of Catholic theology was allowed, apart from the total life of theology, was in devotion to Mary, so that "it began to seem that the Catholicism of the future would approximate more and more to the condition of an Italian tribal cult". This century-long drift was brought to an end by the Council on October 29, 1963, "a fixed point of the Marian paradigm shift", the date on which the Council decided, in a very close vote, not to give Mary a separate document but to situate her properly within the larger Church.

[I]n the most holy Virgin the Church has already reached that perfection whereby she is without spot or wrinkle. (65)

== Contributors ==
Marie Rosaire Gagnebet O.P. (1904–1983), professor of theology at the Pontifical University of St. Thomas Aquinas, Angelicum from 1938 to 1976 and peritus during Vatican II, was influential in the redaction of the Lumen gentium.

== Issues surrounding the document ==
=== Traditionalist reaction ===
Certain Traditionalist Catholic groups, particularly Sedevacantists, consider Lumen gentium to be the demarcation of when the Roman Church fell into heresy, pointing to the use of "subsistit in" rather than "est" as an abdication of the Church's historic (and to them compulsory) identification of itself alone as God's church. In an interview with the Frankfurter Allgemeine Zeitung, Cardinal Joseph Ratzinger responded to this criticism:

The concept expressed by 'is' (to be) is far broader than that expressed by 'to subsist'. 'To subsist' is a very precise way of being, that is, to be as a subject, which exists in itself. Thus the Council Fathers meant to say that the being of the Church as such is a broader entity than the Roman Catholic Church, but within the latter it acquires, in an incomparable way, the character of a true and proper subject.

=== Possibility of salvation outside the Catholic Church ===
One point of confusion was the document's treatment of the possibility of salvation outside of the Catholic Church. In 2000, Pope John Paul II issued Dominus Iesus with the theme of "the unicity and salvific universality of Jesus Christ and the Church". He also stated earlier in the encyclical, Redemptoris Missio, "The universality of salvation means that it is granted not only to those who explicitly believe in Christ and have entered the Church", thus affirming the belief that not only Catholics can achieve salvation and sanctification. Such a belief has been controversial among many traditionalist Catholics to this day.

== See also ==
- Light unto the nations
