= Humani generis =

1950 papal encyclical

Humani generis Encyclical of Pope Pius XII
- Signature date: 12 August 1950
- Number: 18 of the pontificate

Humani generis is a papal encyclical that Pope Pius XII promulgated on 12 August 1950, "concerning some false opinions threatening to undermine the foundations of Catholic Doctrine". It primarily discussed, the encyclical says, "new opinions" which may "originate from a reprehensible desire of novelty" and their consequences on the Church.

Notably, it began a process of gradual reform within the Catholic Church towards compatibility between Catholicism and biological evolution.

== Influences ==
There was speculation that Father Sebastiaan Tromp SJ, professor of theology at the Pontifical Gregorian University, had assisted in drafting the encyclical.

Réginald Garrigou-Lagrange OP (1877–1964), professor of the Pontifical University of Saint Thomas Aquinas, is said to have been a major influence on the content of the encyclical.

== Content ==
=== Role of theology ===
Humani generis states: "This deposit of faith our Divine Redeemer has given for authentic interpretation not to each of the faithful, not even to theologians, but only to the teaching authority of the Church."

In Humani generis, Pope Pius held a corporate view of theology. Theologians, employed by the Church, are assistants, to teach the official teachings of the Church and not their own private thoughts. They are free to engage in all kinds of empirical research, which the Church will generously support, but in matters of morality and religion, they are subjected to the teaching office and authority of the Church, the Magisterium.

The most noble office of theology is to show how a doctrine defined by the Church is contained in the sources of revelation […] in that sense in which it has been defined by the Church.

Humani generis is critical of some trends in modern theology, but does not mention or attack individual opinions or even groups of dissenting theologians.

The Pope later refers to a new axiom: "a new intellectual current, a new public mood within the Church, and, new behaviour patterns" of its members. He asked his fellow bishops, to heal this "intellectual infection", which should not be allowed to grow.

In areas of both "human sciences and sacred theology", the encyclical authorized "research and discussions" where "reasons for both opinions, that is, those favorable and those unfavorable to evolution" were to "be weighed and judged."

=== Obstacles to finding God ===
Humani generis begins with a recognition of several obstacles to seek and find God by the light of reason alone:

Though human reason is, strictly speaking, truly capable by its own natural power and light of attaining to a true and certain knowledge of the one personal God, Who watches over and controls the world by His providence, and of the natural law written in our hearts by the Creator; yet there are many obstacles which prevent reason from the effective and fruitful use of this inborn faculty. For the truths that concern the relations between God and man wholly transcend the visible order of things and if they are translated into human action and influence it, they call for self-surrender and abnegation. The human mind, in its turn, is hampered in the attaining of such truths, not only by the impact of the senses and the imagination, but also by disordered appetites which are the consequences of original sin. So it happens that men, in such matters, easily persuade themselves that what they would not like to be true is false or at least doubtful.

This is why man stands in need of being truthfully enlightened by God's revelation.

=== Four issues ===
Having thus established a main principle, the encyclical continues with a review of the philosophical currents of modern culture and their potential and dangers in light of divine revelation of faith in the distinct levels. It reviews recent theological, philosophical and scientific developments.

==== Nouvelle théologie ====
In prior decades, there had been increasingly divisive debates in theology regarding the place of Catholic theology's intellectual tradition, especially scholasticism, in the doctrine of the Church. These debates involved prominent theologians, especially Dominicans and Jesuits, and it increasing pitted progressive French theologians and theological schools against more tradition-minded thinkers working in and around the Vatican. The term Nouvelle théologie came to be used to describe the more progressive group. Pius XII used this term pejoratively, and in the mid-to-late 1940s it was rumored among theologians that Garrigou-Lagrange was preparing an encyclical which would attack this theological school.

In describing erroneous development in the Catholic Church after World War II, the encyclical does not mention names, nor does it accuse specific persons or organizations. The encyclical states the nouvelle théologie and its followers viewed Catholic teaching as relative, that it departed from traditional neo-Thomism using relativistic historical analysis and engaging philosophical axioms, such as existentialism, or positivism. The encyclical further states that the Nouvelle théologie scholars expressed Catholic dogma with concepts of modern philosophy, immanentism or idealism or existentialism or any other system, and that some believed that the mysteries of faith could not be expressed by truly adequate concepts but only by approximate and ever-changeable notions. The encyclical also stated:

Everyone is aware that the terminology employed in the schools and even that used by the Teaching Authority of the Church itself is capable of being perfected and polished; and we know also that the Church itself has not always used the same terms in the same way. It is also manifest that the Church cannot be bound to every system of philosophy that has existed for a short space of time. Nevertheless, the things that have been composed through common effort by Catholic teachers over the course of the centuries to bring about some understanding of dogma are certainly not based on any such weak foundation. These things are based on principles and notions deduced from a true knowledge of created things. In the process of deducing, this knowledge, like a star, gave enlightenment to the human mind through the Church. Hence it is not astonishing that some of these notions have not only been used by the Ecumenical Councils, but even sanctioned by them, so that it is wrong to depart from them.

Pius pleads with the "rebels" not to tear down but to build up. He demands not to neglect, or to reject, or devalue so many and such great resources which have been conceived, expressed and perfected over the centuries. A new philosophy like existentialism, "today, like a flower of the field in existence, tomorrow outdated and old-fashioned, shaken by the winds of time", he says, is a poor and unstable basis for the theology of the Church.

==== Evolution ====
The encyclical took up a nuanced position with regard to evolution. It distinguished between the soul, held as created divinely, and the physical body, whose development may be subject to empirical and prudent study:

The Teaching Authority of the Church does not forbid that, in conformity with the present state of human sciences and sacred theology, research and discussions, on the part of men experienced in both fields, take place with regard to the doctrine of evolution, in as far as it inquires into the origin of the human body as coming from pre-existent and living matter – for the Catholic faith obliges us to hold that souls are immediately created by God.

The encyclical does not endorse a comprehensive acceptance of evolution, nor its outright rejection, because it deemed the evidence at the time not convincing. It allows for the possibility in the future:

This certainly would be praiseworthy in the case of clearly proved facts; but caution must be used when there is rather question of hypotheses, having some sort of scientific foundation, in which the doctrine contained in Sacred Scripture or in Tradition is involved.

The position de-linking the creation of body and soul has been more recently confirmed by Pope John Paul II, who highlighted additional facts supporting the theory of evolution half a century later.

==== Polygenism ====
The encyclical rejects the idea of polygenesis, stating:

"[T]the question of another conjectural opinion, namely polygenism ... the faithful cannot embrace that opinion which maintains that either after Adam there existed on this earth true men who did not take their origin through natural generation from him as from the first parent of all, or that Adam represents a certain number of human parents."

==== Old Testament critiques ====
A final critique is issued against negative interpretations which downgrade the Old Testament to historical half-truths, or which impute error to the alleged ancient sacred writers.

If, however, the ancient sacred writers have taken anything from popular narrations (and this may be conceded), it must never be forgotten that they did so with the help of divine inspiration, through which they were rendered immune from any error in selecting and evaluating those documents.

Therefore, whatever of the popular narrations have been inserted into the Sacred Scriptures must in no way be considered on a par with myths or other such things, which are more the product of an extravagant imagination than of that striving for truth and simplicity which in the Sacred Books, also of the Old Testament, is so apparent that our ancient sacred writers must be admitted to be clearly superior to the ancient profane writers.

Humani generis encourages further research, taking into account and respecting the holiness of the Old Testament scriptures to Jews and Christians alike.

=== Conclusion ===
Pope Pius XII, who usually employs diplomatic and carefully measured language in his writings, is convinced of the serious nature of those opinions threatening to (to quote the encyclical's subtitle) "undermine the foundation of Catholic doctrine", a most unusual tone for this pontiff.

Philosophy and theology are the main topics of this encyclical. But, it extends further into the realm of culture and science.

== Legacy ==
Fr. Brian Van Hove SJ states that Humani generis caused "a freezing of systematic theology into a Thomist orthodoxy", remarking that the "freeze" was later ameliorated by Pope John Paul II's 1993 Veritatis splendor. For example, Fr. Henri de Lubac SJ (later Cardinal de Lubac) wrote about his plan for a comprehensive theological project integrating "patristics, liturgy, history, philosophical reflection [...] The lightning bolt of Humani generis killed the project."

== See also ==
- Historicism
- Evolution and the Roman Catholic Church
