= Index of Catholic Church articles =

This is an index of Catholic Church articles. Portals and navigation boxes are at the bottom of the page. For a listing of Catholic Church articles by category, see Category:Catholic Church (and its various subcategories and pages) at the bottom of the page.

Principal articles are:

- Catholic Church
- Glossary of the Catholic Church
- Outline of the Catholic Church
- Timeline of the Catholic Church
- Index of Vatican City-related articles

For various other lists, see "L" (below).

== A ==
- Abbacy, Territorial
- Abbey
- Abbey, Territorial
- Abbess
- Abbot
- Abbot nullius
- Abbot primate
- Abortion
- Ad limina visits
- Africa, Catholic Church in (various articles)
- African pope
- Altarage
- American Cardinals Dinner
- Annulment
- Apostolic administrator
- Apostolic life, Society of
- Apostolic nuncio
- Apostolic Penitentiary
- Apostolic prefect
- Apostolic Signatura, The Supreme Tribunal of the
- Apostolic succession
- Apostolic vicar
- Appointment of Catholic bishops
- Archbishop
- Archdiocese
- Archiepiscopal See, Major
- Archiepiscopal Church, Major
- Asia, Catholic Church in (various articles)
- Assumptionist
- Augustinian Order
- Auxiliary bishop

== B ==
- The Bad Popes
- Baptism, Sacrament of
- Baptism of Jesus
- Beatification
- Benedict IX, Pope
- Benedict XII, Pope
- Benedict XIV, Pope
- Benedict XV, Pope
- Benedict XVI, Pope Emeritus
- Benedict XVI, Resignation of Pope
- Benedict XVI, Theology of Pope
- Benedictine
- Bible
- Birth control
- Bishops, Appointment of Catholic
- Bishop (Catholic Church)
- Bishop emeritus
- Blessed Virgin Mary
- Brother (Catholic)
- Bull
- Bullarium

== C ==
- Canon law (Catholic Church)
- Canon law, History of
- Capuchin Order
- Cardinal (Catholicism)
- Carmelites
- Carthusians
- Catechesis
- Catechism of the Catholic Church
- Catechumen
- Cathedra
- Cathedral
- Catholic Answers
- Catholic Bible
- Catholic Catechist
- Catholic Church (disambiguation)
- Catholic Church (various articles on history, hierarchy, theology, sacraments, Mariology, Doctors of the Church, Pope Benedict XVI, papal documents, Eastern Catholic Churches, Eastern rites, liturgical traditions) (see "Catholic Church" navigation box (below))
- Catholic Church and abortion
- Catholic Church and AIDS
- Catholic Church and capital punishment
- Catholic Church and colonialism
- Catholic Church and ecumenism
- Catholic Church and evolution
- Catholic Church and health care
- Catholic Church and HIV/AIDS
- Catholic Church and Nazi Germany
- Catholic Church and politics in the United States
- Catholic Church and science
- Catholic Church and slavery
- Catholic Church and the United Nations
- Catholic Church and women
- Catholic Church by country
- Catholic Church, Definition of the
- Catholic Church doctrine on the ordination of women
- Catholic Church hierarchy
- Catholic Church hierarchy (various articles) (see "Catholic Church" navigation box (below))
- Catholic Directory
- Catholic guilt
- Catholic King
- Catholic League (U.S.)
- Catholic liturgy
- Catholic Monarch
- Catholic Probabilism
- Catholic religious order
- Catholic religious orders, articles on various (see corresponding navigation box (below))
- Catholic Renewal
- Catholic school
- Catholic spirituality
- Catholic theology, History of (various articles) (see "History of Catholic theology" navigation box (below))
- Catholic theology of the body
- Catholicism
- Chancellor
- Chronology of Jesus*Coadjutor bishop
- Code of Canon Law (1983)
- Code of Canons of the Eastern Churches
- College of Cardinals
- Columbian Squires
- Communion and Liberation
- Concelebration
- Confirmation, Sacrament of
- Religious congregation
- Congregation (Roman Curia)
- Congregation for Bishops
- Congregation for Catholic Education
- Congregation for Divine Worship and the Discipline of the Sacraments
- Congregation for Institutes of Consecrated Life and Societies of Apostolic Life
- Congregation for the Causes of Saints
- Congregation for the Clergy
- Congregation for the Doctrine of the Faith
- Congregation for the Evangelization of Peoples
- Congregation for the Oriental Churches
- Consecrated life
- Consecrated life (Catholic Church)
- Consecrated life, Institute of
- Consecration
- Consultor
- Contraception
- Converts to Catholicism, List of
- Criticism of the Catholic Church
- Crozier
- Crucifix
- Cultural Catholic
- Curia, Moderator of the
- Curia (Catholic Church)
- Curia, Roman
- Customary (liturgy)

== D ==
- The Da Vinci Code
- Deacon
- Decree
- Definitor
- Devil
- Dicastery
- Diocesan administrator
- Diocesan bishop
- Diocesan chancery
- Diocesan priest
- Diocese
- Diocese of Rome
- Dioceses by country (various articles)
- Divine Mercy Sunday
- Doctor of the Church
- Doctrine on the ordination of women, Catholic Church
- Dominican Order

== E ==
- Easter
- Eastern Catholic Churches
- Eastern Catholic Churches and Eastern rites (various articles) (see "Catholic Church" navigation box (below))
- Eastern Catholic liturgy
- Ecclesiastical province
- Ecclesiastical provinces in the United States, List of (category)
- Ecclesiastical ring
- Economy of Salvation
- Ecumenical council
- Eden Invitation
- Encyclical
- Eparch
- Episcopal conference
- Episcopal succession
- Eternal Word Television Network (EWTN)
- Eucharist, Sacrament of
- Eucharistic Congress
- Europe, Catholic Church in (various articles)
- Exarch
- Excommunicated by the Catholic Church, List of people
- Excommunication
- Extraordinary minister of Holy Communion

== F ==
- Faithful Majesty
- Father Millet Cross
- Fellowship of Catholic University Students (FOCUS)
- First Communion
- Foreign relations of the Holy See
- Former Roman Catholic dioceses
- Formulary controversy
- Franciscan
- Franciscan Friars of the Renewal

== G ==
- Gaudium et spes
- General Roman Calendar
- Global organisation of the Catholic Church
- Glossary of the Catholic Church
- God
- Gregorian chant

== H ==
- Heaven
- Hell
- Historical list of the Catholic bishops of the United States
- History of Catholic theology
- History of Christianity
- History of Roman Catholicism in the United States
- History of the Catholic Church
- History of the Catholic Church since 1962
- History of the Catholic Church (various articles) (see "History of the Catholic Church" navigation box (below))
- History of the Papacy
- Holy Cross, Congregation of
- Holy Matrimony, Sacrament of
- Holy Orders (Catholic Church)
- Holy See
- Holy See and the United Nations

== I ==
- Incense, Religious use of
- Index of Vatican City-related articles
- Indult
- Indult of exclaustration
- Institute of consecrated life
- Institute, Religious
- Institute, Secular

== J ==
- Jesuits
- Jesus
- John XXIII, Pope
- John Paul I, Pope
- John Paul II, Pope
- Judaism, Pope John Paul II and
- Judaism, Relations between Catholicism and

== K ==
- Knights of Columbus
- Knights of Columbus Building (New Haven, Connecticut)
- Knights of Columbus, Supreme Knight of the
- Knights of the Holy Sepulchre

== L ==
- Laity
- Lapsed Catholic
- Latin Church
- Latin liturgical rites
- Law, Canon
- Lay Ecclesial Ministry
- Lay communion
- Legends surrounding the papacy
- Lednica 2000
- Life of Jesus in the New Testament
- Life Teen
- Limbo
- List of Catholic bishops of the United States
- List of Catholic dioceses in Canada
- List of Catholic priests
- List of Catholic religious institutes
- List of Catholic rites and churches
- List of Catholic saints
- List of current patriarchs (including Catholic)
- List of diplomatic missions of the Holy See
- List of Eastern Catholic seminaries
- List of former Roman Catholics
- List of Knights of Columbus members
- List of current cardinals (sortable by name, country, and birthdate)
- List of names of popes
- List of papal elections
- List of popes
- List of Roman Catholic archdioceses (by country and continent)
- List of Roman Catholic dioceses (alphabetical) (including archdioceses)
- List of Roman Catholic dioceses (structured view) (including archdioceses)
- List of Roman Catholic dioceses in Oceania
- List of Roman Catholic seminaries
- List of sexually active popes
- List of the Catholic bishops of the United States
- List of the Catholic cathedrals of the United States
- List of the Catholic dioceses of the United States
- List of Catholic bishops of India
- Lists of patriarchs (including Catholic)
- Lists of patriarchs, archbishops, and bishops
- Lists of Roman Catholics (category)
- Liturgical traditions of the Catholic Church (various articles) (see "Catholic Church" navigation box (below))
- Liturgies of the Catholic Church (various articles) (see "Sacraments, Rites, and Liturgies of the Catholic Church" navigation box (below))
- Lumen gentium

== M ==
- Mariology
- Mary, the Holy Mother of God
- Mass (liturgy)
- Mass (music)
- Mass (Roman_Rite)
- Mediatrix
- Medieval Restorationism
- Metropolitan bishop
- Milagro (votive)
- Military of Vatican City
- Military ordinariate
- Minister (Catholic_Church)
- Ministry of Jesus
- Miracles of Jesus
- Mission sui juris
- Mitre
- Moderator of the Curia
- Modernism (Roman Catholicism)
- The Monastery (BBC TV series)
- Monsignor
- Mother of God Community
- Mystery of Crowning

== N ==
- North America, Catholic Church in (various articles)
- Nostra aetate
- Nun
- Nunciature, Apostolic
- Nunciature of the Holy See in Washington, D.C.
- Nuncio, Apostolic

== O ==
- Oceania, Catholic Church in (various articles)
- Occult Compensation
- Opus Dei
- Oratory of Saint Philip Neri
- Order, Catholic religious
- Ordination of women, Catholic Church doctrine on the
- L'Osservatore Romano
- Outline of Catholicism

== P ==
- Papal conclave
- Papal court
- Papal deposing power
- Papal documents (various articles) (see "Catholic Church" navigation box (below))
- Papal states
- Papal symbols and rituals (various articles) (see corresponding navigation box (below))
- Parish (Catholic Church)
- Pastor
- Patriarch
- Penance, Sacrament of
- Permanent Observer of the Holy See to the United Nations (in New York City)
- Permanent Observer of the Holy See to the United Nations in Geneva
- Politics of the Vatican City
- Pontiff
- Pontifical academy
- Pontifical Commission
- Pontifical Council
- Pontifical Council for the Laity
- Pontifical North American College
- Pope
- Pope Benedict XVI (various articles on his pontificate) (see "Catholic Church" navigation box (below))
- Pope Paul VI's reform of the Roman Curia
- Popes of the Catholic Church, articles on various (see corresponding navigation box (below))
- Prefect
- Prelate
- Priesthood (Catholic Church)
- Priest shortage
- Priests, List of Catholic
- Primacy of the Roman Pontiff
- Privilège du blanc
- Pro-cathedral
- Pro-life movement
- Puerto Rican Episcopal Conference
- Purgatory

== Q ==
- Quinquennial Visit Ad Limina

== R ==
- Religious (Catholicism)
- Religious institute (Catholic)
- Religious order
- Religious order rites
- Religious orders, articles on various Catholic (see "Catholic religious orders" navigation box (below))
- Resurrection of Jesus
- Right of Option
- Rite of Christian Initiation of Adults (RCIA)
- Rites of the Catholic Church (various articles) (see "Sacraments, Rites, and Liturgies of the Catholic Church" navigation box (below))
- Rites, Religious order
- Role of the Catholic Church in civilization
- Roman Catholic (term)
- Roman Catholic Church
- Catholic Church by country (various articles)
- Roman Catholic theology
- Roman Catholicism in Africa
- Roman Catholicism in Asia
- Roman Catholicism in Europe
- Roman Catholics by country
- Roman Curia
- Roman Curia, Pope Paul VI's reform of the
- Roman Curia, Pope John Paul II's reform of the
- Roman Rota, Tribunal of the
- Roman Inquisition
- Roman and Universal Inquisition, Supreme Sacred Congregation of the
- Rosary and scapular
- Royal veto of the appointment of bishops

== S ==
- Sacramentals
- Sacraments of the Catholic Church
- Sacraments of the Catholic Church (various articles) (see "Sacraments, Rites, and Liturgies of the Catholic Church" navigation box (below))
- Saint
- Second Lateran Council
- Secretariat of State (Vatican)
- Secular institute
- Seminary
- Separation of Church and State
- Signatura, Supreme Tribunal of the Apostolic
- Society of apostolic life
- South America, Catholic Church in (various articles)
- Squire Roses
- St. Peter's Basilica
- Stylites
- Suffragan bishop
- Suffragan diocese
- Supererogation
- Supreme Knight of the Knights of Columbus
- Supreme Tribunal of the Apostolic Signatura
- Swiss Guard

== T ==
- Ten Commandments, Catholic doctrine regarding the
- Territorial prelate
- Territories of Roman Catholic dioceses in India
- The Catholic University of America
- The Catholic University of America and The Knights of Columbus
- Theology of the Catholic Church (various articles) (see "Catholic Church" navigation box (below))
- Theology, History of Catholic (various articles) (see "History of Catholic theology" navigation box (below))
- Timeline of the Roman Catholic Church
- Titular bishop
- Traditionalist Catholic
- Trinity

== U ==
- United States Conference of Catholic Bishops
- Universal call to holiness

== V ==
- Vatican I
- Vatican II
- Vatican Apostolic Library
- Vatican Bank
- Vatican Basilica
- Vatican City, State of
- Vatican City in World War II
- Vatican City, politics of the
- Vatican City topics (various articles) (see corresponding navigation box (below))
- Vatican Constitution
- Vatican Diplomatic Corps
- Vatican Film Library
- Vatican flag
- Vatican guard
- Vatican Gardens
- Vatican Historical Museum
- Vatican Information Service
- Vatican Library
- Vatican Museums
- Vatican newspapers
- Vatican Observatory
- Vatican Publishing House
- Vatican Press Office
- Vatican Radio
- Vatican Secret Archives
- Vatican Secretary of State
- Vatican Television Center
- Venerable people (Roman Catholic), List of
- Vicar general
- Vimpa
- Visions of Jesus and Mary
- Vocational discernment in the Catholic Church

== W ==
- Women, Catholic Church doctrine on the ordination of
- World Youth Day

== Y ==
- Youth Day, World

== Z ==
- Zucchetto

== 1 ==
- 1917 Code of Canon Law
- 1983 Code of Canon Law

== See also ==
- Index of Eastern Christianity–related articles (including articles about Eastern Catholic Churches)
- Index of Vatican City–related articles
- Category:Anti-Catholicism
