= Catholic Directory =

Catholic Directories are various publications and reference works about or produced for the Catholic Church.

== Early history ==
The earliest English attempt at anything of the sort seems to have been a little Catholic Almanac, which appeared for three or four years in the reign of James II (see The Month, vol. CXI, 1908). This was a mere calendar of feasts.

The Irish Catholic Directory and Almanac seems to have existed under various names since 1837 or earlier. It was first called "A Complete Catholic Directory", and then, in 1846, "Battersby's Registry", from the name of the publisher. For Scotland, though the Scottish missions are included in the "Catholic Directory" published in London, there is also a separate "Catholic Directory for the Clergy and Laity of Scotland" which began under a slightly different name in 1868.

The earliest known publication of an Official Catholic Directory for England and Wales dates from 1848 and is still being published today by The Edit Partnership Ltd, on behalf of the Catholic Bishops' Conference of Englands & Wales.

Catholic Directories also exist for the Australian and Canadian provinces, and occasionally for separate local dioceses, e.g. the Diocese of Birmingham, England, possesses an "Official Diocesan Directory" of its own.

There were two Roman handbooks of a character somewhat analogous to Directories, which supplied names and details regarding the Catholic hierarchy throughout the world and especially regarding the cardinals, the Roman Congregations and their personnel, the prelates and camerieri, etc., in attendance upon the papal court. The first of these, called since 1872 La Gerarchia Cattolica e la Famiglia Pontificia, was first published in 1716 and was long familiarly known as Cracas from the name of the publisher. Officially, the early numbers were simply called "Notizie per l'Anno 1716, etc." (see Moroni, Dizionario, XX, 26 sqq.). The other work, similar in character but somewhat more ample in its information, appeared from 1898 under the title Annuario Ecclesiastico. The Directorium Chori, a work originally compiled by Guidetti in 1582, possessed a quasi-official character and was often reprinted. It was intended for the use of the hebdomadarius and cantors in collegiate churches, and is quite different in character from the works considered above.

== United States ==
=== Beginnings ===
Such publications began in the United States with an Ordo Divini Officii Recitandi, published at Baltimore, in 1801, by John Hayes. It had none of the directory or almanac features. The Catholic Laity's Directory to the Church Service with an Almanac for the year, an imitation of the English enterprise, was the next, in 1817. It was published in New York with the "permission of the Right Rev. Bishop Connolly" by Mathew Field, who was born in England of an Irish Catholic family and left there for New York in 1815. He died at Baltimore, 1832. His son, Joseph M. Field, was six years old when he arrived in New York, and became a prolific writer, dying at Mobile in 1856. Joseph's daughter, Kate Field, was later the well-known author and lecturer. Though both were baptized, neither was a professed Catholic.

This Field production, in addition to the ordinary almanac calendars, had a variety of pious and instructive reading-matter with an account of the churches, colleges, seminaries, and institutions of the United States. It made up a small 32mo book of sixty-eight pages. Among other things, it promised the preparation of a Catholic magazine which, however, was never started. Only one issue of this almanac was made. The next effort in the same direction, and on practically the same lines, was also at New York, in 1822, by W. H. Creagh. It was edited by the Rev. Dr. John Power, rector of St. Peter's church, and says in the preface that it was "intended to accompany the Missal with a view to facilitate the use of the same". The contents include "Brief Account of the Establishment of the Episcopacy in the United States"; "Present Status of religion in the respective Dioceses"; "A short account of the present State of the Society of Jesus in the U. S.", and obituaries of priests who had died from 1814 to 1821. This was the only number of this almanac.

=== Attempts at an annual publication ===
In 1834 Fielding Lucas of Baltimore took up the idea and brought out The Metropolitan Catholic Calendar and Laity's Directory for that year, to be published annually. He said in it that he had "intended to present it in 1832 but from circumstances over which he had no control it has been delayed to the present period". It prints a list of the hierarchy and the priests of the several dioceses, with their stations. In this publication and its various successors the title Directory is used in its purely secular meaning, as the issues include no ecclesiastical calendar or Ordo. James Meyers "at the Cathedral" is the publisher of the subsequent volumes until 1838, when Fielding Lucas, Jr., took hold and changed the name U. S. Catholic Almanac, that Meyers had given it, back to Metropolitan Catholic Almanac. In the issue of 1845 there is inserted a map of the United States, "prepared at much expense to exhibit at a glance the extent and relative situation of the different dioceses", with a table of comparative statistics, 1835 to 1845. A list of the clergy in England and Ireland was added in the volume for 1850. "Lucas Brothers" is the imprint on the almanac for 1856–57, and the Baltimore publication then ceased, to be taken up in 1858 by Edward Dunigan and Brother of New York, as Dunigan's American Catholic Almanac and List of the Clergy. All general reading-matter was omitted in this almanac, publication of which was stopped the following year when John Murphy and Co. of Baltimore resumed there the compilation of the Metropolitan Catholic Almanac.

Owing to the American Civil War no almanacs were printed during 1862 or 1863. In 1864 D. and J. Sadlier of New York started Sadlier's Catholic Directory, Almanac and Ordo, which John Gilmary Shea compiled and edited for them. It made a volume of more than 600 pages and gave lists of the clergy in the United States Canada, Great Britain, Ireland, and Australasia, with diocesan statistics. This publication continued alone in the field until 1886, when Hoffman Brothers, a German firm of publishers of Milwaukee, brought out Hoffman's Catholic Directory, which the Rev. James Fagan, a Milwaukee priest, compiled for them. In contents it was similar to the New York publication. This directory continued until 1896, when the Hoffman Company failed, and their plant was purchased by the Wiltzius Company, which has since continued the directory. The Sadlier Directory ceased publication in 1895.

=== Wiltzius publication ===
The Wiltzius Catholic Directory, Almanac and Clergy List has reports for all dioceses in the United States Canada, Alaska, Cuba, Sandwich Islands, Porto Rico, Philippine Islands, Newfoundland, England, Ireland, Scotland, and Wales, together with statistics of the Austro-Hungarian Monarchy, Belgium, Costa Rica, Guatemala, British Honduras, Nicaragua, San Salvador, German Empire, Japan, Luxemburg, The United States of Mexico, Netherlands, Norway, Oceanica, South Africa, The United States of Brazil, Curaçao, Dutch Guiana, Switzerland, and the West Indies. It contains also an alphabetical list of all clergymen in the United States and Canada, as well as a map of the ecclesiastical provinces in the United States. It gives a list of English-speaking confessors abroad, American colleges in Europe, and the leading Catholic societies; statistics of the Commission for the Catholic Missions among the Colored People and the Indians, and a list of Catholic papers and periodicals in the United States and Canada.

In the almanac for 1837 it is noted, concerning the statistics, that "the numbers marked with an asterisk are not given as strictly exact, though it is believed they approximate to the truth, and are as accurate as could be ascertained from the statements forwarded to the editor from the several dioceses". On the same topic Hoffman's Directory for 1890 says: "It is much to be regretted that the statistics are not more carefully kept. In every diocese there are parishes that fail to report and many dioceses report statistics only partially, so that any general summary that can be made up at best is only an approximation." Dealing with this long-standing and well-founded complaint of inaccurate Catholic statistics, the archbishops of the United States, at their annual conference in 1907, resolved to co-operate with the United States Census Bureau in an effort to collect correct figures. Archbishop Glennon of St. Louis was appointed a special census official by the Government for this purpose, and under his direction an enumeration of the Catholics of every parish in the United States was made. The figures thus obtained were used in the "Directory" for 1909. It is the first, therefore, of these publications giving statistics of population on which any reliance can be placed in respect to accuracy of detail.

== Canada ==
In 1886 Le Canada Ecclésiastique, Almanach Annuaire du clergé Canadien, printed in French. was begun in Montreal. The contents are similar to those of the directories in English. They have a number of illustrations of local and historical interest, such as a series of portraits of the Bishops of Quebec in the issue for 1908, in commemoration of the centenary celebrations. The Rev. Charles P. Beaubien edited the publication.

== See also ==
- Annuario Pontificio
- Catechism of the Catholic Church
- Catholic Church by country
- Catholic Church hierarchy
- Global organisation of the Catholic Church
- Glossary of the Catholic Church
- Historical list of the Catholic bishops of the United States
- Index of Catholic Church articles
- List of the Catholic dioceses of the United States
- Lists of patriarchs, archbishops, and bishops
- Outline of Catholicism
