= Thou shalt not steal =

One of the Ten Commandments (Exod. 20:15)

"Thou shalt not steal" (Biblical Hebrew: לֹא תִּגְנֹב, romanized: Lōʾ tiḡnōḇ) is one of the Ten Commandments of the Jewish Torah (known to Christians as the first five books of the Old Testament), which are widely understood as moral imperatives by legal scholars, Jewish scholars, Catholic scholars, and Post-Reformation scholars.

"Steal" in this commandment has traditionally been interpreted by Jewish commentaries to refer to the stealing of an actual human being, that is, to kidnap. With this understanding, a contextual translation of the commandment in Jewish tradition would more accurately be rendered as "Thou shalt not kidnap". Kidnapping would then constitute a capital offence and thus merit its inclusion among the Ten Commandments.

Nevertheless, this commandment has come to be interpreted, especially in non-Jewish traditions, as the unauthorized taking of private property (stealing or theft), which is a wrongful action already prohibited elsewhere in the Hebrew Bible that does not ordinarily incur the death penalty.

== Ancient usage ==
Significant voices of academic theologians (such as German Old Testament scholar A. Alt: Das Verbot des Diebstahls im Dekalog (1953)) suggest that commandment "you shall not steal" was originally intended against stealing people—against abductions and slavery, in agreement with the Talmudic interpretation of the statement as "you shall not kidnap" (Sanhedrin 86a).

The Hebrew word translated 'steal' is gneva. The Hebrew Bible contains a number of prohibitions of stealing and descriptions of negative consequences for this sin. The Genesis narrative describes Rachel as having stolen household goods from her father Laban when she fled from Laban's household with her husband Jacob and their children. Laban hotly pursued Jacob to recover his goods, and intended to do him harm, but Rachel hid the stolen items and avoided detection. Exodus 21:16 and Deuteronomy 24:7 apply the same Hebrew word to kidnapping (stealing a man) and demand the death penalty for such a sin.

The Hebrew word translated 'steal' is more commonly applied to material possessions. Restitution may be demanded, but there is no judicial penalty of death. However, a thief may be killed if caught in the act of breaking in at night under circumstances where the occupants may reasonably be in fear of greater harm. The ancient Hebrew understanding honored private property rights and demanded restitution even in cases that might have been accidental, such as livestock grazing in another man's field or vineyard (Exodus 22:1-9 (ESV)).

In the book of Leviticus, the prohibitions of robbing and stealing are repeated in the context of loving one's neighbor as oneself and the prohibition is expanded to include dealing falsely or fraudulently in matters of trade and negotiations. Wages owed to a hired worker are not to be withheld. Neighbors must not oppress or rob each other. Neighbors are to deal frankly with each other, protect the lives of each other, refrain from vengeance and grudges, and stand up for righteousness and justice in matters that go to court.

The law obliged the thief to pay seven times (if the thief steals because he is hungry). If the thief wasn't able to pay compensation for his theft by selling his things, he was sold as a slave.

If the thief confessed his sin, he was allowed to return the object, adding a fifth of its price and he brought to the priest as his compensation to the Lord a ram without blemish out of the flock, or its equivalent, for a guilt offering; and the priest made atonement for him before the Lord, and he was forgiven.

In Proverbs, the otherwise unknown Agur requests the Lord not make him poor or rich fearing poverty or greed might tempt him to theft. In Proverbs 9:16, the idea that stolen things are sweet and the bread (food) eaten in secret is pleasant is rebuked as foolish. Even to be partner to a thief is described as to hate one's own life – to know of wrongdoing but be unable to testify to it. Likewise in Romans, rulers such as those of Sodom and Gomorrah who lust after bribes are described as detestable, corrupting their entire state.

The book of Proverbs contrasts the response of a victim to a thief who steals to satisfy his hunger with the response of a jealous husband to adultery. The thief is not despised by his victim, even though the thief must make restitution even if it costs him all the goods of his house. In contrast, the jealous husband will accept no compensation and will repay the adulterer with wounds and dishonor, not sparing when his fury takes revenge. The book of Zechariah describes God as cursing the home of the thief and the home of those who swear falsely and Jeremiah describes thieves as being shamed when they are caught.

== Jewish doctrine ==
Jewish law enumerates 613 Mitzvot or commandments, including prohibition of stealing and a number of other commandments related to the protection of private property and administration of justice in related cases.

467. Not to steal money stealthily (Leviticus 19:11)

468. The court must implement punitive measures against the thief (Exodus 21:37)
469. Each individual must ensure that his scales and weights are accurate (Leviticus 19:36)
470. Not to commit injustice with scales and weights (Leviticus 19:35)
471. Not to possess inaccurate scales and weights even if they are not for use (Deuteronomy 25:13)
472. Not to move a boundary marker to steal someone's property (Deuteronomy 19:14)
473. Not to kidnap (Exodus 20:13)
474. Not to rob openly (Leviticus 19:13)
475. Not to withhold wages or fail to repay a debt (Leviticus 19:13)
476. Not to covet and scheme to acquire another's possession (Exodus 20:14)
477. Not to desire another's possession (Deuteronomy 5:18)
478. Return the robbed object or its value (Leviticus 5:23)
479. Not to ignore a lost object (Deuteronomy 22:3)
480. Return the lost object (Deuteronomy 22:1)

481. The court must implement laws against the one who assaults another or damages another's property (Exodus 21:8)

— Sefer Hamitzvot by Maimonides

Maimonides (the Rambam) viewed stealing as one step in the progression from covetous desire to murder. When the person who owns a coveted item resists its unjust acquisition, the thief resorts to violence and may become guilty of murder.

Desire leads to coveting, and coveting leads to stealing. For if the owner (of the coveted object) does not wish to sell, even though he is offered a good price and is entreated to accept, the person (who covets the object) will come to steal it, as it is written (Mikha 2:2) [Micah 2:2], 'They covet fields and (then) steal them.' And if the owner approaches him with a view to reclaiming his money or preventing the theft, then he will come to murder. Go and learn from the example of Achav [Ahab] and Navot [Naboth].

— Maimonides

Maimonides’ admonition to learn from the example of Ahab and Naboth refers to the narrative in 1 Kings 21 in which King Ahab of Israel tried to convince Naboth the Jezreelite to sell him the vineyard Naboth owned adjacent to the king's palace. Ahab wanted the land to use as a vegetable garden, but Naboth refused to sell or trade the property to Ahab saying, “The LORD forbid that I should give up to you what I have inherited from my fathers!” Ahab's wife Jezebel then conspired to obtain the vineyard by writing letters in Ahab's name to the elders and nobles in Naboth's town instructing them to have two scoundrels bear false witness claiming that Naboth has cursed both God and the king. After Naboth was subsequently stoned to death, Ahab seized possession of Naboth's vineyard. The text describes the LORD as very angry with Ahab, and the prophet Elijah pronounces judgment on both Ahab and Jezebel.

== New Testament doctrine ==
The New Testament repeats the commandment not to steal, contains dire warnings about spiritual consequences of the practice, and upholds the basic ideas of private property rights and the proper role of governmental authorities in punishing thieves. Thieves are exhorted to steal no longer, but to work hard with their own hands so that they might have something to share with people in need. Aquinas identifies five types of theft: by stealth, by violence, in withholding wages, fraud, and by buying positions of preferment.

The hypocritical thief is personified by Judas, who took secretly his part from the money Jesus and the apostles raised for helping the poor; he objected when Mary anointed Jesus with pure nard, pretending hypocritically it would have been useful if the nard would have been sold and the money given to the poor. There were some Pharisees like Judas: they stole, although preaching not to steal.

While private property rights are affirmed, the overriding theme in the New Testament is that one should trust and hope in God rather than in one's material possessions, and there is an acknowledgement of a struggle in the heart between loving God and loving money. It is said that "the love of money is a root of all kinds of evils" (1 Timothy 6:6-10). And also:

Do not lay up for yourselves treasures on earth, where moth and rust destroy and where thieves break in and steal, but lay up for yourselves treasures in heaven, where neither moth nor rust destroys and where thieves do not break in and steal. For where your treasure is, there your heart will be also. ... No one can serve two masters, for either he will hate the one and love the other, or he will be devoted to the one and despise the other. You cannot serve God and money.

— Matthew 6:19-24

The book of 1 Corinthians asserts that thieves, swindlers, and the greedy will be excluded from the kingdom of God as sure as adulterers, idolaters, and the sexual immoral, but that those who leave these sins behind can be sanctified and justified in the name of the Lord Jesus (1 Corinthians 6:9-11).

The command against stealing is seen as a natural consequence of the command to “love your neighbor as yourself.” The prohibition against desiring forbidden things is also seen as a moral imperative for the individual to exercise control over the thoughts of his mind and the desires of his heart.

Thomas Aquinas points out that just as "Thou shalt not kill" forbids one to injure his neighbor in his own person; and "Thou shalt not commit adultery" forbids injury to the person to whom one is bound in marriage; the Commandment, "Thou shalt not steal," forbids one to injure his neighbor in his goods.

== Catholic doctrine ==
Catholic teaching regards the commandment “You shall not steal” as an expression of the commandment to love your neighbor as yourself. The Catechism of the Catholic Church states:

The seventh commandment forbids unjustly taking or keeping the goods of one's neighbor and wronging him in any way with respect to his goods. It commands justice and charity in the care of earthly goods and the fruits of men's labor. For the sake of the common good, it requires respect for the universal destination of goods and respect for the right to private property.

— Catechism of the Catholic Church

Catholic teaching states that in economic matters, respect for human dignity requires practicing temperance, a virtue that moderates attachment to worldly goods; justice, a virtue that preserves our neighbors rights and renders what is due; and solidarity, in accordance with the Golden Rule. Even if it does not contradict explicit provisions of civil law, any form of unjustly taking and keeping the property of others is against the seventh commandment: thus, deliberate retention of goods lent or of objects lost; business fraud; paying unjust wages; forcing up prices by taking advantage of the ignorance or hardship of another. The following are also considered morally illicit: speculation by which one contrives to manipulate the price of goods artificially in order to gain an advantage to the detriment of others; corruption in which one influences the judgment of those who must make decisions according to law; appropriation and use for private purposes of the common goods of an enterprise; work poorly done; tax evasion; forgery of checks and invoices; excessive expenses and waste. Willfully damaging private or public property is contrary to the moral law and requires reparation. In addition, Catholic teaching demands that contracts and promises be strictly observed. Injustices require restitution to the owner.

Following Thomas Aquinas, Catholic teaching holds that "if the need be so manifest and urgent, that it is evident that the present need must be remedied by whatever means be at hand (for instance when a person is in some imminent danger, and there is no other possible remedy), then it is lawful for a man to succor his own need by means of another's property, by taking it either openly or secretly: nor is this properly speaking theft or robbery". Catholic teaching also supports the doctrine of occult compensation.

Catholic teaching reminds that Jesus enjoins his disciples to prefer him to everything and everyone, and bids them "renounce all that [they have]" for his sake and that of the Gospel. Jesus gave his disciples the example of the poor widow of Jerusalem who gave out of her poverty all that she had to live on. Detachment from riches is portrayed as obligatory for entrance into the Kingdom of heaven. "Blessed are the poor in spirit" represents the expectation that those who do not receive all their physical longings are more inclined to seek fulfillment of their spiritual longings through Jesus Christ. “The Lord grieves over the rich, because they find their consolation in the abundance of goods.” "I want to see God" expresses the true desire of man. The water of eternal life quenches the thirst for God. Attachment to the goods of this world are a bondage. The Scriptural remedy is the desire for true happiness that is found in seeking and finding God. Holy people must struggle, with grace from on high, to obtain the good things God promises. Faithful Christians put to death their cravings and, with the grace of God, prevail over the seductions of pleasure and power. For what does it profit a man to gain the whole world, yet lose his own soul?

== Reformation and post-reformation doctrines ==
Martin Luther ascribes this commandment to God's desire to protect private property rights. He views this commandment as prohibiting not only the taking of another's property, but all unjust and fraudulent dealing in the marketplace, workplace, or any other place where transactions are conducted. Luther further describes negligence and dereliction of duty as violations of this commandment if such negligence causes one's employer to suffer loss. Likewise, laziness and unfaithfulness in one's paid employment are viewed as a fraud that is worse than the petty thefts that can be prevented with locks and bolts.

Furthermore, in the market and in common trade likewise, this practice is in full swing and force to the greatest extent, where one openly defrauds another with bad merchandise, false measures, weights, coins, and by nimbleness and queer finances or dexterous tricks takes advantage of him; likewise, when one overcharges a person in a trade and wantonly drives a hard bargain, skins and distresses him. ... Therefore they are also called swivel-chair robbers, land- and highway-robbers, not pick-locks and sneak-thieves who snatch away the ready cash, but who sit on the chair [at home] and are styled great noblemen, and honorable, pious citizens, and yet rob and steal under a good pretext.

— Martin Luther, The Large Catechism

Martin Luther taught that it is each person's duty, at the risk of God's displeasure, not only to do no injury to his neighbor, nor to deprive him of gain, nor to perpetrate any act of unfaithfulness or malice in any bargain or trade, but faithfully to preserve his property for him, to secure and promote his advantage, especially when one accepts money, wages, and one's livelihood for such service. Those who trespass this commandment may escape the hangman, but he shall not escape the wrath and punishment of God. Luther held that it must be impressed upon the young that they be careful not to follow the old lawless crowd, but keep their eyes fixed upon God's commandment, “lest His wrath and punishment come upon them too.”

John Calvin explains that since injustice is an abomination to God, the intent of the commandment against stealing is that one must render to every man his due. This commandment forbids us to long after other men's goods. Calvin holds that each individual's possessions have not fallen to him by chance, but by the distribution of the sovereign Lord of all. Therefore, no one can pervert his means to bad purposes without committing a fraud on a divine dispensation. Calvin asserts that God sees the long train of deception by which the man of craft begins to lay nets for his more simple neighbor. For Calvin, violations of this commandment are not confined to money, or merchandise, or lands, but extend to every kind of right. We defraud our neighbors to their hurt if we decline any of the duties which we are bound to perform towards them. God's wrath is incurred if an agent or an indolent steward wastes the substance of his employer, or does not give due heed to the management of his property; if he unjustly squanders or luxuriously wastes the means entrusted to him; if a servant holds his master in derision, divulges his secrets, or in any way is treacherous to his life or his goods. Likewise, a master incurs God's wrath if he cruelly torments his household, because he is guilty of theft before God; along with all who fail to deliver what he owes to others, keeps back, or makes away with what does not belong to him.

Calvin further teaches that obedience requires us to be contented with our own lot. We should desire to acquire nothing but honest and lawful gain. We should not endeavor to grow rich by injustice, nor to plunder our neighbor of his goods, that our own may thereby be increased. We must not heap up wealth cruelly wrung from the blood of others. It should be our constant aim faithfully to lend our counsel and aid to all so as to assist them in retaining their property; or if we have to do with the perfidious or crafty, let us rather be prepared to yield somewhat of our right than to contend with them. Calvin further asserted that the individual Christian should contribute to the relief of those observed under the pressure of difficulties, assisting their want out of one's own abundance. Calvin describes the commandment against stealing as requiring the unwavering delivery of any and all obligations:

Let every one, I say, thus consider what in his own place and order he owes to his neighbours, and pay what he owes. Moreover, we must always have a reference to the Lawgiver, and so remember that the law requiring us to promote and defend the interest and convenience of our fellow-men, applies equally to our minds and our hands.

— John Calvin

Matthew Henry sees the prohibition on stealing as applying to the unjust taking, sinful spending, and sinful sparing. One must not take another's goods or encroach upon the boundaries of his property. One must restore what is lost. One must pay what is owed: debts, rents, wages, taxes, and tithes.

This command forbids us to rob ourselves of what we have by sinful spending, or of the use and comfort of it by sinful sparing, and to rob others by removing the ancient landmarks, invading our neighbour’s rights, taking his goods from his person, or house, or field, forcibly or clandestinely, over-reaching in bargains, nor restoring what is borrowed or found, withholding just debts, rents, or wages, and (which is worst of all) to rob the public in the coin or revenue, or that which is dedicated to the service of religion.

— Matthew Henry

== See also ==
- Seven Laws of Noah
- You shall not murder
- Ten Commandments
