= Joseph Ratzinger as Prefect of the Congregation for the Doctrine of the Faith =

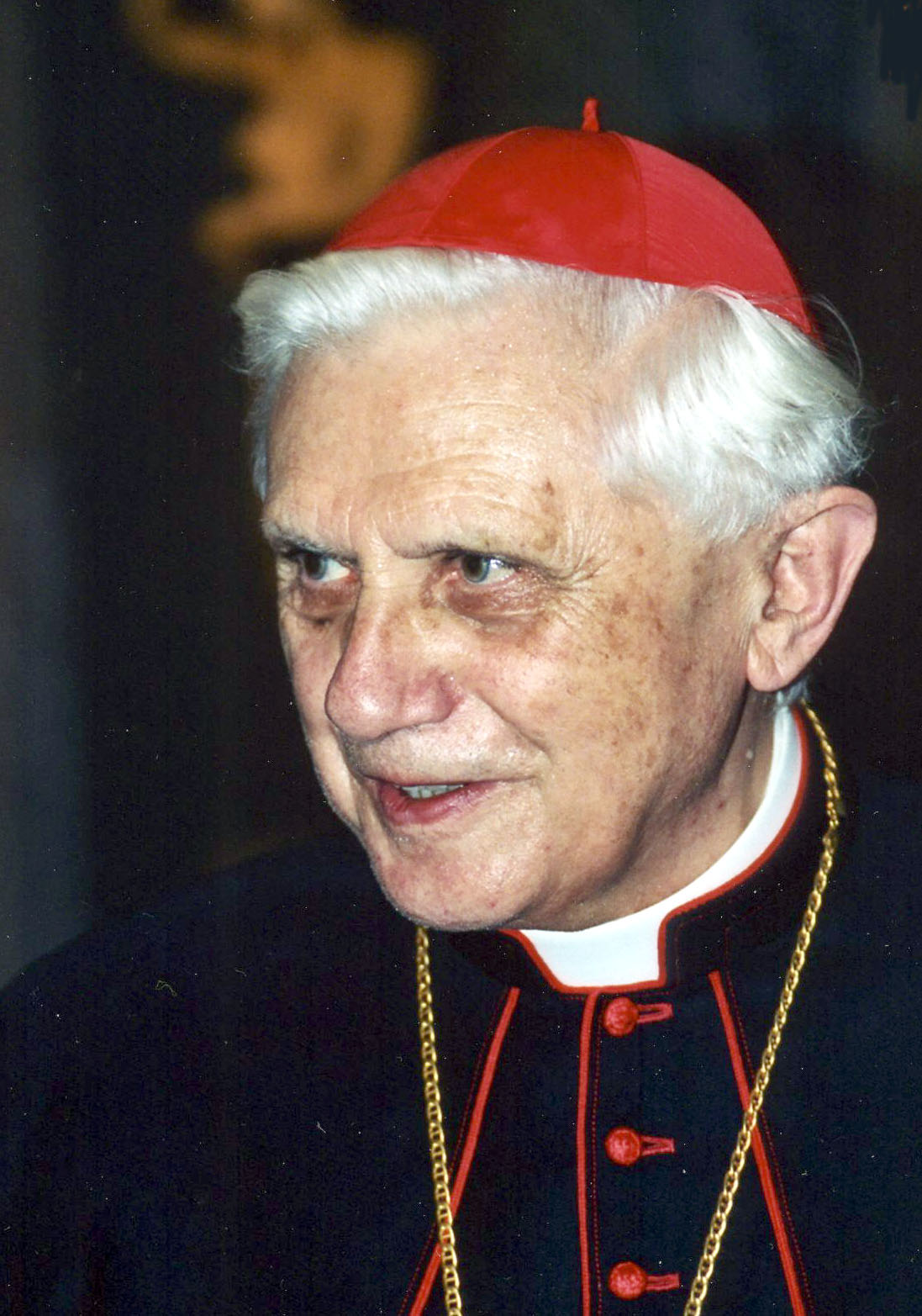
Cardinal Joseph Ratzinger in 2001

Joseph Ratzinger (1927–2022) was named by Pope John Paul II on 25 November 1981 as prefect of the Congregation for the Doctrine of the Faith (CDF) formerly known as the Holy Office and, especially around the 16th century, as the Roman Inquisition.

He previously became both Archbishop of Munich and Freising and a cardinal in 1977. He resigned as archbishop in early 1982, in light of his new duties as prefect.

While continuing to be prefect, Ratzinger was promoted within the College of Cardinals to become cardinal bishop of Velletri-Segni in 1993, and became the college's vice-dean in 1998 and dean (senior cardinal) in 2002. He was elected Pope Benedict XVI in 2005, becoming pope emeritus on his retirement in 2013.

== Role in the 1980s ==
In office, Cardinal Ratzinger fulfilled his institutional role, defending and reaffirming official Catholic doctrine, including teaching on topics such as birth control, homosexuality, and inter-religious dialogue. During his period in office, the Congregation for the Doctrine of the Faith took disciplinary measures against some outspoken liberation theologians in Latin America in the 1980s and Jesuit priest Anthony de Mello. In 1983, he issued the Declaration on Masonic Associations which drew on Declaration Concerning Status of Catholics Becoming Freemasons (itself issued by the Congregation nine months before his becoming its prefect). The Congregation condemned liberation theology twice (in 1984 and 1986), accusing it of Marxist tendencies and of inciting hate and violence. Leonardo Boff, for example, was suspended, while others were reputedly reduced to silence. Cardinal Ratzinger also upheld the teaching against the ordination of women and stated that it belonged to the deposit of the faith, meaning that it was beyond the jurisdiction of any pope to change it.

From 1986 to 1992 he presided over the drafting committee that wrote the Catechism of the Catholic Church, along with José Manuel Estepa Llaurens, William Joseph Levada and Estanislao Esteban Karlic with Christoph Schönborn, O.P. serving as the secretary of the group.

== Archives of the Holy Office ==
Many saw in a contrasting light Ratzinger's planning and overseeing of the opening of the long-sealed Inquisition archives, making available at the beginning of 1998 all materials up to the 1903 death of Pope Leo XIII. However, the lag behind availability of other Vatican archives (at that point open up to the 1922 death of Pope Benedict XV and, since Ratzinger became Pope himself, up to the 1939 death of Pope Pius XI), has led to some criticism; it is still unclear what the Vatican's plan for future accessibility to post-1903 Holy Office archives is, nothing having been said since 1998 regarding whether and when they will be made available to scholars.

== Dominus Iesus ==
In 2000, the Congregation for the Doctrine of the Faith published a document entitled Dominus Iesus, which reaffirmed the historic doctrine and mission of the Church to proclaim the Gospel.

The document, in paragraph 4, pointed out the danger to the Church of "relativistic theories which seek to justify religious pluralism" by denying that God has revealed truth to humanity.

Paragraph 22, addressing the question that one religion is as good as another (syncretism or indifferentism), states, "followers of other religions can receive divine grace, it is also certain that objectively speaking they are in a gravely deficient situation in comparison with those who, in the Church, have the fullness of the means of salvation. The deliberate omission of the filioque clause ("and the Son"), an article of Catholic Faith, in the first paragraph is seen by some as an outreach to the Greek Orthodox Church which has been in conflict with the Latin Catholic Church over its addition to the Nicene Creed for about one thousand years, although the Filioque clause confirms the inherent ordered nature of The Blessed Trinity,

== Abortion in reunified Germany ==
After the German reunification the united German government decided to merge the abortion laws. It would be legal within the first twelve weeks of pregnancy but only after the woman received counseling on her decision. If she still decided to proceed she would have to present a certificate saying she had completed the counseling sessions. The German Bishops' Conference established counseling centres that saw 20,000 women. After being counseled, roughly 5,000 decided not to have the abortion. In 1997 Pope John Paul II ordered the German bishops to withdraw the counseling support. Cardinal Ratzinger, as prefect of the Congregation for the Faith, was given the task of carrying out John Paul's instructions. In 1999 the German bishops unanimously rejected the demands of the CDF. Only in 2000 did the bishops conference end the counseling service.

== Lutheran Dialogue ==
His most significant ecumenical achievement as CDF Prefect was the Joint Declaration on the Doctrine of Justification signed with the Lutheran World Federation in 1999. Bishop George Anderson, head of the Evangelical Lutheran Church of America, publicly acknowledged that it was Ratzinger who "untied the knots" when it looked as though the document would be "shipwrecked" by officials from the Pontifical Council for Promoting Christian Unity. Cardinal Ratzinger got the agreement back on track by organising a meeting with the Lutheran leaders at his brother's house in Regensburg. Included in this agreement was the notion that the goal of the ecumenical process is unity in diversity, not structural reintegration.

== Ratzinger and Fatima ==
Until her death, Lúcia dos Santos, the last surviving of the three Fatima visionaries, was forbidden to discuss the Fatima revelations publicly unless given leave by Cardinal Ratzinger. He was one of seven people known to have read the actual Third Message put into writing in 1944, and is the author of the Theological Commentary on the Third Message, published with the message itself in 2000.

In 1984, an interview with Ratzinger was published in the Pauline Sisters newsletter which stated that the message deals with "dangers threatening the faith and the life of the Christian and therefore of the world", while stating that it marks the beginning of the end-times. A year later, the interview was re-published in The Ratzinger Report, although several statements were omitted.

In October 1987 he stated that "the things contained in [the] Third Secret correspond to what has been announced in Scripture and has been said again and again in many other Marian apparitions; first of all, that of Fatima in what is already known of what its message contains, conversion and penitence are the essential conditions for salvation".

In 1997, Ratzinger and Capovilla publicly denied a rumor that the Third Message was being withheld for fears it would condemn the changes of the Vatican II council.

On June 26, 2000, following the release of the text of the prophecy, Ratzinger issued a statement that the third and final chapter of Mary's prophecy had been fulfilled in 1981 in a failed attempt on Pope John Paul's life. He was quoted in the media as stating, "No great mystery is revealed; nor is the future unveiled. A careful reading of the text will probably prove disappointing."

== Response to sex abuse scandal ==
As Cardinal Ratzinger was Prefect of the Congregation for the Doctrine of the Faith (CDF), the sexual abuse of minors by priests was his responsibility to investigate from 2001, when that charge was given to the CDF by Pope John Paul II. Before given this charge, Cardinal Ratzinger was theoretically privy to all sexual abuse cases within the Church. As Prefect of the CDF, Canon Law directed Bishops to report sexual abuse cases involving priests in their diocese to Cardinal Ratzinger. However, due to the obscurity of canon Law, even within the Church, it is unknown whether this directive was actually followed.

As part of the implementation of the norms enacted and promulgated on April 30, 2001 by Pope John Paul II, on May 18, 2001 Ratzinger sent a letter to every bishop in the Catholic Church. This letter reminded them of the strict penalties facing those who revealed confidential details concerning enquiries into allegations against priests of certain grave ecclesiastical crimes, including sexual abuse, which were reserved to the jurisdiction of the Congregation. The letter extended the prescription or statute of limitations for these crimes to ten years. However, when the crime is sexual abuse of a minor, the "prescription begins to run from the day on that which the minor completes the eighteenth year of age." Lawyers acting for two alleged victims of abuse in Texas claim that by sending the letter the cardinal conspired to obstruct justice. The Catholic News Service reported that "the letter said the new norms reflected the CDF's traditional "exclusive competence" regarding delicta graviora—Latin for "graver offenses". According to canon law experts in Rome, reserving cases of clerical sexual abuse of minors to the CDF is something new. In past eras, some serious crimes by priests against sexual morality, including pedophilia, were handled by that congregation or its predecessor, the Holy Office, but this has not been true in recent years." The promulgation of the norms by Pope John Paul II and the subsequent letter by the then Prefect of the CDF were published in 2001 in Acta Apostolicae Sedis which is the Holy See's official gazette, in accordance with the 1983 Code of Canon Law, and is disseminated monthly to thousands of libraries and offices around the world.

In 2002 Ratzinger told the Catholic News Service that "less than one percent of priests are guilty of acts of this type." Opponents saw this as ignoring the crimes of those who committed the abuse; others saw it as merely pointing out that this should not taint other priests who live respectable lives. Shortly after his election, he told Cardinal Francis George, the Archbishop of Chicago, that he would attend to the matter.'

According to the Cardinal Archbishop of Vienna Christoph Schönborn, speaking on Austrian television in March 2010, Ratzinger in 1995 pressed Pope John Paul II to mount a special investigation against Hans Hermann Groër, Schönborn's predecessor as Archbishop, after Groër was accused of molesting young monks. But other Curia officials persuaded John Paul that the media had exaggerated the case, and an inquiry would only create more bad publicity.

== Attempted retirement ==
In July 2007 Pope Benedict XVI (Ratzinger) visited the Vatican Secret Archives, and said that upon

"reaching the age of 70 [in April 1997], I very much hoped that the beloved John Paul II would have allowed me to devote myself to the study of interesting documents and manuscripts which you preserve with such care, true masterpieces which help us study the history of humanity and Christianity. In His providential designs the Lord had other plans for me and now I’m here among you not as a keen student of ancient texts, but as a shepherd called on to encourage all believers to cooperate for the salvation of the world, each carrying out the mission God has assigned to him".

In August 2010 Raffaele Cardinal Farina, archivist and librarian of the Holy Roman Church, said that Pope John Paul II declined then-Cardinal Ratzinger's request to spend his last years at the Vatican Archives. Cardinal Farina recalled when he was appointed prefect of the Vatican Library in May 1997 having a brief meeting with Cardinal Ratzinger in which he was asked his opinion of Ratzinger joining the team. Ratzinger asked the Pope if he could step down from his role when he turned 70 on 16 April 1997. "He was asking me what I thought of his idea and what being archivist and librarian of the Holy Roman Church involved", said Farina.

=== Resignation of Benedict XVI ===
On February 11, 2013, it was announced that Pope Benedict XVI would resign as pope of the Catholic Church on February 28, at 8 pm Rome time (7pm GMT). The 85-year-old Pontiff said his strength was 'no longer adequate to continue in office due to his advanced age'. He also said: 'I have had to recognize my incapacity to adequately fulfill the ministry entrusted to me', and that he was making the decision in 'full freedom' but was 'fully aware of the gravity of this gesture'.

== See also ==
- Theology of Pope Benedict XVI
