= History of the Catholic Church (1962–present) =

The post–Vatican II history of the Catholic Church is the recent history of the Catholic Church since the Second Vatican Council (1962–1965).

== Background ==
In the aftermath of World War II, religious existence came under fire from communist governments in Eastern Europe and China. Although some priests have since been exposed as collaborators, both the Church's official resistance and the leadership of Pope John Paul II are credited with helping to bring about the downfall of communist governments across Europe in 1991.

The Church policies after World War II under Pope Pius XII focused on material aid to war-torn Europe, an internal internationalization of the Roman Catholic Church and the development of its worldwide diplomatic relations. His encyclicals, Evangelii praecones and Fidei donum, issued on June 2, 1951, and April 21, 1957, respectively, increased the local decision-making of Catholic missions, many of which became independent dioceses. Pius XII demanded recognition of local cultures as fully equal to European culture. In 1957, the Chinese Patriotic Catholic Association was established.

Pius XII invoked ex cathedra papal infallibility by defining the dogma of the Assumption of Mary, as proclaimed in the Apostolic constitution Munificentissimus Deus. His forty-one encyclicals include Mystici corporis, on the Church as the Body of Christ; Mediator Dei on liturgy reform; Humani generis on the Church's position on theology and evolution. He eliminated the Italian majority in the College of Cardinals with the consistory of 1946.

Pius XII was succeeded by John XXIII.

== Vatican II ==
=== Sessions ===
Two-thousand nine-hundred and eight (2,908) men (referred to as Council Fathers) were entitled to seats at the council. These included all bishops from around the world, as well as many superiors of male religious institutes. 2,540 took part in the opening session, making it the largest gathering in any council in church history. (This compares to Vatican I where 737 attended, mostly from Europe.) Attendance varied in later sessions from 2,100 to over 2,300. In addition, a varying number of periti (Latin for "experts") were available for theological consultation—a group that turned out to have a major influence as the council went forward. Seventeen Orthodox Churches and Protestant denominations sent observers. More than three dozen representatives of other Christian communities were present at the opening session, and the number grew to nearly 100 by the end of the 4th Council Session.

The Catholic Church engaged in a comprehensive process of reform following the Second Vatican Council (1962–1965). Intended as a continuation of Vatican I, under Pope John XXIII the council developed into an engine of modernisation. It was tasked with making the historical teachings of the Church clear to a modern world, and made pronouncements on topics including the nature of the church, the mission of the laity and religious freedom. The council asked for a revision of the liturgy and permitted the Latin liturgical rites to use vernacular languages as well as Latin during mass and other sacraments. Efforts by the Church to improve Christian unity became a priority. In addition to finding common ground on certain issues with Protestant churches, the Catholic Church has discussed the possibility of unity with the Eastern Orthodox Church.

== Post–Vatican II history ==
=== Liturgy reforms ===
Changes to old rites, ceremonies and church architecture following Vatican II stunned many Catholics, who spoke of it as Wreckovation. Some stopped going to church, while others tried to preserve the old liturgy with the help of sympathetic priests. The latter formed the basis of today's Traditionalist Catholic groups, which believe that the reforms of Vatican II have gone too far in departing from traditional church norms, particularly with regard to changes made to the Mass. Liberal Catholics form another dissenting group.

Liberal Catholics typically take a less literal view of the Bible and of divine revelation, and sometimes disagree with official Church views on social and political issues. The most famous liberal theologian of recent times has been Hans Küng, whose unorthodox views of the incarnation, and his denials of infallibility led to Church withdrawal of his authorization to teach as a Catholic in 1979. In his book A Concise History of the Catholic Church, professor Thomas Bokenkotter commented on the situation by stating "Most Catholics, however, accepted the changes more or less gracefully but with little enthusiasm and have learned to take in stride the continuing series of changes that have modified not only the Mass but the other sacraments as well." In 2007, with his apostolic letter Summorum Pontificum, Benedict XVI reinstated the Tridentine Mass as an option, to be celebrated upon request by the faithful.

In 2021, Pope Francis published Traditionis custodes, instating limitations on the Tridentine Mass.

=== Liberation theology ===
In the 1960s, growing social awareness and politicization in the Latin American Church gave birth to liberation theology. It re-interpreted the Gospel in radical ways that redefined the Church's mission. Peruvian priest, Gustavo Gutiérrez, became one of the movement's better-known scholars. A meeting of Latin American bishops in 1968, charged with the implementation of Vatican II, led to the new movement growing increasingly influential. In 1979, the subsequent bishops' conference in Mexico officially declared the Latin American Church's "preferential option for the poor". Salvadoran Archbishop Óscar Romero became the region's most famous contemporary martyr in 1980, when he was murdered while saying mass by forces allied with the government. Pope John Paul II and Pope Benedict XVI have denounced the movement as dangerous and "a fundamental threat to the faith of the church" because, as Edward Norman explains, the Church considers it an attempt to establish a Christian society "through the coercive machinery of political management". The Brazilian theologian Leonardo Boff was twice ordered to cease publishing and teaching. While Pope John Paul II was criticized for his severity in dealing with proponents of the movement, he maintained that the Church, in its efforts to champion the poor, should not do so by resorting to violence or partisan politics. The movement is still alive in Latin America today, though the Church now faces the challenge of Pentecostal revival in much of the region.

=== Humanae Vitae ===
The sexual revolution of the 1960s brought challenging issues for the Church. Pope Paul VI's 1968 encyclical Humanae Vitae affirmed the sanctity of life from conception to natural death and rejected the use of contraception; both abortion and euthanasia were considered to be murder. The Church's rejection of the use of condoms has provoked criticism, especially with respect to countries where AIDS and HIV have attained epidemic proportions. The Church maintains that countries like Kenya, where behavioral changes are endorsed instead of condom use, have experienced greater progress towards controlling the disease than countries solely promoting condoms.

=== Role of women ===
Efforts in support of the Catholic ordination of women led to a ruling against it in 1976 by the Sacred Congregation for the Doctrine of the Faith (Declaration on the Question of the Admission of Women to the Ministerial Priesthood). Pope John Paul II later issued two documents to explain Church teaching. Mulieris Dignitatem was issued in 1988 to clarify women's equally important and complementary role in the work of the Church. Then in 1994, Ordinatio Sacerdotalis explained that the Church only extends ordination to men in order to follow the example of Jesus, who chose only men for this specific duty. The group Roman Catholic Womenpriests began performing ordination ceremonies for women in 2002, the validity of which is nonexistent, as the Church has issued orders of excommunication for any and all participants, invalidating any Sacraments issued by them.

=== Capital punishment ===
John Paul II then set the Church in opposition to capital punishment when he issued Evangelium Vitae in 1995, explaining that execution was appropriate when it was the only way to defend society, the pope noted that the modern penal system made this option rare or nonexistent.

On 2 August 2018, it was announced that the Catechism of the Catholic Church would be revised to state that the Church teaches that "the death penalty is inadmissible because it is an attack on the inviolability and dignity of the person". A full letter to the bishops regarding the change stated that it was consistent with the previous teachings of the Catholic Church regarding the dignity of human life, and that it reflected how modern society had better prison systems with a goal of criminal rehabilitation that made the death penalty unnecessary for the protection of innocent people. Within two weeks, 45 Catholic scholars and clergy signed an appeal to the cardinals of the Catholic Church, calling on them to advise Pope Francis to retract the recent revision made to the Catechism, on the grounds that its appearance of contradicting scripture and traditional teaching is causing scandal.

=== US sex abuse cases ===
Mainly in the United States, several major lawsuits emerged in 2001 claiming that priests had sexually abused minors. Some priests resigned, others were defrocked and jailed and financial settlements were agreed to with many victims. In the US, where the vast majority of sex abuse cases occurred, the United States Conference of Catholic Bishops commissioned a comprehensive study that found that four percent of all priests who served in the US from 1950 to 2002 faced some sort of sexual accusation. Further, the Church was widely criticized when it emerged that some bishops had known about abuse allegations, and reassigned many of the accused after first sending them to psychiatric counseling, instead of removing them. Some bishops and psychiatrists contended that the prevailing psychology of the times suggested that people could be cured of such behavior through counseling. Pope John Paul II responded by declaring that "there is no place in the priesthood and religious life for those who would harm the young". The US Church instituted reforms to prevent future abuse by requiring background checks for Church employees; and, because the vast majority of victims were teenage boys, the worldwide Church also prohibited the ordination of men with "deep–seated homosexual tendencies". It now requires dioceses faced with an allegation to alert the authorities, conduct an investigation and remove the accused from duty. In 2008, Cardinal Cláudio Hummes, head of the Vatican Congregation for the Clergy, affirmed that the scandal was an "exceptionally serious" problem, but estimated that it was "probably caused by 'no more than 1 per cent'" of the over 400,000 Catholic priests worldwide. Some commentators, such as journalist Jon Dougherty, have argued that media coverage of the issue has been excessive, given that the same problems plague other institutions such as the US public school system with much greater frequency.

=== Benedict XVI ===
In 2007, Benedict XVI reverted the decision of his predecessor regarding the conduct of papal elections by the changing the §75 of Universi Dominici gregis. The same year, he approved the beatification of 498 Spanish Martyrs. His first encyclical Deus caritas est discussed the nature of love and how it informs one's participation in a just society. In an address at the university of Regensburg, Germany, Benedict maintained that in the Western world, to a large degree, only positivistic reason and philosophy are valid. Yet the world's profoundly religious cultures see this exclusion of the divine, as an attack on their most profound convictions. A concept of reason which excludes the divine, is incapable of entering into the dialogue of cultures, according to Benedict. After the Pope explained his quote, the dialogue continued, with cordial meetings of Islam representatives in Turkey, and the ambassadors of Muslim countries in 2007. A May 2008 declaration agreed on between Benedict and Muslims, led by Mahdi Mostafavi, stressed that religion is essentially non-violent and that violence can be justified neither by reason nor by faith. He spoke strongly against drug dealers in Latin America and Catholic politicians supporting abortion laws.

==== Ethical rulings ====
In 2007, the Congregation for the Doctrine of the Faith clarified the Catholic Church's position vis-a-vis other Christian communities. Quoting the statement of Pope Paul VI: "What the Church has taught down through the centuries, we also teach: that there is only one Church", the Vatican insisted that while communities separated from the Catholic Church can be instruments of salvation, only those with apostolic succession can be properly termed "churches". Some Protestant representatives were not surprised; others announced themselves insulted by the document, which also stressed the Church's commitment to ecumenical dialogue. A Church official told Vatican radio that any dialogue is facilitated when parties are clear about their identity. Important ethical decisions during the pontificate of Benedict XVI involved continued nutrition and hydration for persons in a vegetative status. While making many exceptions, the Church ruled that "the provision of water and food, even by artificial means, always represents a natural means for preserving life."

== See also ==
- Criticism of the Catholic Church
- Glossary of the Catholic Church
- History of Christianity
- History of the Papacy
- History of Western civilization
- Index of Catholic Church articles
- Index of Vatican City-related articles
- John Paul II
- Outline of Catholicism
- Role of the Catholic Church in civilization
- Second Vatican Council
- Timeline of the Catholic Church

== Footnotes ==
=== Sources ===
- Duffy, Eamon (1997). Saints and Sinners, a History of the Popes. Yale University Press. ISBN 978-0-300-07332-4.
- Walsh, Mary Ann; Thavis, John (2003). John Paul II: A Light for the World, Essays and Reflections on the Papacy of. Rowman & Littlefield. ISBN 978-1-58051-142-1.
- Norman, Edward (2007). The Roman Catholic Church, An Illustrated History. University of California Press. ISBN 978-0-520-25251-6.
- Steinfels, Peter (2003). A People Adrift: The Crisis of the Roman Catholic Church in America. Simon & Schuster. ISBN 978-0-684-83663-8.
- Bokenkotter, Thomas (2004). A Concise History of the Catholic Church. Doubleday. ISBN 978-0-385-50584-0.
- Bruni, Frank; Burkett, Elinor (2002). A Gospel of Shame: Children, Sexual Abuse, and the Catholic Church. Harper Perennial. p. 336. ISBN 978-0-06-052232-2.
