= Quinquennial visit ad limina =

Formal visit of a bishop to the Pope every five years

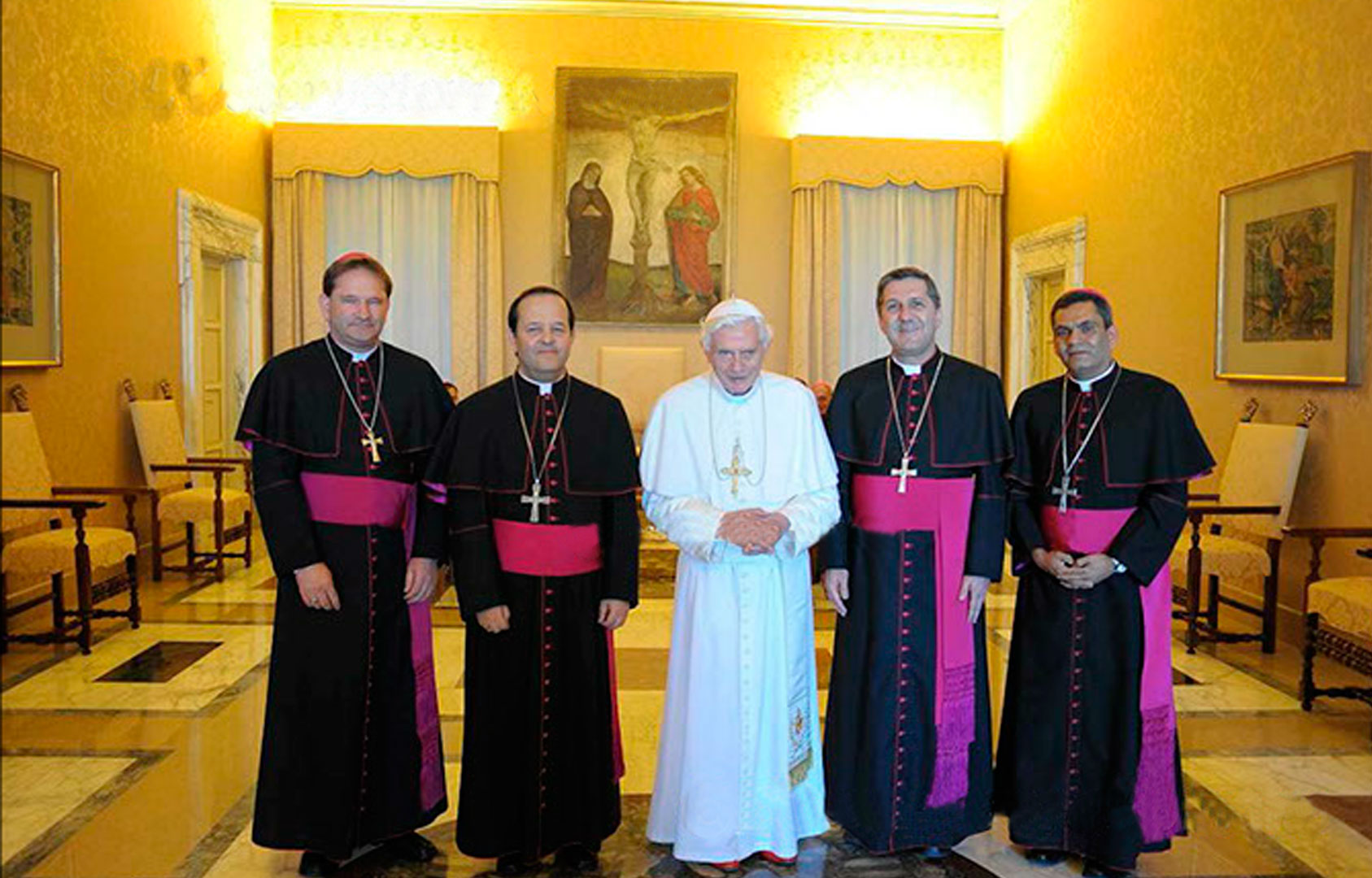
Archbishops of Medellín visiting Pope Benedict XVI in September 2012

A quinquennial visit ad limina, or simply an ad limina visit, is the required visit of Catholic residential diocesan bishops and certain prelates with territorial jurisdiction (such as territorial abbots) to the thresholds of the [tombs of the] Apostles Peter and Paul, and to meet the Pope to report on the state of their dioceses or prelatures.

It is a formal trip usually made together by all bishops from a single region (viz., an episcopal conference) to discuss with the Pope issues specific to their regions. It is separate from other trips a bishop might make to the Vatican, such as to attend a synod. The ad limina visit happens every five years, or quinquennially.

Limina is the accusative plural of the Latin noun limen, meaning literally "a threshold; the head-piece or foot-piece of a doorway," and in a transferred sense, "a house", "dwelling", or "abode." The Latin preposition ad means "to", "toward", or "at."

== History ==
In 743 a Roman synod decreed that all bishops subject to the metropolitan see of Rome should meet personally every year in that city to give an account of the state of their dioceses. Pope Gregory VII included in the order all metropolitans of the Western Church.

In 1585 Pope Sixtus V issued the constitution Romanus Pontifex, which set forth the norm for visits ad limina. On December 31, 1909, Pope Pius X stated in a Decree for the Consistorial Congregation that a bishop needs to deliver an account of the state of his diocese to the Pope once every five years, starting in 1911.

The current requirements for the ad limina visit are the subject of canon: 371, 399–400 of the 1983 Code of Canon Law and canon: 206–208 of the 1990 Code of Canons for the Eastern Churches. Previously regulated by 1917 Code of Canon Law canon: 299–300, 340–342.

== See also ==
- Glossary of the Catholic Church
- Index of Catholic Church articles
