= Guidetti =

Guidetti (pronounced [ɡwiˈdetti]) is an Italian surname derived from the given name Guido. Notable people with the surname include:

- Daria Guidetti (born 1978), Italian astrophysicist
- Ettore Guidetti (born 1974), Italian volleyball coach
- Giovanni Guidetti (born 1972), Italian volleyball coach
- John Guidetti (born 1992), Swedish football player
- Luca Guidetti (born 1986), Italian footballer
