= Outline of the Catholic Church =

Overview of and topical guide to the Catholic Church

The following outline is provided as an overview of and topical guide to the Catholic Church:

Catholicism – largest denomination of Christianity. Catholicism encompasses the body of the Catholic faith, its theologies and doctrines, its liturgical, ethical, spiritual, and behavioral characteristics, as well as a religious people as a whole.

== Nature of Catholicism ==
Catholicism can be described as all of the following:

- a religious denomination
  - a denomination of Christianity
  - the Catholic Church

== Geography of the Catholic Church ==
- Vatican City
- Catholic Church by country
- Global organisation of the Catholic Church

== History of the Catholic Church ==
History of the Catholic Church – the church says that its bishops are the successors to the Apostles of Jesus, and that the Bishop of Rome, also known as the Pope, is the sole successor to Saint Peter, who is believed to have been appointed head of the church in the New Testament and who is said to have ministered in Rome.

- History of the Papacy – The history of the papacy, the office held by the pope as head of the Catholic Church, spans from the time of Saint Peter to present day.
- Outline of the Catholic ecumenical councils – Catholic Ecumenical Councils include 21 councils over a period of 1700 years. While definitions changed throughout history, in today's Roman Catholic understanding Ecumenical Councils are assemblies of Patriarchs, Cardinals, residing Bishops, Abbots, male heads of religious orders and other juridical persons, nominated by the Roman Pontiff.

=== Origins and Early Christianity ===
- Jesus – Jesus of Nazareth (7–2 BC/BCE to 30–36 AD/CE), also referred to as Jesus Christ, Jesus the Christ or simply Christ, is the central figure of Christianity.
- Apostles in the New Testament – The Christian apostles were sent out to convey the message of the good news of Jesus Christ.
- Early Christianity – Early Christianity is generally considered as Christianity before 325.

=== Late Antiquity ===
- Constantine I – When Constantine became emperor of the Western Roman Empire in 312, attributing his victory to the Christian God, he legalized the practice of Christianity
- Theodosius I – Made Nicene Christianity the state religion of the Roman Empire in 380.
- First seven Ecumenical Councils – from the First Council of Nicaea (325) to the Second Council of Nicaea (787), represent an attempt to reach an orthodox consensus and to establish a unified Christendom as the State church of the Roman Empire.

=== Middle Ages ===
==== Early Middle Ages ====
- Decline of the Roman Empire – in 476, Rome fell.
- Rule of St. Benedict – written by Benedict in 530 AD
- Cathedral schools – begin in 500's.
- Mission (Christianity) – Christian missionary activities often involve sending individuals and groups (called "missionaries"), to foreign countries and to places in their own homeland.
  - Augustine of Canterbury – missionary to the Anglo-Saxons
  - Hiberno-Scottish mission – a mission led by Irish and Scottish monks which spread Christianity and established monasteries in Great Britain and continental Europe during the Middle Ages.
- Charlemagne – also known as Charles the Great was King of the Franks from 768 and Emperor of the Romans from 800 to his death in 814.

==== High Middle Ages ====
- Cluniac reform – began in 910 and placed abbots under the direct control of the pope rather than the secular control of feudal lords.
- East-West schism – sometimes known as the Great Schism, formally divided the State church of the Roman Empire into Eastern (Greek) and Western (Latin) branches, which later became known as the Eastern Orthodox Church and the Roman Catholic Church, respectively.
- Crusades – a series of religious expeditionary wars blessed by the Pope and the Catholic Church, with the stated goal of restoring Christian access to the holy places in and near Jerusalem.
- Romanesque architecture – massive walls, rounded arches and ceilings of masonry.
- Gothic architecture – large windows and high, pointed arches, improved lighting and geometric harmony in a manner that was intended to direct the worshiper's mind to God who "orders all things".
- new monastic orders –
- Catharism – a Christian religious movement with dualistic and gnostic elements that appeared in the Languedoc region of France and other parts of Europe in the 11th century and flourished in the 12th and 13th centuries.
- Medieval Inquisition – a series of Inquisitions (Catholic Church bodies charged with suppressing heresy) from around 1184, including the Episcopal Inquisition (1184-1230s) and later the Papal Inquisition (1230s).
- Avignon Papacy – the period from 1309 to 1376 during which seven popes resided in Avignon, in modern-day France.
- Western Schism – a split within the Catholic Church from 1378 to 1417. Two men simultaneously claimed to be the true pope.

=== Renaissance and Reforms ===
==== Reformation ====
- Council of Constance –
- Council of Basel –
- Protestant Reformation – The Protestant Reformation was the 16th-century schism within Western Christianity initiated by Martin Luther, John Calvin and other early Protestants sparked by the 1517 posting of Luther's Ninety-five theses.
- The Ninety Five Theses – the 95 theses of Martin Luther
- Thirty years war –
- French wars of religion –
- Counter-Reformation – The Counter-Reformation (also the Catholic Revival[1] or Catholic Reformation) was the period of Catholic revival beginning with the Council of Trent (1545–1563) and ending at the close of the Thirty Years' War, 1648 as a response to the Protestant Reformation.

=== Baroque period ===
- Ottoman Wars in Europe – Ottoman Empire conquers the Byzantine Empire
- Age of Enlightenment – questioned Christianity as a whole; elevated human reason above divine revelation and down-graded religious authorities such as the papacy based on it.
- Jansenism – emphasized original sin, human depravity, the necessity of divine grace, and predestination.
- Gallicanism – the belief that popular civil authority over the Catholic Church is comparable to that of the Pope's.
- Councilarism – a reform movement in the 14th, 15th and 16th century Roman Catholic Church which held that final authority in spiritual matters resided with the Roman Church as a corporation of Christians, embodied by a general church council, not with the pope.

=== Industrial Age ===
- First Vatican Council – convoked by Pope Pius IX on 29 June 1868, after a period of planning and preparation that began on 6 December 1864. It met in the Vatican Basilica, hence its name of First Vatican Council. Its best-known decision is its definition of papal infallibility.
- Rerum novarum – an open letter, passed to all Catholic bishops, that addressed the condition of the working classes.
- Quadragesimo anno – discusses the ethical implications of the social and economic order. He describes the major dangers for human freedom and dignity arising from unrestrained capitalism and totalitarian communism.
- Catholic social teaching – a body of doctrine developed by the Catholic Church on matters of poverty and wealth, economics, social organization and the role of the state.
- Roman Catholic Mariology – theology concerned with the Virgin Mary, the mother of Jesus Christ as developed by the Catholic Church.
- World War II –

- Mit brennender Sorge – a Catholic Church encyclical of Pope Pius XI, published on 10 March 1937 (but bearing a date of Passion Sunday, 14 March). Written in German, not the usual Latin, it was read from the pulpits of all German Catholic churches on one of the Church's busiest Sundays (Palm Sunday). It condemned breaches of the Reichskonkordat agreement signed between the Nazi government and the Church in 1933, and furthermore contained criticism of Nazism and, in the opinion of some, a veiled attack on Hitler.
- Holocaust – the genocide of approximately six million European Jews during World War II, a programme of systematic state-sponsored murder by Nazi Germany, led by Adolf Hitler, throughout Nazi-occupied territory.
- Pope Pius XII and the Holocaust – The relationship between Pope Pius XII and the Holocaust has long been disputed.

=== Post-Industrial Age ===
- Second Vatican Council (Vatican II) – addressed relations between the Roman Catholic Church and the modern world. It was the twenty-first Ecumenical Council of the Catholic Church and the second to be held at St. Peter's Basilica in the Vatican.

- Sacrosanctum Concilium – Sacrosanctum Concilium, the Constitution on the Sacred Liturgy, called for more "full, conscious, and active participation' by the laity in the Mass.
- Lumen gentium – Lumen Gentium, the Dogmatic Constitution on the Church, is one of the principal documents of the Second Vatican Council. As is customary with significant Roman Catholic Church documents, it is known by its first words, "Lumen gentium", Latin for "Light of the Nations".

- Subsistit in – Subsistit in (subsists in) is a Latin phrase, which appears in the eighth paragraph of Lumen Gentium, a landmark document of the Second Vatican Council of the Catholic Church:

- Nostra aetate – Nostra Aetate (Latin: In our Age) is the Declaration on the Relation of the Church with Non-Christian Religions of the Second Vatican Council. Passed by a vote of 2,221 to 88 of the assembled bishops, this declaration was promulgated on October 28, 1965, by Pope Paul VI.
- Dei verbum – Dei verbum on Sacred Scripture was promulgated by Pope Paul VI on November 18, 1965, following approval by the assembled bishops by a vote of 2,344 to 6.
- Gaudium et spes – Gaudium et Spes on the Church in the modern world is an updating of the Catholic Church's teachings about humanity's relationship to society, especially in reference to economics, poverty, social justice, culture, science, technology and ecumenism.

== Catholic Church hierarchy ==
Catholic Church hierarchy – the Catholic Church is composed of dioceses, each overseen by a bishop. Dioceses are divided into individual communities called parishes, each staffed by one or more priests. Priests may be assisted by deacons.

- Pope – The Pope (a child's word for father) is the Bishop of Rome and the leader of the worldwide Catholic Church.
- Cardinal (Catholicism) – A cardinal is a senior ecclesiastical official, usually an ordained bishop, and ecclesiastical prince of the Catholic Church.
- Patriarchs – Originally, a patriarch was a man who exercised autocratic authority as a pater familias over an extended family.
- Major archbishops – In the Eastern Catholic Churches, major archbishop is a title for an hierarch to whose archiepiscopal see is granted the same jurisdiction in his autonomous (sui juris) particular Church that an Eastern patriarch has in his.
- Primate (bishop) – Primate is a title or rank bestowed on some bishops in certain Christian churches.
- Metropolitan bishop – In Christian churches with episcopal polity, the rank of metropolitan bishop, or simply metropolitan, pertains to the diocesan bishop or archbishop (then more precisely called metropolitan archbishop) of a metropolis; that is, the chief city of a historical Roman province, ecclesiastical province, or regional capital.
- Archbishops – An archbishop is a bishop of higher rank, but not of higher sacramental order above that of the three orders of deacon, priest (presbyter), and bishop.
- Bishop (Catholic Church) – In the Catholic Church, a bishop is an ordained minister who holds the fullness of the sacrament of Holy Orders and is responsible for teaching doctrine, governing Catholics in his jurisdiction, and sanctifying the world and for representing the Church.
- Priest (Catholic Church) – The ministerial orders of the Roman Catholic Church include the orders of bishops, deacons and presbyters. The ordained priesthood and common priesthood (or priesthood of all the baptized) are different in function and essence.
- Deacon – The diaconate (deacons) is one of the major orders in the Catholic, Anglican, Eastern Orthodox, and Oriental Orthodox churches.

== Doctrine ==
=== Theology ===
Catechism of the Catholic Church – catechism promulgated for the Catholic Church by Pope John Paul II in 1992. The Catechism of the Catholic Church is a compendium of Catholic doctrine that serves as a reference text for teaching and particularly for preparing local catechisms. Modeled on the "Roman Catechism," promulgated in 1566 by the Council of Trent, the Catechism of the Catholic Church is divided into four parts of unequal length: the profession of faith, the celebration of the Christian mystery, life in Christ, and Christian prayer. A catechism is a summary or exposition of doctrine and serves as a learning introduction to the Sacraments traditionally used in catechesis, or Christian religious teaching of children and adult converts.

- Nicene Creed – The Nicene Creed is the creed or profession of faith that is most widely used in Christian liturgy. It is called Nicene because, in its original form, it was adopted in the city of Nicaea by the first ecumenical council, which met there in the year 325.
- Catholic theology of the body – In Roman Catholicism, the Theology of the Body is based on the premise that the human body has its origin in God.
- Divine grace – Divine grace is a theological term which is present in many and varied spiritual traditions.
- Roman Catholic dogma – In the Roman Catholic Church, a dogma is an article of faith revealed by God, which the magisterium of the Church presents to be believed.
- Four Marks of the Church – The Four Marks of the Church is a term describing four specific adjectives - one, holy, catholic and apostolic - indicating four major distinctive marks or distinguishing characteristics of the Christian Church.
- Original sin – Original sin is, according to a Christian theological doctrine, humanity's state of sin resulting from the Fall of Man.
- Salvation – Salvation, in religion, is the saving of the soul from sin and its consequences.
- Sermon on the Mount – The Sermon on the Mount (anglicized from the Matthean Vulgate Latin section title: Sermo in monte) is a collection of sayings and teachings of Jesus, which emphasizes his moral teaching found in the Gospel of Matthew (chapters 5, 6 and 7).
- Ten Commandments – The Ten Commandments, also known as the Decalogue, are a set of biblical principles relating to ethics and worship, which play a fundamental role in Judaism and most forms of Christianity.
- Trinity – The doctrine of the Trinity defines God as three divine persons: the Father, the Son (Jesus Christ), and the Holy Spirit.
- Christian worship – In Christianity, worship is adoration and contemplation of God.
- Catechism of the Catholic Church – The Catechism of the Catholic Church (or CCC) is the official text of the teachings of the Catholic Church.
- Papal infallibility – Papal infallibility is a dogma of the Catholic Church which states that, by action of the Holy Spirit, the Pope is preserved from even the possibility of error when in his official capacity he solemnly declares or promulgates to the universal Church a dogmatic teaching on faith or morals.

=== Sacraments of the Catholic Church ===
Sacraments of the Catholic Church – Roman Catholic teaching holds that there are seven sacraments which Christ instituted and entrusted to the Church. Sacraments are visible rituals that Catholics see as signs of God's presence and effective channels of God's grace to all those who receive them with the proper disposition (ex opere operato).

1. Anointing of the Sick (Catholic Church) – Anointing of the Sick is a sacrament of the Catholic Church that is administered to a Catholic "who, having reached the age of reason, begins to be in danger due to sickness or old age", except in the case of those who "persevere obstinately in manifest grave sin".
2. Baptism – In Catholic teaching, baptism is believed to be usually essential for salvation.
3. Confirmation (Catholic Church) – Confirmation is one of the seven sacraments through which Catholics pass in the process of their religious upbringing.
4. Eucharist in the Catholic Church – "At the Last Supper, on the night he was betrayed, our Savior instituted the Eucharistic sacrifice of his Body and Blood." (Catechism of the Catholic Church 1323)
5. Priesthood (Catholic Church) – The ministerial orders of the Roman Catholic Church include the orders of bishops, deacons and presbyters, which in Latin is sacerdos.
6. Catholic marriage – Catholic marriage, also called matrimony, is a "covenant by which a man and a woman establish between themselves a partnership of the whole of life and which is ordered by its nature to the good of the spouses and the procreation and education of offspring.
7. Sacrament of Penance (Catholic Church) – one of seven sacraments of the Catholic Church and sacred mysteries of the Orthodoxy, in which its faithful obtain Divine mercy for the sins committed against God and neighbour and are reconciled with the community of the Church

=== Mariology ===
Mariology – theological study of Mary, the mother of Jesus. Mariology methodically presents teachings about her to other parts of the faith, such as teachings about Jesus, redemption and grace. Christian Mariology aims to connect scripture, tradition and the teachings of the Church on Mary.

- Roman Catholic Mariology – theology concerned with the Virgin Mary, the mother of Jesus Christ as developed by the Catholic Church.
- Assumption of Mary – event which according to the belief of Christians of the Roman Catholic Church, Eastern Orthodoxy, Oriental Orthodoxy, and parts of Anglicanism, was the bodily taking up of the Virgin Mary into Heaven at the end of her life.
- History of Roman Catholic Mariology – traces theological developments and views regarding Mary from the early Church to the 20th century. Mariology is a mainly Catholic ecclesiological movement within theology, which centers on the relation of Mary and the Church.
- Immaculate Conception – dogma of the Catholic Church maintaining that the Blessed Virgin Mary was kept free of original sin from her moment of conception and was filled with the sanctifying grace normally conferred during baptism.
- Mariology of the popes – theological study of the influence that the popes have had on the development, formulation and transformation of the Roman Catholic Church's doctrines and devotions relating to the Blessed Virgin Mary.
- Mariology of the saints – Throughout history Roman Catholic Mariology has been influenced by a number of saints who have attested to the central role of Mary in God's plan of salvation.
- Mary (mother of Jesus) – Mary, variously called Saint Mary, Mother Mary, the Virgin Mary, the Theotokos, the Blessed Virgin Mary, Mary, Mother of God, was a Jewish woman of Nazareth in Galilee who lived in the late 1st century BC and early 1st century AD, and is considered by Christians to be the first proselyte to Christianity.
- Perpetual virginity of Mary – expresses the Virgin Mary's "real and perpetual virginity even in the act of giving birth to Jesus the Son of God made Man".
- Blessed Virgin Mary (Roman Catholic) – Roman Catholic veneration of the Blessed Virgin Mary is based on dogma as well as Holy Scripture: In the fullness of time, God sent his son, born of a woman.

== Personalities of the Church ==
=== Doctors of the Church ===
Doctor of the Church – title given by a variety of Christian churches to individuals whom they recognize as having been of particular importance, particularly regarding their contribution to theology or doctrine.

- Albertus Magnus – Albertus Magnus, O.P. (1193/1206 - November 15, 1280), also known as Albert the Great and Albert of Cologne, is a Catholic saint.
- Ambrose – Aurelius Ambrosius, better known in English as Saint Ambrose (c. between 337 and 340 - 4 April 397), was a bishop of Milan who became one of the most influential ecclesiastical figures of the 4th century. He was one of the four original doctors of the Church.
- Anselm of Canterbury – Anselm of Canterbury (Aosta c. 1033 - Canterbury 21 April 1109), also called of Aosta for his birthplace, and of Bec for his home monastery, was a Benedictine monk, a philosopher, and a prelate of the Church who held the office of Archbishop of Canterbury from 1093 to 1109.
- Anthony of Padua – Anthony of Padua or Anthony of Lisbon, O.F.M., (15 August 1195 - 13 June 1231) was a Portuguese Catholic priest and friar of the Franciscan Order.
- Thomas Aquinas – Thomas Aquinas, O.P. (1225 - 7 March 1274), also Thomas of Aquin or Aquino, was an Italian Dominican priest of the Roman Catholic Church, and an immensely influential philosopher and theologian in the tradition of scholasticism, known as Doctor Angelicus ([the] Angelic Doctor), Doctor Communis, or Doctor Universalis.
- Athanasius of Alexandria – Athanasius of Alexandria (b. ca. 296-298 - d. 2 May 373) is also given the titles St. Athanasius the Great, St. Athanasius I of Alexandria, St Athanasius the Confessor and (in the Coptic Orthodox Church, mainly) St Athanasius the Apostolic.
- Augustine of Hippo – Augustine of Hippo (November 13, 354 - August 28, 430), also known as Augustine, St. Augustine, St. Austin, St. Augoustinos, Blessed Augustine, or St. Augustine the Blessed, was Bishop of Hippo Regius (present-day Annaba, Algeria). He was a Latin philosopher and theologian from Roman Africa. His writings were very influential in the development of Western Christianity.
- Basil of Caesarea – Basil of Caesarea, also called Saint Basil the Great, (329 or 330 - January 1, 379) was the Greek bishop of Caesarea Mazaca in Cappadocia, Asia Minor (modern-day Turkey).
- Bede – Bede (672/673 - 26 May 735), also referred to as Saint Bede or the Venerable Bede, was an English monk at the Northumbrian monastery of Saint Peter at Monkwearmouth and of its companion monastery, Saint Paul's, in modern Jarrow (see Monkwearmouth-Jarrow), both in the Kingdom of Northumbria.
- Robert Bellarmine – Robert Bellarmine (full name in Italian: Roberto Francesco Romolo Bellarmino) (4 October 1542 - 17 September 1621) was an Italian Jesuit and a Cardinal of the Catholic Church.
- Bernard of Clairvaux – Bernard of Clairvaux, O.Cist (1090 - August 20, 1153) was a French abbot and the primary builder of the reforming Cistercian order.
- Bonaventure – Bonaventure (1221 - 1274) was an Italian Franciscan scholastic theologian.
- Petrus Canisius – Peter Canisius, S.J. (Dutch: Pieter Kanis), (8 May 1521 - 21 December 1597) was an important Jesuit Catholic priest who fought against the spread of Protestantism in Germany, Austria, Bohemia, Moravia, and Switzerland.
- Catherine of Siena – (1347 - 1380) Lay member of the Dominican Order and known for her strong influence in the papacy and the many letters she authored.
- Peter Chrysologus – Peter Chrysologus (c. 380 - c. 450) was Bishop of Ravenna from about AD 433 until his death.
- John Chrysostom – John Chrysostom (c. 347–407), Archbishop of Constantinople, was an important Early Church Father.
- Cyril of Alexandria – Cyril of Alexandria (c. 376 - 444) was the Patriarch of Alexandria from 412 to 444.
- Cyril of Jerusalem – Cyril of Jerusalem was a distinguished theologian of the early Church (ca. 313[1] - 386).
- Peter Damian – Saint Peter Damian, O.S.B. (Petrus Damiani, also Pietro Damiani or Pier Damiani; c. 1007[1] - February 21/22, 1072) was a reforming monk in the circle of Pope Gregory VII and a cardinal.
- Ephrem the Syrian – 28 January (Eastern Orthodox Church, Eastern Catholic Churches) 7th Saturday before Easter (Syriac Orthodox Church) June 9 (Roman Catholic Church)
- Francis de Sales – Francis de Sales, T.O.M., A.O.F.M. Cap., (August 21, 1567Â - December 28, 1622) was a Bishop of Geneva and is honored as a saint in the Roman Catholic Church.
- Gregory of Nazianzus – Gregory of Nazianzus (c. 329[1] - January 25 389 or 390) was a 4th-century Archbishop of Constantinople.
- Pope Gregory I – Pope Gregory I (Latin: Gregorius I) (c. 540 - 12 March 604), better known in English as Gregory the Great, was pope from 3 September 590 until his death.
- Hilary of Poitiers – Hilary of Poitiers (c. 300 - c. 368) was Bishop of Poitiers and is a Doctor of the Church.
- Isidore of Seville – Saint Isidore of Seville (c. 560 - 4 April 636) served as Archbishop of Seville for more than three decades and is considered, as the historian Montalembert put it in an oft-quoted phrase, "le dernier savant du monde ancien" ("the last scholar of the ancient world").
- Jerome – Saint Jerome (ca 347 - 30 September 420; was a Roman Christian priest, confessor, theologian and historian, and who became a Doctor of the Church.
- John of Damascus – Saint John of Damascus (c. 645 or 676 - 4 December 749) was a Syrian monk and priest.
- John of the Cross – John of the Cross (San Juan de la Cruz) (24 June 1542 - 14 December 1591), born Juan de Yepes Álvarez, was a major figure of the Counter-Reformation, a Spanish mystic, Catholic saint, Carmelite friar and priest, born at Fontiveros, Old Castile.
- Lawrence of Brindisi – Saint Lawrence of Brindisi, O.F.M. Cap., (July 22, 1559, Brindisi, Apulia - July 22, 1619), born Giulio Cesare Russo, was a Catholic priest and a member of the Order of Friars Minor Capuchin.
- Pope Leo I – Pope Leo I, also known as Leo the Great (c. 391 or 400 - 10 November 461) was the Bishop of Rome - the Pope - of the Catholic Church from 29 September 440 to his death on 10 November 461.
- Alphonsus Maria de Liguori – Saint Alphonsus Maria de Liguori (September 27, 1696 - August 1, 1787) was an Italian Catholic bishop, spiritual writer, scholastic philosopher and theologian, and founder of the Redemptorists, an influential religious congregation.
- Teresa of Avila – Saint Teresa of Avila (March 28, 1515 - October 4, 1582) was a prominent Spanish mystic, Roman Catholic saint, Carmelite nun, and writer of the Counter Reformation, and theologian of contemplative life through mental prayer.
- Thérèse of Lisieux – Saint Thérèse of Lisieux (2 January 1873 - 30 September 1897), or Saint Thérèse of the Child Jesus and the Holy Face, was a French Carmelite nun.

=== A short list of popes ===
- Pope Francis (17 December 1936 - 21 April 2025) – first Jesuit pope and first from the Southern Hemisphere or Americas. See also Theology of Pope Francis.
- Pope Benedict XVI (16 April 1927 - 31st December 2022) – first pope to retire in modern times. See also Theology of Pope Benedict XVI.
- Pope John Paul II (18 May 1920 - 2 April 2005) – the second-longest serving pope in history and the first non-Italian since 1523.
- Pope John Paul I (17 October 1912 - 28 September 1978) – reigned 33 days.
- Pope Paul VI (26 September 1897 - 6 August 1978) – promulgated many of the decisions of Vatican II.
- Pope John XXIII (25 November 1881 - 3 June 1963) – headed the Catholic Church and ruled Vatican City from 1958 until his death.
- Pope Pius XII (2 March 1876 - 9 October 1958) – reigned from 2 March 1939 until his death in 1958.
- Pope Pius XI (31 May 1857 - 10 February 1939) – born Ambrogio Damiano Achille Ratti, was Pope from 6 February 1922, and sovereign of Vatican City from its creation as an independent state on 11 February 1929 until his death on 10 February 1939.
- Pope Benedict XV (21 November 1854 - 22 January 1922) – born Giacomo Paolo Giovanni Battista della Chiesa, reigned as Pope from 3 September 1914 to 22 January 1922.
- Pope Pius X (2 June 1835 - 20 August 1914) – born Giuseppe Melchiorre Sarto, was the 257th Pope of the Catholic Church, serving from 1903 to 1914.
- Pope Leo XIII (2 March 1810 - 20 July 1903) – born Vincenzo Gioacchino Raffaele Luigi Pecci to an Italian comital family, the 256th Pope of the Roman Catholic Church, serving from 1878 to 1903.
- Pope Pius IX (13 May 1792 - 7 February 1878) – born Giovanni Maria Mastai-Ferretti, longest-reigning elected Pope in Catholic Church history, 32 years from 16 June 1846 until his death.
- Saint Peter – Simon Peter (died AD 64–68) is traditionally accredited as the first bishop of Rome by the Catholic and Orthodox churches.

== Religious institutes ==
Religious institute – "a society in which members...pronounce public vows...and lead a life of brothers or sisters in common".

- Assumptionists – a congregation of Catholic religious, founded by Fr. d'Alzon in 1845 and initially approved by Rome in 1857.
- Augustinians – two separate and unrelated types of Catholic religious orders: several orders of mendicants, and various congregations of clerics following the Rule of St. Augustine.
- Benedictines – the spirituality and consecrated life in accordance with the Rule of St Benedict
- Carmelites – a Catholic religious order said to be founded in the 12th century on Mount Carmel.
- Carthusians – also called the Order of St. Bruno. A Roman Catholic religious order of enclosed monastics.
- Congregation of Holy Cross – a Catholic congregation of priests and brothers founded in 1837 by Blessed Father Basil Moreau
- Dominican Order – a Catholic religious order founded by Saint Dominic.
- Franciscan – members of Roman Catholic religious orders founded by Saint Francis of Assisi.
- Oratory of Saint Philip Neri – a society of apostolic life of Catholic priests and lay-brothers
- Order of Friars Minor Capuchin – an Order of friars in the Catholic Church, a major offshoot of the Franciscans.
- Society of apostolic life – a group of men or women within the Catholic Church who have come together for a specific purpose.
- Society of Jesus – a Catholic religious order founded by St. Ignatius of Loyola.
- Legionaries of Christ: The Legionaries of Christ are a religious congregation of priests and seminarians, and part of the Regnum Christi Federation. They live in communities, and make vows of poverty, chastity and obedience.

== Churches and liturgical rites within Catholicism ==
=== Particular Churches within the Catholic Church ===
Particular Church – In Catholic canon law, a particular Church (Latin: ecclesia particularis) is an ecclesiastical community headed by a bishop or someone recognised as the equivalent of a bishop.

The Latin Church is the largest sui iuris particular Church within the Catholic Church and the only non-Eastern one.

==== Eastern (non-Latin) Catholic Churches ====
- Albanian Greek Catholic Church – an autonomous Byzantine-Rite particular Church in communion with Rome.
- Armenian Catholic Church – an Eastern Catholic Church accepting the Bishop of Rome as spiritual leader of the Church.
- Belarusian Greek Catholic Church – the heir within Belarus of the Union of Brest.
- Bulgarian Greek Catholic Church – a Byzantine-Rite particular Church in full union with the Roman Catholic Church.
- Chaldean Catholic Church – an Eastern Syriac particular church of the Catholic Church, maintaining full communion with the Bishop of Rome and the rest of the Catholic Church.
- Coptic Catholic Church – an Alexandrian-Rite Church in full communion with the Pope of Rome.
- Eparchy of Križevci – part of the Byzantine Church of Croatia, Serbia and Montenegro, a recognized sui iuris Catholic Church
- Eritrean Catholic Church – a sui iuris particular Church within the Catholic Church that separated from the Ethiopian Catholic Church in 2015.
- Ethiopian Catholic Church – a metropolitan Eastern particular Church within the Catholic Church.
- Greek Byzantine Catholic Church – a sui iuris particular Church in full union with the Roman Catholic Church; uses the Byzantine liturgical rite in the Koine Greek and modern Greek languages.
- Hungarian Greek Catholic Church – a Byzantine-Rite sui juris particular Church in full union with the Catholic Church
- Italo-Albanian Catholic Church – also referred to as the Italo-Greek Catholic Church, is one of the 23 Eastern Catholic Churches which, together with the Latin Church, comprise the Catholic Church.
- Macedonian Greek Catholic Church – called the Macedonian Byzantine Catholic Church, is a Byzantine-Rite sui juris Eastern Catholic Church in full union with the Roman Catholic Church.
- Maronite Church – an Eastern Catholic Church in full communion with the Holy See of Rome
- Melkite Greek Catholic Church – an Eastern Catholic Church in full communion with the Holy See as part of the worldwide Catholic Church.
- Romanian Church United with Rome, Greek-Catholic – an Eastern Catholic Church which in full union with the Roman Catholic Church.
- Russian Greek Catholic Church – a Byzantine-Rite church sui juris in full union with the Catholic Church.
- Ruthenian Greek Catholic Church – a sui iuris Eastern Catholic Church, which uses the Divine Liturgy of the Constantinopolitan or Byzantine Eastern Rite.
- Slovak Greek Catholic Church – a Byzantine-Rite particular Church in full union with the Catholic Church.
- Syriac Catholic Church – a Christian church in the Levant having practices and rites in common with the Syriac Orthodox Church.
- Syro-Malabar Catholic Church – an East-Syriac-Rite, Major Archiepiscopal Church in full communion with the Catholic Church.
- Syro-Malankara Catholic Church – an Eastern Catholic Church in full communion with the Holy See.
- Ukrainian Greek Catholic Church – the largest Eastern Catholic sui juris particular church in full communion with the Holy See.

=== Liturgical rites within the Catholic Church ===
Liturgy – customary public worship by a specific religious group, according to its particular beliefs, customs and traditions. See Catholic liturgy.

==== Western liturgical rites ====
- Ambrosian Rite – Ambrosian Rite, also called the Milanese Rite, is a Catholic liturgical Western Rite.
- Mozarabic Rite – The Mozarabic, Visigothic, or Hispanic Rite is a form of Catholic worship within the Latin Church, and in the Spanish Reformed Episcopal Church (Anglican).
- Roman Rite – The Roman Rite is the liturgical rite used in the Diocese of Rome in the Catholic Church.
- Anglican Use – The term "Anglican Use", in the proper sense, is the variant of the Roman Rite used by personal parishes in the United States founded under the terms of the Pastoral Provision for former members of the United States Episcopal Church. The term is sometimes loosely applied to the Divine Worship or Ordinariate Use of the personal ordinariates for former Anglicans.
- Sarum Rite – The Sarum Rite (more properly, the Use of Salisbury) was a variant of the Roman Rite widely used for the ordering of Christian public worship, including the Mass and the Divine Office.

==== Eastern liturgical rites ====
- Alexandrian Rite – The Alexandrian Rite is officially called the Liturgy of Saint Mark, traditionally regarded as the first bishop of Alexandria.
- Antiochene Rite – Antiochene Rite designates the family of liturgies originally used in the Patriarchate of Antioch.
- Armenian Rite – The Armenian Rite is an independent liturgy. This rite is used by both the Armenian Apostolic and Armenian Catholic Churches; it is also the rite of a significant number of Eastern Catholic Christians in the Republic of Georgia.
- Byzantine Rite – The Byzantine Rite, sometimes called the Rite of Constantinople or Constantinopolitan Rite is the liturgical rite used currently (in various languages, with various uses) by all the Eastern Orthodox Churches, by the Greek Catholic Churches (Eastern Catholic Churches which use the Byzantine Rite), and in a substantially modified form by the Protestant Ukrainian Lutheran Church.
- East Syriac Rite – The East Syriac Rite is a Christian liturgy, also known as the Assyro-Chaldean Rite, Assyrian or Chaldean Rite, and the Persian Rite although it originated in Edessa, Mesopotamia.

== Current issues ==
- Catholic social teaching – Catholic social teaching is a body of doctrine developed by the Catholic Church on matters of poverty and wealth, economics, social organization and the role of the state.
- Catholic teachings on sexual morality – Catholic teachings on sexual morality draw from natural law, Sacred Scripture and Sacred Tradition and are promulgated authoritatively by the Magisterium.
- Catholic ordination of women – The Roman Catholic Church doctrine on the ordination of women, as expressed in the current canon law and the Catechism of the Catholic Church, is that: "Only a baptized man validly receives sacred ordination."
- Catholic sex abuse cases – The Catholic sex abuse cases are a series of convictions, trials and ongoing investigations into allegations of sex crimes committed by Catholic priests and members of religious orders.
- Criticism of the Catholic Church.

== See also ==
- Index of Catholic Church articles
- Glossary of the Catholic Church
- Outline of Christianity
