= Occult Compensation =

Christian term

Occult Compensation is, in the Catholic tradition, the extra-legal taking of goods from a person who has refused to meet the demands of justice, for a value equivalent to the loss or damage inflicted.

== Background ==
Occult compensation is a demand in commutative justice and deducible from the principle of self-defense. It is open to all manner of abuses, but the utter denial of it gives the weak no redress against the oppression of the strong.

Catholics believe that occult compensation is justifiable only when

1. The right of the creditor is certain
2. No recourse to the law is possible or feasible

If the debtor or his heirs later make redress, restitution is necessary. Reasonable efforts must be made to prevent scandal.
