= Theology of Pope Benedict XVI =

The theology of Pope Benedict XVI, as promulgated during his pontificate, consists mainly of three encyclical letters on love (2005), hope (2007), and "charity in truth" (2009), as well as apostolic documents and various speeches and interviews. Pope Benedict XVI's theology underwent developments over the years, many of which were characterized by his leadership position in the Congregation for the Doctrine of the Faith, which is entrusted with preserving the Catholic faith in its entirety.

His theology originated in the view that God speaks to us through the Church today and not just through the Bible. The Bible does not teach natural science but rather it is a testimonial to God's revelation.

== Theology ==
Benedict spoke as a theologian and as prefect of the Congregation for the Doctrine of the Faith long before he became Pope. It is in his three encyclicals and other papal letters that we see his evolving theology combined with his authority as Pope.

=== God is Love ===
In his first Encyclical as Pope, Deus caritas est, Benedict XVI describes God as love, and talks about the love which God lavishes upon us and which we in turn must share with others through acts of charity.

His letter has two parts. A theological speculative part, in which he describes "the intrinsic link between that Love and the reality of human love". The second part deals with practical aspects, and calls the world to new energy and commitment in its response to God's love.

Benedict writes about love of God, and considers this important and significant, because we live in a time in which "the name of God is sometimes associated with vengeance or even a duty of hatred and violence":

We have come to know and to believe in the love God has for us. We have come to believe in God's love: in these words the Christian can express the fundamental decision of his life. Being Christian is not the result of an ethical choice or a lofty idea, but the encounter with an event, a person, which gives life a new horizon and a decisive direction. Saint John's Gospel describes that event in these words: "God so loved the world that he gave his only Son, that whoever believes in him should … have eternal life" (3:16). In acknowledging the centrality of love, Christian faith has retained the core of Israel's faith, while at the same time giving it new depth and breadth. The pious Jew prayed daily the words of the Book of Deuteronomy which expressed the heart of his existence: "Hear, O Israel: the Lord our God is one Lord, and you shall love the Lord your God with all your heart, and with all your soul and with all your might" (6:4–5). Jesus united into a single precept this commandment of love for God and the commandment of love for neighbour found in the Book of Leviticus: "You shall love your neighbour as yourself" (19:18; cf. Mk 12:29–31). Since God has first loved us (cf. 1 Jn 4:10), love is now no longer a mere "command"; it is the response to the gift of love with which God draws near to us.

— Deus caritas est, 1

Benedict develops a positive view of sex and eros in this first encyclical, which would do away with the Victorian view of the human body. Love between man and woman is a gift of God, which should not be exploited:

Nowadays Christianity of the past is often criticized as having been opposed to the body; and it is quite true that tendencies of this sort have always existed. ... but ... eros, reduced to pure "sex", has become a commodity, a mere "thing" to be bought and sold, or rather, man himself becomes a commodity. This is hardly man's great "yes" to the body. On the contrary, he now considers his body and his sexuality as the purely material part of himself, to be used and exploited at will.

In the encyclical Benedict avoids condemnations which characterized his writing as prefect of the Congregation for the Doctrine of the Faith and also corrects a view of sex as purely for procreation.

=== Faith-based hope ===
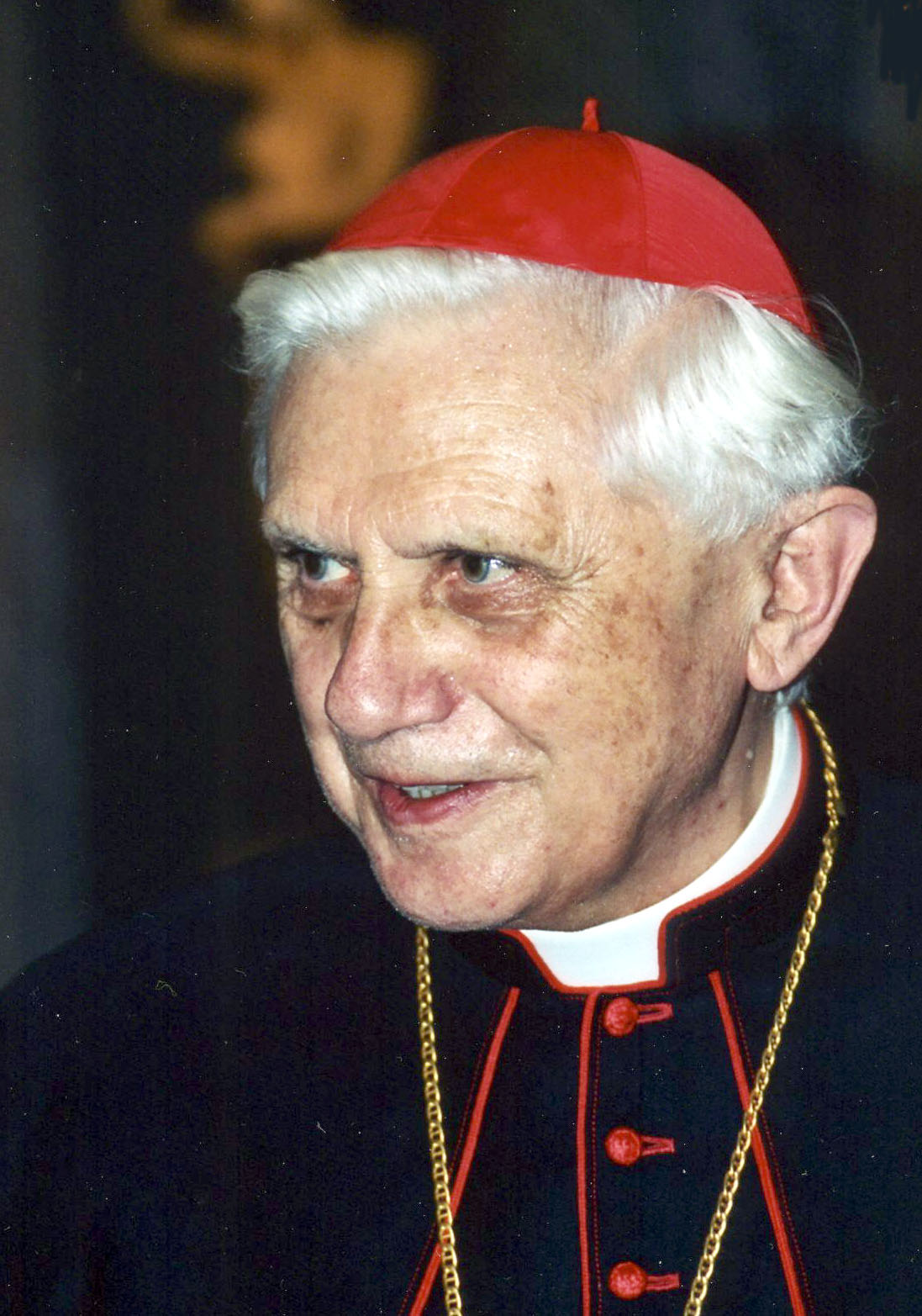

In his second encyclical, Spe Salvi, Benedict XVI explains the concept of faith-based hope in the New Testament and the early Church. He suggests a redirection of often short-sighted hopes. Real hope must be based on faith in God who is love. Christ, the most manifest expression of God's love, dies on the cross not to end slavery, miseries or other temporal problems.

Benedict argues in his letter against two mistaken notions of hope: 1.) Christians who may have focused their hopes too much on their own eternal salvation, and 2.) those who have placed their hope exclusively on science, rationality, freedom and justice for all, thus excluding any notion of God and eternity. Christians find lasting hope by finding their loving God, and this has real consequences for everyday life. In his commentary on slavery, Benedict takes the attitude of Christians in the Roman Empire:

We have raised the question: can our encounter with the God who in Christ has shown us his face and opened his heart be for us too not just "informative" but "performative"—that is to say, can it change our lives, so that we know we are redeemed through the hope that it expresses? Before attempting to answer the question, let us return once more to the early Church. It is not difficult to realize that the experience of the African slave-girl Bakhita was also the experience of many in the period of nascent Christianity who were beaten and condemned to slavery. Christianity did not bring a message of social revolution like that of the ill-fated Spartacus, whose struggle led to so much bloodshed. Jesus was not Spartacus, he was not engaged in a fight for political liberation like Barabbas or Bar-Kochba. Jesus, who himself died on the Cross, brought something totally different: an encounter with the Lord of all lords, an encounter with the living God and thus an encounter with a hope stronger than the sufferings of slavery, a hope which therefore transformed life and the world from within.

— Spe Salvi, 4

Benedict refers to St. Paul who wrote from prison "Paul is sending the slave back to the master from whom he had fled, not ordering but asking: 'I appeal to you for my child ... whose father I have become in my imprisonment ... I am sending him back to you, sending my very heart ... perhaps this is why he was parted from you for a while, that you might have him back for ever, no longer as a slave but more than a slave, as a beloved brother'" (Philem 10–16). He refers then to the Letter to the Hebrews, which says that Christians here on earth do not have a permanent homeland, but seek one which lies in the future (cf. Heb 11:13–16; Phil 3:20).

To Benedict, this does not mean for one moment that they lived only for the future: present society is recognized by Christians as an exile; they belong to a new society which is the goal of their common pilgrimage and which is anticipated in the course of that pilgrimage. A Christian has a present and future, because of the hope for Jesus Christ, which is life changing. All serious and upright human conduct is hope in action. This hope gives a realistic perspective to understanding suffering and helping others: We can try to limit suffering, to fight against it, but we cannot eliminate it. It is when we attempt to avoid suffering by withdrawing from anything that might involve hurt, when we try to spare ourselves the effort and pain of pursuing truth, love, and goodness, that we drift into a life of emptiness, in which there may be almost no pain, but the dark sensation of meaninglessness and abandonment is all the greater.

Benedict believes that not by sidestepping or fleeing from suffering are we healed, but rather by our capacity for accepting it, maturing through it and finding meaning through union with Christ, who suffered with infinite love.

=== The Eucharist and the Church ===
In a special letter on the Eucharist and the Church, Benedict describes the Eucharist as the causal principle of the Church.

Through the sacrament of the Eucharist Jesus draws the faithful into his "hour; " he shows us the bond that he willed to establish between himself and us, between his own person and the Church

— Sacramentum Caritatis, 14

A contemplative gaze "upon him whom they have pierced" (Jn 19:37) leads us to reflect on the causal connection between Christ's sacrifice, the Eucharist, and the Church. The Church "draws her life from the Eucharist" (31). Since the Eucharist makes present Christ's redeeming sacrifice, we must start by acknowledging that "there is a causal influence of the Eucharist at the Church's very origins." The Eucharist is Christ who gives himself to us and continually builds us up as his body. Hence, in the striking interplay between the Eucharist which builds up the Church, and the Church herself which "makes" the Eucharist, the primary causality is expressed in the first formula: the Church is able to celebrate Christ present in the Eucharist precisely because Christ first gave himself to her in the sacrifice of the Cross. The Church's ability to "make" the Eucharist is completely rooted in Christ's self-gift to her.

What does this mean? According to Benedict, the Eucharist, which is union with Christ, has a profound impact on our social relations. Because "union with Christ is also union with all those to whom he gives himself. I cannot possess Christ just for myself; I can belong to him only in union with all those who have become, or who will become, his own."

The relationship between the Eucharistic mystery and social commitment must be made explicit. The Eucharist is the sacrament of communion between brothers and sisters who allow themselves to be reconciled in Christ, who made of Jews and pagans one people, tearing down the wall of hostility which divided them (cf. Eph 2:14). Only this constant impulse towards reconciliation enables us to partake worthily of the Body and Blood of Christ (cf. Mt 5:23–24).

— Sacramentum Caritatis, 242

== Theology, science and the dialogue with other cultures ==
In an address to the faculty at the University of Regensburg, Germany, Benedict discussed the preconditions for an effective dialogue with Islam and other cultures. This requires a review of theology and science. The Pope considers the modern concept of science too narrow in the long run, because it allows the determination of "certainty" only from the interplay of mathematical and empirical elements. "Anything that would claim to be science must be measured against this criterion. Hence the human sciences, such as history, psychology, sociology and philosophy, attempt to conform themselves to this canon of science."

This limited view of scientific method excludes the question of God, making it appear an unscientific or pre-scientific question. For philosophy and, albeit in a different way, for theology, listening to the great experiences and insights of the religious traditions of humanity, and those of the Christian faith in particular, is a source of knowledge, and to ignore it would be an unacceptable restriction of our listening and responding.

The West has long been endangered by this aversion to the questions which underlie its rationality, and can only suffer great harm thereby

— Pope Benedict XVI's Regensburg Lecture

Benedict acknowledges "unreservedly" the many positive aspects of modern science, and considers the quest for truth as essential to the Christian spirit, but he favours a broadening our narrow concept of reason and its application to include philosophical and theological experiences, not only as an aim in itself but so we may enter as a culture the dialogue with the other religions and cultures from a broader perspective:

Only thus do we become capable of that genuine dialogue of cultures and religions so urgently needed today. In the Western world it is widely held that only positivistic reason and the forms of philosophy based on it are universally valid. Yet the world's profoundly religious cultures see this exclusion of the divine from the universality of reason as an attack on their most profound convictions. A reason which is deaf to the divine and which relegates religion into the realm of subcultures is incapable of entering into the dialogue of cultures.

— Pope Benedict XVI's Regensburg Lecture

This objective of Pope Benedict XVI has so far not been widely reviewed.

== Theology of Joseph Ratzinger ==
=== Congregation for the Doctrine of the Faith ===
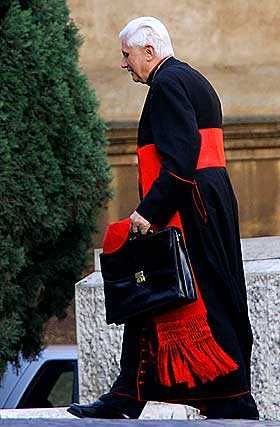

Ratzinger became known as a theologian through his position at the Congregation for the Doctrine of the Faith, which he headed from 1981 until his election to the Papacy. While a progressive during the Second Vatican Council, with developments in Germany after the council he "transformed himself from a young, liberal theologian into an uncompromising guardian of the orthodox". Only in the seventies did he feel that he had developed his own theological view. As head of doctrine after 1981, Ratzinger described himself as a "watchdog" over church teaching.

==== Karl Rahner's question ====
This "own theological view" has raised questions by critical liberal theologians, like Hans Küng and Karl Rahner.

It would be important for him to distinguish between Ratzinger the theologian, with his justified and maybe at times problematical positions, and Ratzinger the Prefect of the Congregation of Faith. Every Roman prelate has a right to his own theological views. But he should not use his Office to force them on others. This difference is important but of course also very difficult to carry out in practice.

— Karl Rahner

=== Divine revelation ===
It all began with the "drama of my dissertation", as he called it, a seemingly unimportant postdoctoral degree on Bonaventure, which he was almost denied because of serious reservations of some professors with his interpretation of divine revelation. Ratzinger held that God reveals and revealed himself in history and throughout history and not just once to the authors of the Bible.

I refer to what might be called Christian positivism. Christian belief is not merely concerned with the eternal, the “totally other”, … on the contrary, it is much more concerned with God in history, with God as man. By thus seeming to bridge the gulf between eternal and temporal, between visible and invisible, by making us meet God as man, the eternal as the temporal, as one of us, it knows itself as revelation

— Joseph Ratzinger, Introduction to Christianity, Seabury, New York, 1979, p. 27

==== Creation and Fall ====
In 1995, Ratzinger came out with the book In the Beginning...": A Catholic Understanding of the Story of Creation and the Fall. In it he explains that the world is not a chaos of mutually opposed forces; nor is it the dwelling of demonic powers from which human beings must protect themselves. Rather, all of this comes from one power, from God's eternal Reason, which became – in the Word – the power of creation. All of this comes from the same Word of God that we meet in the act of faith. The Bible was written to help us understand God's eternal Reason. The Holy Scripture in its entirety was not written from beginning to end like a novel or a textbook. It is, rather, the echo of God's history with his people. The theme of creation is not set down once for all in one place; rather, it accompanies Israel throughout its history, and, indeed, the whole Old Testament is a journeying with the Word of God. In this respect, the Old and New Testament belong together. Thus every individual part derives its meaning from the whole, and the whole derives its meaning from Christ.

==== Theology of covenant ====
In his theology of covenant, Ratzinger provides a unified interpretation of Scripture centered on the person and work of Jesus, with implications ranging from the Eucharist to the proper understanding of ecumenism. Benedict holds that Christology must be rooted in the covenantal theology of the New Testament, which is grounded in the unity of the entire Bible. In this covenantal theology, the Abrahamic covenant, as fulfilled by the new covenant, is seen as fundamental and enduring, whereas the Mosaic covenant is intervening (Rom. 5:20). The covenantal promises given to Abraham guarantee the continuity of salvation history, from the patriarchs to Jesus and the Church, which is open to Jews and Gentiles alike. The Last Supper served to seal the new covenant, and the Eucharist is an ongoing reenactment of this covenant renewal. Following the Letter to the Hebrews, Benedict describes Jesus death, along with the Eucharist, in which the blood of Jesus is offered to the Father, as the perfect realization of the Day of Atonement (cf. Heb. 9:11–14, 24–26).

==== Role of the Church ====
To comprehend God's ongoing revelation is why the Church is important at all ages. Benedict's view of the church, ecclesiology, places much emphasis on the Catholic Church and its institutions, as the instrument by which God's message manifests itself on Earth: a view of the Church's universal worldwide role which tends to resist local pressure to submit to external social trends in specific countries or cultures.

As such, like all his predecessors, he does not view the search for moral truth as a dialectic and incremental process, arguing that essential matters of faith and morals are universally true and therefore must be determined at the universal level: "the universal church ... takes precedence, ontologically and temporally, over the individual local churches." Accordingly, too, he was often seen as a key player in the centralization of the hierarchy under John Paul II.

==== Role of liturgy ====
Ratzinger comments as regards the Mass:

There is more and more a tendency today, to resolve the Christian religion completely into brotherly love, fellowship, and not to admit any direct love of God or adoration of God. ...It is not difficult to see ... how this at first sight very attractive conception fails to grasp not only the substance of Christianity but also that of true humanity. Brotherly love that aimed at self-sufficiency would become for this very reason the extreme egoism of self-assertion.

— Joseph Ratzinger (1979)

==== Continuity of Vatican II ====
This Ratzinger quote on the liturgical reform of the council is symbolic for his interpretation of Vatican II. Ratzinger speaks positively about the Vatican II council, but differentiates between the council and a spirit of the council which has nothing in common with its texts and resolutions. He believed that essential elements of the Council such as the spirit of liturgy still need to materialize. He has, however, stated in books and interviews that Vatican II did not represent a radical break; a new age, but a more pastoral reformulation of old truths earlier doctrine, but applied the teachings of the Apostles and Church Fathers to the contemporary world.

None of the Council Fathers saw an end of the Middle Ages or a revolution. It was viewed as a continuation of the reforms initiated by Pius X and systematically but gently continued by Pius XII.

— Joseph Kardinal Ratzinger, Aus meinem Leben, Erinnerungen, DVA, 1997, p.104

Indeed, the council documents quoted 205 times the allegedly conservative Pope Pius XII more than any other person. Benedict also spoke out against some post-conciliar innovations, especially liturgical novelties, which forget their purpose, and he continues to remind the faithful that the Council did not entirely do away with the former rite and many of its noble features.

In the pre-conclave Mass with the assembled cardinals in St. Peter's Basilica, he warned, "We are moving toward a dictatorship of relativism which does not recognize anything as definitive and has as its highest value one's own ego and one's own desires." In his Christmas address to the Roman Curia, he asked that Council be interpreted not with the "hermeneutic of discontinuity and rupture" but with the "hermeneutic of reform, of renewal in the continuity of the one subject-Church which the Lord has given to us."

=== Other theological opinions ===
Pope John Paul II and Ratzinger strongly opposed liberation theology as a political movement. Benedict acknowledged the good aspects of charismatic Catholicism while at the same time "providing some cautions."

== Dialogue with other faiths ==
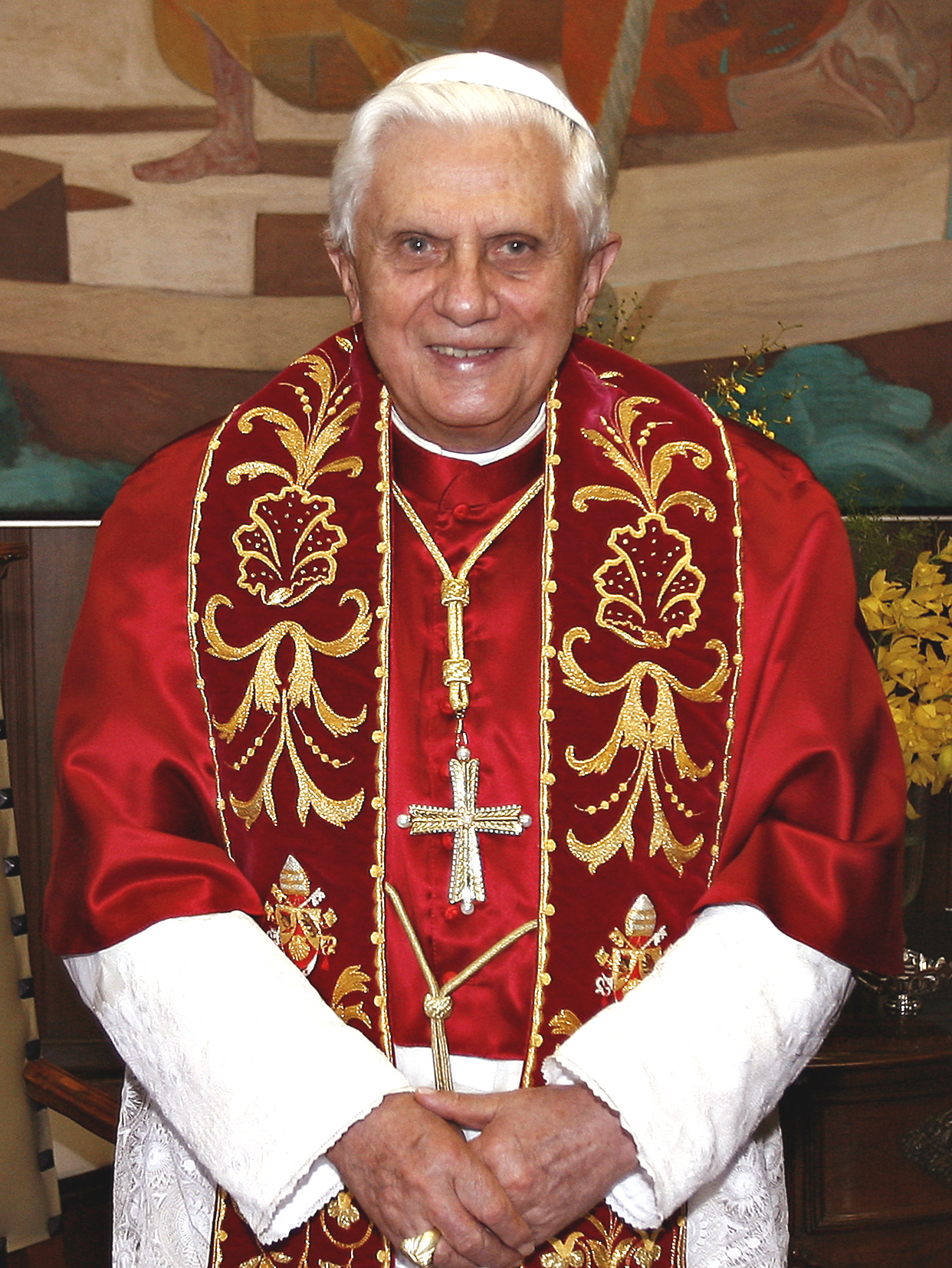

Cardinal Ratzinger's approach to ecumenical dialogue was fundamentally centered on his theology of covenant, as described in his work Many Religions–One Covenant: Israel, the Church, and the World (1999). In 2000, the Congregation for the Doctrine of the Faith issued a document entitled Dominus Iesus, which created much controversy. Some religious groups took offense at the document because it allegedly stated that "only in the Catholic Church is the eternal salvation." However this statement appears nowhere in the document. The document condemned "relativistic theories" of religious pluralism and described other faiths as "gravely deficient" in the means of salvation. The document was primarily aimed at opposing Catholic theologians like the acclaimed Jacques Dupuis, who argued that other religions could contain God-given means of salvation not found in the Church of Christ, but it offended many religious leaders. Jewish religious leaders boycotted several interfaith meetings in protest.

=== Other Christian denominations ===
In Dominus Jesus authored by Ratzinger in 2000, the famous "filioque" clause ("and the Son") was omitted. It had been a source of conflict between Roman Catholic and Eastern Orthodox Church for nearly a thousand years. In this Ratzinger reached a hand across the theological/historical chasm separating Eastern and Western Churches. Then as Pope in 2007, he approved a document which stated that Orthodox churches were defective because they did not recognize the primacy of the Pope, and that other Christian denominations were not true churches because they lacked apostolic succession; a move which sparked criticism from Orthodox and Protestant denominations.

=== Judaism ===
Pope Benedict created controversy when he said that the Church is waiting for the moment when Jews will "say yes to Christ." He went on to say, "We believe that. The fact remains, however, that our Christian conviction is that Christ is also the Messiah of Israel."

=== Islam ===
Benedict called for Christians "to open their arms and hearts" to Muslim immigrants and "to dialogue" with them on religious issues. He also called for peaceful talk with Muslims and was against the War in Iraq.

=== Buddhism ===
Critics remembered that in March 1997 Cardinal Ratzinger predicted that Buddhism would, over the coming century, replace Marxism as the main "enemy" of the Catholic Church. Some also criticized him for calling Buddhism an "autoerotic spirituality" that offered "transcendence without imposing concrete religious obligations", though that might be a mistranslation from the French auto-erotisme, which more properly translates to self-absorption, or narcissism. Also the quote did not address Buddhism as such, but rather about how Buddhism "appears" to those Europeans who are using it to obtain some type of self-satisfying spiritual experience.

== Social issues ==
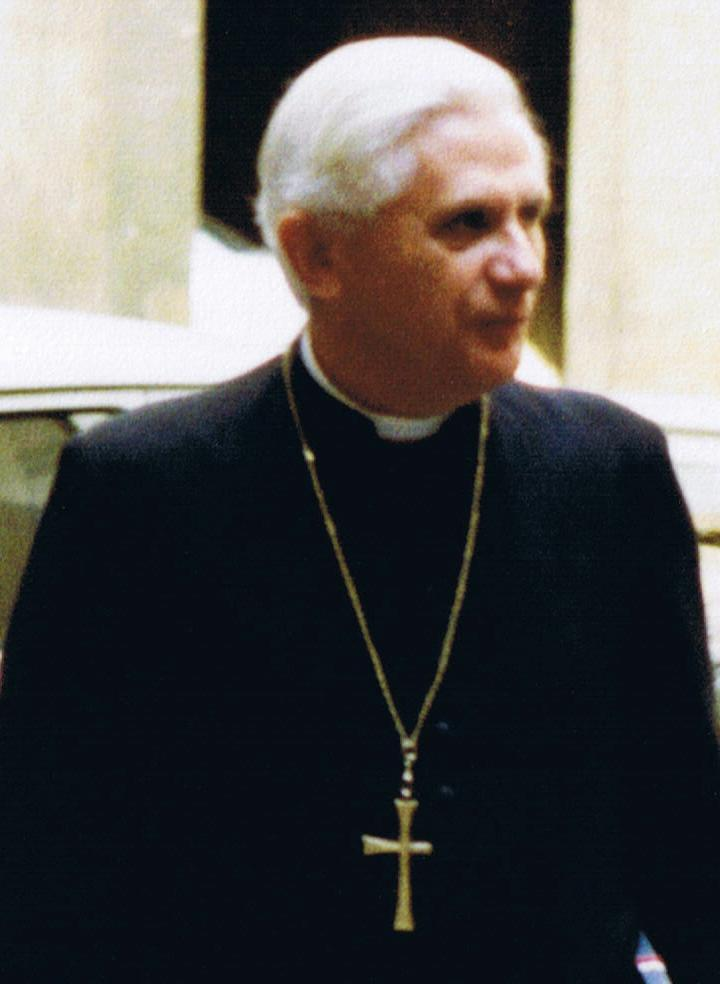

Before becoming Pope, Cardinal Ratzinger was a public facing figure in the Catholic Church and regularly commented on social issues. According to Hans Küng, "Ratzinger's predecessor, John Paul II, launched a program of ecclesiastical and political restoration, which went against the intentions of the Second Vatican Council. ...And Ratzinger was his most loyal assistant, even at an early juncture. One could call it a period of restoration of the pre-council Roman regime".

Benedict XVI's views were similar to those of his predecessor, Pope John Paul II, in maintaining the traditional positions on birth control, abortion, and homosexuality and promoting Catholic social teaching. In his biography journalist John L Allen, Jr. portrayed Cardinal Ratzinger as a figure who sometimes expressed more conservative views than Pope John Paul II. As Pope Benedict, he was noted for being less outspoken than predicted. Although opposed to the application of the death penalty, he stated, when Prefect of the CDF, that there may be a "legitimate diversity of opinion" on that matter. He also rejected that the divorced be allowed to remarry during their spouses' lifetime. In a 1994 letter to the bishops he said that those who do so are not in a state to receive communion. He also maintained that the Catholic Church does not possess the authority to ordain women to the priestly sacramental ministry.

During the 1980s, as prefect of the Congregation for the Doctrine of the Faith, he criticized liberation theologians and twice silenced proponent Leonardo Boff.

In The Spirit of the Liturgy in 2000, Ratzinger attacked Rock and Roll as "the expression of elemental passions" and described some rock concerts as becoming "a form of worship … in opposition to Christian worship." However, he is a great lover of classical and folk music, and included much new music in his recent pastoral visit to Cologne.

=== The dignity and inclusion of homosexuals ===
The Church under Pope John Paul II and Cardinal Ratzinger took the position based on the traditional Magisterium of the Catholic Church, that while confirming respect for individuals and showing "great respect for these people who also suffer", gay wedding services are not to be tolerated in the church and that Church facilities cannot be made available for them.

==== Homosexuality and LGBT rights ====
LGBT rights advocates widely criticized his 1986 letter to the Bishops of the Church, "On the Pastoral Care of Homosexual Persons", in which he stated that "although the particular inclination of the homosexual person is not a sin, it is a more or less strong tendency ordered toward an intrinsic moral evil; and thus the inclination itself must be seen as an objective disorder." However, then Cardinal Ratzinger also said: "It is deplorable that homosexual persons have been and are the object of violent malice in speech or in action. Such treatment deserves condemnation from the Church's pastors wherever it occurs."

In a separate letter dated September 30, 1985, Ratzinger reprimanded Seattle Archbishop Raymond Hunthausen for his unorthodox views on women, homosexuals, and doctrinal issues, stating, "The Archdiocese should withdraw all support from any group which does not unequivocally accept the teaching of the Magisterium concerning the intrinsic evil of homosexual activity." Archbishop Hunthausen was temporarily relieved of his authority.

==== Same-sex marriage and gay adoption ====
The Pontiff also defended traditional Catholic views on same-sex marriage; in 2004 he said to the Italian newspaper La Repubblica: "Above all, we must have great respect for these people who also suffer and who want to find their own way of correct living (also including those who wish to try to be gay and celibate). On the other hand, to create a legal form of a kind of homosexual marriage, in reality, does not help these people." The Pope later described gay marriage as "pseudo-matrimony" and declared that "the various forms of the dissolution of matrimony today, like free unions, trial marriages … by people of the same sex, are rather expressions of an anarchic freedom that wrongly passes for true freedom of man."

Benedict XVI was also against gay couples adopting children; he wrote a Vatican paper concerned with the adoption of children into same-sex couples. "Allowing children to be adopted by persons living in such unions would actually mean doing violence to these children, in the sense that their condition of dependency would be used to place them in an environment that is not conducive to their full human development."

=== AIDS ===
In 1988 a debate arose within the Catholic Church on whether or not condoms could be used, not as contraceptives, but as a means of preventing the spread of HIV/AIDS and other sexually transmitted diseases. In 1987, the U. S. Conference of Catholic Bishops issued a document suggesting that education on the use of condoms could be an acceptable part of an anti-AIDS program. In response, Cardinal Ratzinger stated that such an approach "would result in at least the facilitation of evil" – not merely its toleration.

=== Abortion and politics ===
During the 2004 presidential campaign In the United States, Cardinal Ratzinger stated that voters would be "cooperating in evil" if they voted for a political candidate precisely because of the candidate's permissive stand on legalized abortion or euthanasia. He further stated, however, that voting for these candidates for other reasons of commensurate gravity in spite of their stand concerning abortion/euthanasia was justifiable in principle, a teaching picked up on by the USCCB. But Ratzinger generated controversy by supporting the denial of Holy Communion to these politicians. He did add, however, that bishops should only withhold communion after meeting with, teaching and warning politicians first.

=== Treatment of animals ===
When he was asked about cruelty to animals in a 2002 interview, he said, "We can see that they are given into our care, that we cannot just do whatever we want with them. Animals, too, are God's creatures. …Certainly, a sort of industrial use of creatures, so that geese are fed in such a way as to produce as large a liver as possible, or hens live so packed together that they become just caricatures of birds, this degrading of living creatures to a commodity seems to me in fact to contradict the relationship of mutuality that comes across in the Bible." The church teaching laid out in the Catholic Catechism is that "animals are God’s creatures. He surrounds them with His providential care. By their mere existence they bless Him and give Him glory. Thus men owe them kindness. We should recall the gentleness with which saints like St. Francis of Assisi or St. Philip Neri treated animals. ...It is contrary to human dignity to cause animals to suffer or die needlessly."

=== Politics and other issues ===
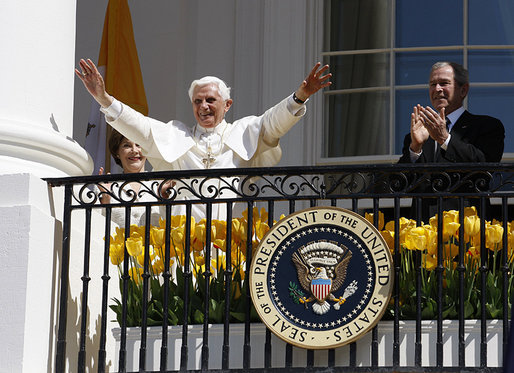
With George W. Bush at White House in 2008

"There were not sufficient reasons to unleash a war against Iraq," he said at a press conference in 2003. "To say nothing of the fact that, given the new weapons that make possible destructions that go beyond the combatant groups, today we should be asking ourselves if it is still licit to admit the very existence of a 'just war'."

According to CNN, Ratzinger called the Soviet Union "a shame of our time", and condemned unbridled capitalism by saying, "We must coordinate the free market with the sense of responsibility of one towards the other." He repeatedly criticized the materialization of life and the "greed society".

In the spring of 2005 Benedict opposed a referendum in Italy which aimed at liberalising a restrictive law about artificial insemination and embryonic stem cell research. This was the first direct intervention in Italian politics since the collapse of the Democrazia Cristiana party. The most active person inside the Church was Cardinal Camillo Ruini, but Benedict XVI gave him clear support.

=== Galileo affair ===
In 1990 Ratzinger commented on the Galileo affair, and quoted philosopher Paul Feyerabend as saying that the Church's verdict against Galileo had been "rational and just". Two years later, in 1992, Pope John Paul II expressed regret for how the Galileo affair was handled, and conceded that theologians of the time erred with their understanding that literal interpretation of scripture imposes physical understanding of the natural world. In January 2008 Benedict cancelled a visit to La Sapienza University in Rome, following a protest letter signed by sixty-seven academics which said he condoned the 1633 trial and conviction of Galileo for heresy.
