= Friedrich von Hügel =

Austrian Catholic writer (1852-1925)

- Born: Friedrich Maria Aloys Franz Karl von Hügel; 5 May 1852; Florence, Grand Duchy of Tuscany
- Died: 27 January 1925 (aged 72); London, United Kingdom
- Other name: Baron von Hügel
- Education: private
- Known for: Modernist Christian theologian
- Title: Freiherr (Baron)
- Spouse: Hon. Mary Catherine Herbert (m. 1873)
- Children: three daughters: Gertrude, Hildegarde and Thekla

Friedrich von Hügel (born Friedrich Maria Aloys Franz Karl Freiherr von Hügel, usually known as Baron von Hügel; 5 May 1852 – 27 January 1925) was an influential Austrian Catholic layman, religious writer, and Christian apologist. Although classified with Modernists due to his friendships with Alfred Loisy and George Tyrrell, von Hügel rejected the Modernist theory of belief.

== Life and work ==
Friedrich von Hügel was born in Florence, in 1852, to Charles von Hügel, who was serving as Austrian ambassador to the Grand Duchy of Tuscany, and a Scottish mother, Elizabeth Farquharson, who was a convert to Catholicism. The young Friedrich was educated privately, and in 1867 moved with his family to England, when he was fifteen, remaining there for the rest of his life. It has been suggested that Count Felix Sumarokov-Elston, an ataman of the Kuban Cossacks, was his elder half-brother; but as the Count was born in 1820 this is most unlikely, and the Count is more likely to have been his uncle, the son of Hügel's grandfather.

In 1873 he married Lady Mary Catherine Herbert (1849–1935), daughter of the statesman Sidney Herbert, 1st Baron Herbert of Lea, by Elizabeth Ash à Court-Repington, an ardent convert to Roman Catholicism and a philanthropist. Mary, like Hügel's mother and her own, was also a convert. The couple had three daughters: Gertrude (1877–1915), Hildegarde (1879–1926), and Thekla (1886–1970), who became a Carmelite nun. Hügel remained an Austrian citizen until he found himself to be a "hostile alien" after Britain declared war on Austria-Hungary in August 1914. He applied for naturalisation and received it in December of the same year.

Hügel was a Baron of the Holy Roman Empire, an inherited title, and a frequent visitor to Rome. A self-taught biblical scholar, he was fluent in French, German, and Italian, as well as his adopted English. A master of many subjects, he never held office in the church, nor any academic post, nor did he ever earn a university degree. However, he is often mentioned alongside John Henry Newman as one of the most influential Roman Catholic thinkers of his day. The scope of his learning was impressive, and the list of his correspondents reads like a "who's who" of nineteenth- and early twentieth-century European religious leadership (for example, Louis Duchesne, Alfred Loisy, Germain Morin, Maurice Blondel, Henri Brémond, John Henry Newman, William George Ward, Wilfrid Philip Ward, Lord Halifax, Cuthbert Butler, Claude Montefiore, George Tyrrell, Maude Petre, Evelyn Underhill, Antonio Fogazzaro, Ernesto Buonaiuti, Rudolf Christoph Eucken, Hans Vaihinger, Franz Xaver Kraus, and Ernst Troeltsch). In Italy, Hügel frequently met two future popes, Achille Ratti and Eugenio Pacelli, later Pius XI and Pius XII. In Milan in 1901 Ratti helped him with his research at the Ambrosiana for The Mystical Element of Religion. Hügel did much to bring the work of the philosophers Eucken and Troeltsch to the attention of the English-speaking public, despite the hostility during and after the First World War to all things German.

=== Modernism ===
Baron von Hügel was deeply engaged in theological discussions with a wide group of scholars associated with the turn-of-the-century Modernist controversy. "He shared with other modernists a belief that science had raised new questions for religious faith and that undermined any naïve suppositions that believers could rely purely on dogmatic authority as a source of truth." His scholarly concerns included the relationship of Christianity to history, ecumenism, mysticism, the philosophy of religion, and the rejection of much of the immanentism in nineteenth-century theology. Von Hügel supported Alfred Loisy in his troubles with ecclesiastical authorities because he understood Loisy's biblical criticism as valid historical apologetics for the Catholic Church. He was a close friend of George Tyrrell, and the two would exchange and proof each other's writing. Under Pope Pius X, prompted by conservatives such as Cardinal Merry del Val y Zulueta, there was a backlash against many of the Modernist thinkers, and Hügel attempted to negotiate a middle way of restraint, while remaining true to the principles of intellectual rigour and free enquiry.

When the University of Oxford granted him an honorary Doctor of Divinity degree in 1920, it was the first time since the Reformation that a Roman Catholic had been so honoured by that university. The University of St Andrews, where the Hügel archives are now located, had awarded him an honorary degree in 1914.

Hügel died in 1925. He was buried, beside his mother and sister, with the Benedictines of Downside, beside the abbey. His tombstone in an English country churchyard bears the simple inscription: "Whom have I in heaven but Thee?"

== The Mystical Element of Religion ==
Friedrich von Hügel's major work was The Mystical Element of Religion as Studied in St. Catherine of Genoa and Her Friends (1908). Writing in The Manchester Guardian after Hügel's death, William Temple gave his judgement of its value:

It is quite arguable that this is the most important theological work written in the English language during the last half-century. Its greatness, like all true greatness in this field, consists in its combination of qualities usually found in separation from each other. It is a masterpiece of detailed critical study, yet it is a massive presentation of fundamental principle. It is a penetrating piece of psychological analysis, while it is also a great achievement in constructive philosophy. The most striking section of it — the introduction — has so deeply permeated the thought of our time that its leading conception has become a commonplace among many who have never read the book, or even who have never heard of it. This leading conception is, of course, the necessity of three elements in any religion which is to be both full and living — the mystical, the intellectual, the institutional. His statement of the necessity of each of these, and of the consequent need to harmonize and balance them, is unanswerable.

Hügel's The Mystical Element of Religion is a critical but largely appreciative philosophy of mysticism. Yet, in many ways throughout this work von Hügel counsels the reader of mysticism's potential dangers. The mystical impulse is but one of the three elements that together with the other two constitutes the rich complexity of existence. Hügel cautions: "...mysticism would never be the whole of religion; it would become a dangerous error the very moment it claimed to be this whole; but, at the same time, it would be an element essential to religion in the long run and upon the whole, although it would… possess its own dangers, its own besetting sins, as indeed also the primitive, naïve type of religion possesses its own different dangers and different besetting sins."

== The three elements ==
Hügel's "three elements of religion" are his most enduring contribution to theological thinking. The human soul, the movements of western civilisation, and the phenomena of religion itself he characterised by these three elements: the historical/institutional element, the intellectual/speculative element, and the mystical/experiential element. This typology provided for him an understanding of the balance, tension, and 'friction' that exists in religious thinking and in the complexity of reality and existence. It is an organising paradigm that remained central to his project. The effort to hold these sometimes disparate dimensions together is structurally and theologically dominant throughout his writing. His friend George Tyrrell observed, "All life, according to [Hügel] consists in a patient struggle with irreconcilables—a progressive unifying of parts that will never fit perfectly."

== Hügel and Yeats ==
William Butler Yeats addressed Friedrich von Hügel in the last stanza of "Vacillation":

Must we part, Von Hügel, though much alike, for we

Accept the miracles of the saints and honour sanctity?
The body of Saint Teresa lies undecayed in tomb,
Bathed in miraculous oil, sweet odours from it come,
Healing from its lettered slab. Those self-same hands perchance
Eternalised the body of a modern saint that once
Had scooped out Pharaoh's mummy. I – though heart might find relief
Did I become a Christian man and choose for my belief
What seems most welcome in the tomb – play a predestined part.
Homer is my example and his unchristened heart.
The lion and the honeycomb, what has Scripture said?

So get you gone, Von Hügel, though with blessings on your head.

== Hügel and Flannery O'Connor ==
In The Habit of Being: Letters of Flannery O'Connor, published posthumously in 1979, O'Connor refers often to von Hügel, especially in writing to a correspondent in the process of conversion to Catholicism. A Subversive Gospel by Michael Bruner also examines her Catholicism and Hügel's influence.

== Legacy ==
With a deep commitment to the life of prayer, von Hügel was an authority on the great mystical writers, particularly of the pre-Reformation period, and sympathetic to the emotional and spiritual burdens of humanity, so that he was sought out by many as a counsellor, guide, and spiritual mentor. His authority as a spiritual writer has endured through the posthumous publication of many of his letters: Selected Letters, 1896–1924, 1927, Letters from Baron Friedrich von Hügel to a Niece, 1928, and Spiritual Counsels and Letters of Baron Friedrich von Hügel, 1964.

The Von Hügel Institute, a research centre for the study of Christianity and society at St Edmund's College, Cambridge, was founded in 1987, and is named in honour of Friedrich's brother, Anatole von Hügel, the first director of the Museum of Archaeology and Anthropology, University of Cambridge.

A plaque was erected in 1968 by the Greater London Council outside his former home at 4 Holford Road, Hampstead, London, NW3 1AD, London Borough of Camden.

== Works ==
In addition to extensive correspondence, his published works include:

- The Mystical Element of Religion: as studied in Saint Catherine of Genoa and her friends, 2 vols, (1908, revised 1923: Vol. I; Vol. II )
- Eternal Life (1912)
- The German Soul (1916)
- Essays and Addresses on the Philosophy of Religion (Vol. I 1921; Vol II 1926)
- Friedrich von Hügel (1928). Letters from Baron Friedrich von Hügel to a Niece. J. M. Dent & Sons.
- Some Notes on the Petrine Claims, Sheed & Ward, 1930.
- The Reality of God and Religion and Agnosticism (1931). This last book contains two works that von Hügel left unfinished at his death: The Reality of God, which was to have been the Gifford Lectures of 1924–1925 and 1925–1926 at Edinburgh University, and Religion and Agnosticism, a study of the religious opinions and writings of Sir Alfred Comyn Lyall which was begun in 1912 and laid aside in 1915 (though retouched here and there later).
