= Anti-modernism =

Anti-modernism may refer to:

- Modernism#Criticism of late modernity
- Anti-modernization
- Anti-Modernism in the Catholic church
  - Oath Against Modernism, 1910

== See also ==
- Modernism (disambiguation)
