= George Tyrrell =

Irish Jesuit priest (1861–1909)

The Reverend George Tyrrell SJ
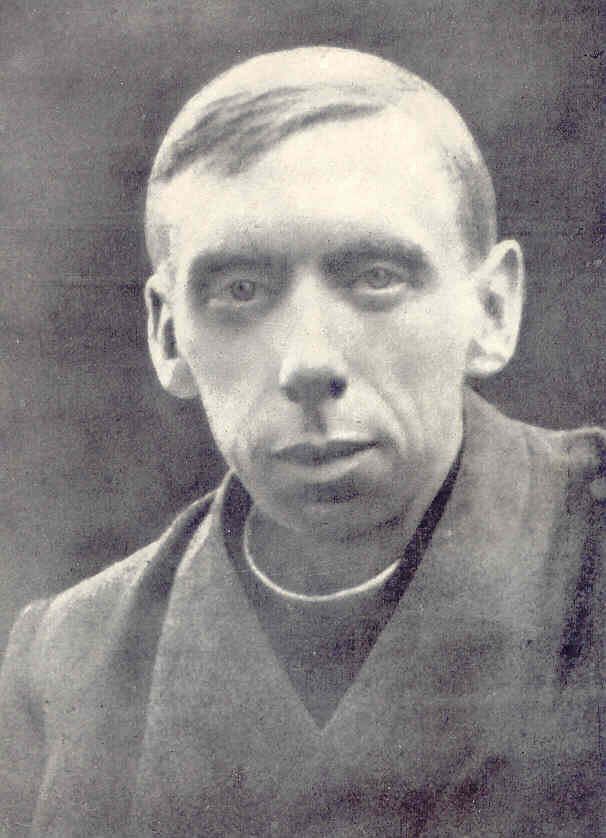

Orders
- Ordination: 1891

Personal details
- Born: 6 February 1861 Dublin, United Kingdom of Great Britain and Ireland
- Died: 15 July 1909 (aged 48) Storrington, United Kingdom of Great Britain and Ireland
- Denomination: Roman Catholic, Latin Church
- Occupation: Priest; theologian; scholar

George Tyrrell SJ (6 February 1861 – 15 July 1909) was an Anglo-Irish Catholic priest and a controversial theologian and scholar. A convert from Anglicanism, Tyrrell joined the Jesuit order in 1880 and was ordained as a priest in 1891. He was a prolific writer whose efforts to adapt and reinterpret Catholic teachings in light of modern science and culture made him a central figure in the controversy over modernism in the Catholic Church that flared up towards the end of the 19th century. Tyrrell rejected the neo-scholastic thinking then dominant among the Jesuits and in the Vatican, insisting that the Church's response to the problems faced by modern believers could not be merely to reiterate the theological and philosophical doctrines systematized in the 13th century by Thomas Aquinas.

Tyrrell enjoyed a high reputation as a liberal Catholic author in the late 1890s, but he then came into conflict with his Jesuit superiors and with the Vatican authorities. The anti-modernist campaign launched by Pope Pius X led to Tyrrell's expulsion from the Jesuits in 1906. After Pius condemned modernism in the encyclical Pascendi Dominici gregis (1907), Tyrrell wrote two letters to the London Times rejecting its reasoning and conclusions. This led to his excommunication by the Bishop of Southwark, Peter Amigo. Tyrrell never recanted his modernist opinions, but he did not abandon the Catholic Church and received the Catholic last rites just before his death in 1909.

== Early life ==
George Tyrrell was born on 6 February 1861 in the city of Dublin. His father William Tyrrell, a journalist and sub-editor of the Dublin Evening Mail, had died shortly before George's birth. The Tyrrells belonged to the Protestant Ascendancy in Ireland and were intellectually distinguished. George was a first cousin of the classicist Robert Yelverton Tyrrell, who became Regius Professor of Greek at Trinity College, in the University of Dublin.

The family had to move repeatedly due to the financial straits in which it fell after the father's death. George's elder brother "Willie", although crippled in infancy by a fracture of the spine and afflicted by persistent ill health, was a brilliant student at Rathmines School and went on to an outstanding career as a classicist at Trinity College, before his early death in 1876. George himself became deaf in the right ear following a childhood accident.

The headmaster of Rathmines, Dr Benson, agreed to remit George's fees in light of the success of his brother Willie, and George entered the school in 1869. His performance was poor, however, and his mother sent him as a boarder to Midleton College, where he was subjected to a tougher discipline. Due to her difficulties affording the fees, George soon returned to Rathmines, where in 1876 he completed the sixth form at the bottom of his class. He then studied privately in the hopes of earning a scholarship to study Hebrew at Trinity College, but he failed the required examination twice. He gained admission to Trinity in 1878 but, without a scholarship, his mother could not afford to send him there.

More interested in religion than in academic work, the young Tyrrell began worshipping at All Saints Church, Grangegorman, where he was exposed to a moderate high church Anglicanism. Around 1877 he met Robert Dolling, an Anglo-Catholic priest and a Christian socialist who would go one to exert a strong influence on Tyrell. With Dolling's encouragement, Tyrrell began to go to confession at the Catholic St Mary's Church and to attend mass at the Gardiner Street Church, run by the Jesuits, while continuing to take Anglican communion at Grangegorman.

In August 1878, Tyrrell took a teaching post at Wexford High School, but he was unhappy with the school's uncompromising Protestantism and did not return after the Christmas break. The rector of Grangegorman, Dr Maturin, confronted Tyrrell about his attendance at Catholic masses, and Tyrrell then decided to accept an invitation from Dolling to join him in London, where Dolling was active in Saint Martin's League, an Anglican devotional society that worked with local postmen.

In London, Tyrrell planned to earn his living by collaborating with the work of the St Martin's League, under the supervision of Dolling and of Father Alexander Mackonochie, the vicar of St Alban's Church, Holborn. Tyrrell, however, was unimpressed by what he saw as the insincere ritualism practiced at St Alban's. On Palm Sunday, he wandered into St Etheldreda's, a Catholic church on Ely Place, and was powerfully struck by the Catholic Mass. Of this experience he later wrote in his autobiography: "Here was the old business, being carried on by the old firm, in the old ways; here was continuity, that took one back to the catacombs."

== Jesuit ==
Tyrrell soon converted and was received into the Catholic Church in 1879. Feeling called to the priesthood and inspired by a recent historical novel by popular French writer Paul Féval that presented the Society of Jesus (the Jesuits) in a heroic light, Tyrrell applied to join the Society, but the provincial superior advised him to wait a year. He spent the interim teaching at Jesuit schools in Cyprus and Malta. He joined the Jesuits in 1880 and was sent to the novitiate at Manresa House, in Roehampton. As early as 1882, his novice master suggested that Tyrrell withdraw from the Jesuits due to "mental indocility" and dissatisfaction with a number of Jesuit customs, approaches, and practices. Tyrrell was, however, allowed to remain. He later stated that he believed he was more inclined to the Benedictine spirituality.

After taking his first vows, Tyrrell was sent to Stonyhurst College to study philosophy as the first stage in his Jesuit formation. He then returned to the Jesuit school in Malta, where he spent three years teaching, before being sent to St Beuno's College, in Wales, to take up his theological studies. He was ordained to the priesthood in 1891. After a brief period of pastoral work in Lancashire, Tyrrell returned to Roehampton for his Tertianship. In 1893, he lived briefly at the Jesuit mission house in Oxford, before taking up pastoral work at St Helens, Merseyside, where he was reportedly happiest during his time as a Jesuit. A little over a year later, he was sent to teach philosophy at Stonyhurst. Tyrrell then began to have conflicts with his superiors over the traditional Jesuit approach to teaching philosophy.

Pope Leo XIII's 1879 encyclical Aeterni Patris had promoted the teaching of a Scholastic philosophy, based on the works of Saint Thomas Aquinas, in Catholic schools and seminaries. Tyrrell admired Aquinas, but he rejected the Scholastic approach as inadequate. He became convinced that the Jesuits were not teaching the philosophy of Aquinas himself, but rather the narrow interpretation of it introduced centuries later by Jesuit theologian Francisco Suárez (see Neo-scholasticism).

In 1896, Tyrrell was transferred to the Jesuit house on Farm Street, in London. There Tyrrell discovered the work of Maurice Blondel. He was also influenced by Alfred Loisy's biblical scholarship. Tyrrell first met Friedrich von Hügel in October 1897 and they became close friends. Part of Tyrrell's work while at Farm Street was writing articles for the Jesuit periodical The Month. He had the occasion to review some works by Wilfrid Ward, and for a time, came to share Ward's views of a moderate Catholic liberalism. Tyrrell's gifts of literary expression were showcased in two collections of religious meditations, Nova et vetera (1897) and Hard Sayings (1898). That work earned him a wide readership and a reputation as a liberal Catholic thinker in the mould of John Henry Newman.

In 1899, Ward invited Tyrrell to join the "Synthetic Society", which counted among its members several of the leading religious and philosophical thinkers in Britain, including Friedrich von Hügel, Arthur Balfour, Charles Gore, Edward Talbot, Richard Haldane, and Henry Sidgwick. The Society met every month at the Carlton Club. His participation in it reinforced Tyrrell's confidence that Catholics should participate in the debates of the broader intellectual community.

== Modernist controversy ==
Between 1891 and 1906, Tyrrell published more than twenty articles in Catholic periodicals, many of them in the United States. In "The relation of theology to devotion", which appeared in The Month in 1899, Tyrrell argued for the primacy of devotion over the intellectual abstractions of philosophy and theology. He insisted that philosophy and theology may clarify the misunderstandings that arise from a naïve devotion, but that

God has revealed himself [...] not to the theologian or the philosopher, but to babes, to fishermen, to peasants [...] and therefore He has spoken their language, leaving it to the others to translate it (at their own risk) into forms more aceptable to their taste.

In External Religion: Its Use and Abuse (1899), Tyrrell argued that all of the structures and sacraments of the Church exist only to help reproduce the life of Jesus in the lives of his followers. According to the text, Catholics should remember "that the Christ and the religion outside of them is but a means to wake up the Christ and the religion that is latent in them." Tyrrell was critical both of Catholic neo-Scholasticism and of the liberal Protestant scholarship of the day. In an often quoted attack on Adolf von Harnack's approach to Biblical criticism, Tyrrell wrote that "the Christ that Harnack sees, looking back through nineteen centuries of 'Catholic darkness', is only the reflection of a Liberal Protestant face, seen at the bottom of a deep well." On the other hand, Tyrrell advocated "the right of each age to adjust the historico-philosophical expression of Christianity to contemporary certainties, and thus to put an end to this utterly needless conflict between faith and science which is a mere theological bogey." In Tyrrell's view, the pope should not act as an autocrat but a "spokesman for the mind of the Holy Spirit in the Church". According to Tyrrell, the dogmas of the church were unchangeable because they were imposed authoritatively as the Word of God, not as a conclusion of theological reflection. In other words, the theological form of dogma was as expression of the dogma, not the dogma itself. Tyrrell befriended other Catholic intellectuals who shared his concerns about reconciling Church doctrine with modern thought, including the English nun Maude Petre and the French Jesuit priest Henri Brémond.

Tyrrell's open conflict with the Catholic authorities was triggered by his article "A Perverted Devotion", published in the Weekly Register in 1899, in which he criticized the literalistic preachings on hell by two Redemptorist authors. Given "the essential incapacity of finite mind to seize the absolute end which governs and moves everything towards itself", Tyrrell recognized that some subjects were matters of "faith and mystery". He "preferred to admit that the Christian doctrine of hell as simply a very great mystery, one difficult to reconcile with any just appreciation of the concept of an all-loving God". The English Jesuit Herbert Thurston had reviewed and authorized the article for publication, but it aroused controversy in Rome and was later found to be "offensive to pious ears" by Father General Luis Martín. Tyrrell was then assigned to a small Jesuit residence in Richmond, North Yorkshire, which he jokingly called domus impossibilium nostrorum ("the house of our impossibles"). There Tyrrell enjoyed the peace and quiet afforded by his lack of responsibilities, the distance from London, and the policy of the Jesuit in charge of the residence, Fr. Farmer, of not interfering with Tyrrell's personal activities.

Between 1900 and 1904, Tyrrell published several pseudonymous works that emphasized the primacy of the human will over the intellect in matters of religion. Tyrrell saw the capacity of the will to be united with God as the center of the religious life, and expressed concern that the rationalistic approach to religious questions favored by the neo-Scholastics did not meet the pastoral needs of modern Catholics. In those works, Tyrrell also described the Catholic Church as fallible, but also as a vehicle to the immanent Spirit.

== Expulsion and excommunication ==
Tyrrel's Jesuit superiors ordered him in 1906 to repudiate his modernist theses. Tyrrell refused to do so and was consequently dismissed from the Jesuits by Father General Martín, acting under the instructions of Pope Pius X. Tyrrell hoped that he might still be allowed to act as a secular priest, but his position became untenable after the explicit condemnations of modernism by Pius X in the decree Lamentabili sane exitu of July 1907 and in the encyclical Pascendi Dominici gregis of September 1907. Tyrrell wrote two letters to The Times in which he strongly criticized that encyclical. According to Tyrrell,

The whole of this vast controversial structure is poised by a most ingenious, logical tour de force on the apex of a science-theory and psychology that are as strange as astrology to the modern mind, and are practically unknown outside Seminary walls, save to the historian of philosophy. Touch this science-theory, and the whole argument is in ruins.

Tyrrell argued that Pascendi illegitimately equated Catholic doctrine with a specific reading of Scholasticism, thus reflecting a wholly naïve view of the historical development of the Church. While Pascendi intended to show that the "modernist" is not a Catholic, Tyrrell argued that it succeeded only in showing that he is not a Scholastic. For this public rejection of Pascendi, Tyrrell was deprived of the sacraments in what Peter Amigo, the Bishop of Southwark, characterized as "a minor excommunication". Unlike his contemporary the French modernist theologian Alfred Loisy, Tyrrell was never tried by the Congregation of Index or by the Holy Office. His case was always in the hands of the Cardinal Secretary of State, Rafael Merry del Val, who worked closely with Bishop Amigo. Loisy was declared by the Vatican in 1908 to be vitandus (i.e., to be shunned by Catholics), but this was never the case of Tyrrell.

In The Program of Modernism (1907), Tyrrell embraced the label of "modernist" and argued that, far from being a straightforward deduction from revelation and primitive Christianity, the scholasticism upheld by Pius X had been a synthesis of the Christian faith with the culture of the late Middle Ages, and therefore a sort of "modernism" of the 13th century. In 1908, Cardinal Désiré-Joseph Mercier, the Archbishop of Mechelen in Belgium, published a Lenten pastoral letter in which he explained and defended the papal condemnations of modernism, while alleging that those errors had not penetrated the Belgian church. The only individual whom Mercier named as an exponent of the condemned doctrines was Tyrrell. This motivated Tyrrell to respond to Mercier in a long public letter that appeared under the title Medievalism, in which he again argued that the Catholic authorities were ignoring the historical development of the Catholic church and its doctrines, reducing the Catholic faith to a rigid system of neo-scholastic theology and philosophy that many modern believers could not assent to in good conscience.

== Death and legacy ==
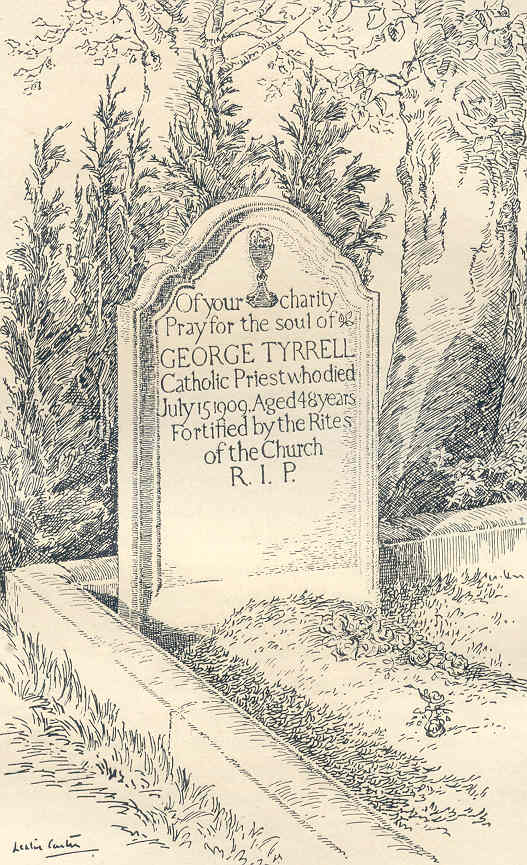
The stone erected at the grave of George Tyrrell

Tyrrell's last two years were spent mainly in Storrington. He suffered from chronic nephritis (known by physicians at the time as "Bright's disease") and became increasingly ill. He was given extreme unction on his deathbed in 1909, but as he refused to abjure his modernist views he was denied burial in a Catholic cemetery. A priest, his friend Henri Brémond, was present at the burial and made a sign of the cross over Tyrrell's grave, which resulted in Bishop Amigo temporarily suspending Fr. Brémond a divinis.

In a letter to Arthur Boutwood, Tyrrell had said shortly before his death that "my own work —which I regard as done— has been to raise a question which I have failed to answer", namely the meaning of Christianity in the modern world. Tyrrell was convinced that Christianity had to face up to the challenges of biblical criticism and natural science, but he was personally ill-equipped to deal with them at a deep intellectual level. His biographer Nicholas Sagovsky considers that Tyrrell's talents lay primarily in the "literary communication of religious ideas". According to Sagovsky, many of the reforms that Tyrrell advocated were eventually adopted by the Catholic Church in the years following the Second Vatican Council (1962–1965), but "it is doubtful whether the institutional Roman Catholic church in any age could have contained a spiritual writer so gifted, so reckless, and so provocative".

== Selected writings ==
- Nova et Vetera: Informal Meditations, 1897
- Hard Sayings: A Selection of Meditations and Studies, Longmans, Green & Co., 1898
- External Religion: Its Use and Abuse, B. Herder, 1899
- The Faith of the Millions 1901
- Lex Orandi: or, Prayer & Creed, Longmans, Green & Co., 1903
- Lex Credendi: A Sequel to Lex Orandi, Longmans, Green & Co., 1906
- Through Scylla and Charybdis: or, The Old Theology and the New, Longmans, Green & Co., 1907
- A Much-Abused Letter, Longmans, Green, and Co., 1907
- Medievalism: A Reply to Cardinal Mercier, Longmans, Green, and Co. 1908
- The Church and the Future, The Priory Press, 1910
- Christianity at the Cross-Roads, Longmans, Green and Co., 1910
- Autobiography and Life of George Tyrrell, Edward Arnold, 1912
- Essays on Faith and Immortality, Edward Arnold, 1914

Articles

- "The Clergy and the Social Problem," The American Catholic Quarterly Review, Vol. XXII, 1897.
- "The Old Faith and the New Woman", The American Catholic Quarterly Review, Vol. XXII, 1897.
- "The Church and Scholasticism", The American Catholic Quarterly Review, Vol. XXIII, 1898.
