= Modernism in the Catholic Church =

Attempts to reconcile Catholicism with modern culture

Modernism in the Catholic Church is a theological tendency that seeks to reconcile Catholic Doctrine with modern philosophy, historical criticism, and contemporary intellectual thought, particularly through the fundamental reinterpretation of divine revelation, Sacred Tradition, and the belief of evolution of dogma. It became the subject of a major theological controversy in the late 19th and early 20th centuries, culminating in its condemnation by Pope Pius X in the 1907 encyclical Pascendi dominici gregis, describing it the "synthesis of all heresies"

The term modernism — was generally used by its critics rather than by adherents of positions associated with it. Although modernists didn't constitute a unified movement, they shared an interest in reconsidering Catholic teaching in light of contemporary scholarship and philosophy. The modernists approaches varied widely, particularly concerning the interpretation of Scripture, the nature of divine revelation, and the evolution of dogma. The controversy extended beyond Catholicism, with Protestant thelogians and scholars such as Paul Sabatier and Heinrich Julius Holtzmann participating in related intellectual debates.

Under Pope Pius X, the Holy Office promulgated the decree Lamentabili sane exitu in 1907, condemning 65 propositions concerning biblical interpretation and the history of dogma. The subsequent encyclical Pascendi dominici gregis presented modernism as a theological system characterized by agnosticism, religious immanentism, and the evolution of dogma. The condemnations were followed by severe disciplinary measures, including restrictions on teaching and publications, the excommunication of prominent modernists, and the introduction of the Oath Against Modernism in 1910.

== Dimensions of the controversy over modernism ==
Although the so-called modernists did not form a uniform movement, they responded to a common grouping of religious problems which transcended Catholicism alone around 1900: first of all the problem of historicism, which seemed to render all historical forms of faith and tradition relative; secondly, through the reception of modern philosophers like Immanuel Kant, Maurice Blondel, and Henri Bergson, the neo-scholastic philosophical and theological framework set up by Pope Leo XIII had become fragile. The assertion that objective truth is received subjectively is fundamental for the entire controversy. This focus on the religious subject engendered a renewed interest in mysticism, sanctity and religious experience in general. The aversion to religious "extrinsicism" also led to a new hermeneutics for doctrinal definitions which were seen as secondary formulations of an antecedent (immanent) religious experience (George Tyrrell; cfr. also the Christian personalism of Lucien Laberthonnière).

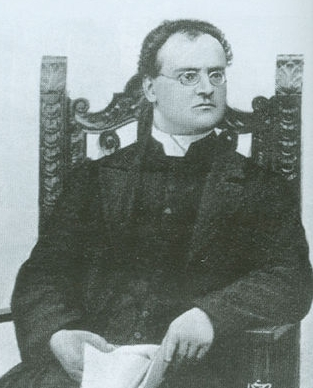
Romolo Murri (1870–1944)

The controversy was not restricted to the field of philosophy and theology. On the level of politics, Christian Democrats like the layman Marc Sangnier in France and the priest Romolo Murri in Italy, but also the left wing of the Centre Party and the Christian Unions in Germany, opted for a political agenda which was no longer completely controlled by the hierarchy. Pope Pius X reacted by excommunicating Murri in 1909, by dissolving Sangnier's Le Sillon movement in 1910, and by issuing the encyclical Singulari quadam in 1912 which clearly favoured the German Catholic workers' associations over and against the Christian Unions. Furthermore, antimodernists like Albert Maria Weiss OP, and the Swiss Caspar Decurtins, which were both favoured by Pius X, would even find "literary modernism" on the field of the Catholic belles-lettres which did not meet their standards of orthodoxy.

In the eyes of the antimodernist reaction, the "modernists" were a uniform and secret sect within the Church. From a historical perspective, one can discern networks of personal contacts between "modernists", especially around Friedrich von Hügel and Paul Sabatier. On the other hand, there was a great diversity of opinions within the "movement", from people ending up in rationalism (e.g. Marcel Hébert, Albert Houtin, Alfred Loisy, Salvatore Minocchi, and Joseph Turmel) to a mild religious reformism, even including neo-scholastic theologians like Romolo Murri. This perception of a broad movement from left to right was already shaped by the protagonists themselves.

== Terminology ==
The term Liberal Catholicism originally designated a current of thought within the Catholic Church that was influential in the 19th century, particularly in France, that aimed to reconcile the church with liberal democracy. It was largely identified with French political theorists such as Felicité Robert de Lamennais, Henri Lacordaire, and Charles Forbes René de Montalembert. In the second half of the 19th century the term was also applied to theologians and intellectuals like Ignaz von Döllinger, St. George Jackson Mivart, John Zahm, and Franz Xaver Kraus who wanted to reconcile the Catholic faith with the standards of modern science and society in general.

In 1881, the Belgian economist Charles Périn, a conservative Catholic layman, published a volume titled Le modernisme dans l'église d'après les lettres inédites de La Mennais ("Modernism in the Church according to the unpublished letters of La Mennais"). Périn was the first author to use the term modernism in a Catholic context – before him the Dutch Calvinist Abraham Kuyper had attacked the rationalist German theology of the Protestant Tübingen School as "modernism" (Het modernisme een fata morgana op christelijk gebied, 1871). For Périn, 'modernism' was a label for the attempts of Liberal Catholics to reconcile Catholicism with the ideals of the French Revolution and of democracy in general. He saw a danger that humanitarian tendencies in secular society would be received within the Catholic Church. This "social" definition of Catholic modernism would be taken up again later by Integralism. Périn's usage of the term modernism was accepted by the Roman journal of the Jesuits, the semi-official Civiltà Cattolica, which added the aspect of an exaggerated trust in modern science to this concept. When five exegetical books of the French theologian Alfred Loisy were placed on the Index of Forbidden Books in December 1903, the Holy See's official paper L'Osservatore Romano distinguished between "modernity" and "modernism", which entailed heresy in religion, revolution in politics, and error in philosophy. The term modernism now began to replace older labels like 'Liberal Catholicism' or (especially in Germany) 'Reform Catholicism'.

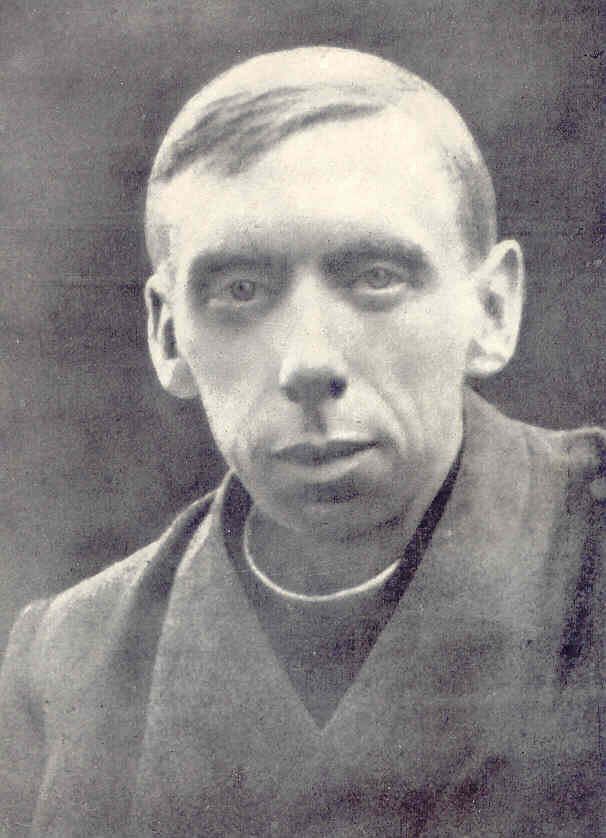
George Tyrrell (1861–1909)

The connection between 'Liberal Catholicism' and 'modernism' has been subject to controversial discussion. In 1979, Thomas Michael Loome stressed the continuity between the two and talked of a "vertical dimension" of the modernist controversy. This "invention of tradition" was criticized – amongst others – by Nicholas Lash. It is clear, however, that the Joint Pastoral of the English episcopate against "Liberal Catholicism" (December 1900) did not only react on St. George Jackson Mivart, but also on the writings of the later "modernist" George Tyrrell. The letter had been prepared in Rome and was inspired by Rafael Merry del Val who became Tyrrell's chief opponent under Pius X. Furthermore, "modernists" like Tyrrell compared their own difficulties after the publication of Pascendi with the difficulties of "liberal Catholics" like Ignaz von Döllinger after Vatican I. In December 1907, Tyrrell wrote to a German correspondent: "Is it not time to reconsider the pseudo-council of 1870 and to ask whether the Alt-Katholiks were not, after all, in the right? Ex fructibus eorum etc. ["You will know them by their fruits"; Matthew 7:16] may surely be used as a criterion of Ultramontanism. Individuals, like myself, can afford to stand aloof as Döllinger did. But can multitudes live without sacraments and external communion? And yet now no educated man or woman will be able to remain in communion with Pius X." Tyrrell was also inspired by the posthumous publication of Lord Acton's History of Freedom and Other Essays in 1907.

== History of the modernist controversy ==
Although the so-called "Modernist Crisis" is usually dated between 1893 (the publication date of Pope Leo XIII's encyclical Providentissimus Deus) and 1914 (the death of Pope Pius X), the controversy had, and continues to have, both a pre-history and a post-history.

=== Pre-history: Liberal Catholicism in the 19th century ===
With notable exceptions like Richard Simon or the Bollandists, Catholic studies in the 17th, 18th and 19th centuries had tended to avoid the use of critical methodology because of its rationalist tendencies. Frequent political revolutions, the bitter opposition of "liberalism" to the Church and the expulsion of religious orders from France and Germany had made the church understandably suspicious of the new intellectual currents.

Following the French Revolution and the subsequent coming to power of the Conservative Order, the Magisterium had enacted harsh condemnations against liberalism, rationalism, pantheism, panentheism, deism, indifferentism, socialism, communism and other popular philosophies. Non-Catholic Bible translations and interpretations had been met with similar scorn.

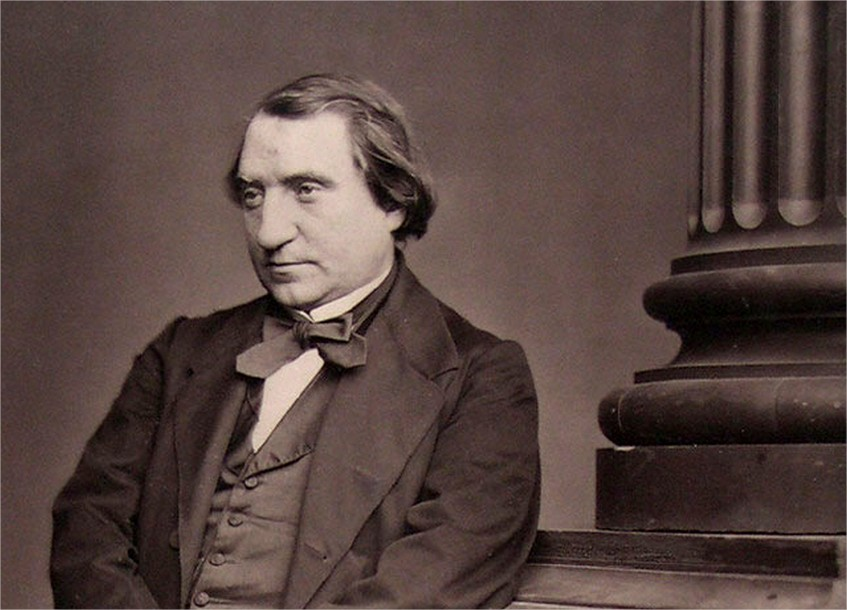
Ernest Renan

In 1863, Ernest Renan published Vie de Jésus (Life of Jesus). Renan had trained for the priesthood before choosing a secular career as a philologist and historian. His book described Jesus as un homme incomparable – a man, no doubt extraordinary, but only a man. The book was very popular, but cost him his chair of Hebrew at the Collège de France. Among Renan's most controversial ideas was that "a miracle does not count as a historical event; people believing in a miracle does." Renan's Jesus is a man of simple piety and almost unimaginable charisma whose main historical significance was his legion of followers.

In the same year, Church historian Ignaz von Döllinger invited about 100 German theologians to meet in Munich (Münchener Gelehrtenversammlung, 1863) to discuss the state of Catholic theology. In his address, "On the Past and Future of Catholic Theology", Döllinger advocated greater academic freedom of theology within the Church, formulating a critique of neo-scholastic theology and championing the historical method in theology. Döllinger's friend Charles de Montalembert gave two powerful speeches at the Catholic Congress in Malines that year too, insisting that the church had to reconcile itself with civil equality and religious freedom.

On 8 December 1864 Pope Pius IX issued the encyclical Quanta cura, decrying what he considered significant errors afflicting the modern age. It condemned certain propositions such as: "the people's will, manifested by what is called public opinion [...] constitutes a supreme law, free from all divine and human control"; on civil law alone depend all rights of parents over their children, and especially that of providing for education; and that religious orders have no legitimate reason for being permitted. Some of these condemnations were aimed at anticlerical governments in various European countries, which were in the process of secularizing education and taking over Catholic schools, as well as suppressing religious orders and confiscating their property. Attached to the encyclical was a Syllabus Errorum, which had been condemned in previous papal documents, requiring recourse to the original statements to be understood. The Syllabus reacted not only to modern atheism, materialism, and agnosticism, but also to Liberal Catholicism and the new critical study of the Bible. It was also a direct reaction to Döllinger's speech in Munich and Montalembert's speeches in Malines. Among the propositions condemned in the Syllabus were:

- "7. The prophecies and miracles set forth and recorded in the Sacred Scriptures are the fiction of poets, and the mysteries of the Christian faith the result of philosophical investigations. In the books of the Old and the New Testament there are contained mythical inventions, and Jesus Christ is Himself a myth."
- "13. The method and principles by which the old scholastic doctors cultivated theology are no longer suitable to the demands of our times and to the progress of the sciences." – Letter to the Archbishop of Munich, Tuas libenter, December 21, 1863.
- "15. Every man is free to embrace and profess the Religion he shall believe true, guided by the light of reason." – Apostolic Letter, Multiplices inter, 10 June 1851. Allocution Maxima quidem, 9 June 1862.

The First Vatican Council was held from December 1869 to October 1870. The council provoked a degree of controversy even before it met. In anticipation that the subject of papal infallibility would be discussed, many bishops, especially in France and Germany, expressed the opinion that the time was "inopportune". Ignaz von Döllinger led a movement in Germany hostile to the definition of infallibility. In Döllinger's view, there was no foundation for this definition in Catholic tradition. After the definition, Döllinger was excommunicated by the Archbishop of Munich Gregor von Scherr in 1871. Montalembert died before the end of the council.

The dogmatic Constitution on the Catholic Faith, Dei Filius, tried to steer a middle way between rationalism and fideism. It presented a concept of revelation which highlighted the aspect of divine instruction by revelation. The dogmatic Constitution Pastor Aeternus addressed the primacy of the pope and rejected the idea that decrees issued by the pope for the guidance of the church are not valid unless confirmed by the secular power. It also declared papal infallibility when speaking ex cathedra on matters of faith and morals. Other matters were deferred when the Italian infantry entered Rome and the council was prorogued. The Council remained formally open until 1960, when it was officially closed by Pope John XXIII, in order to convene the Second Vatican Council.

The First Vatican Council's decisions were so controversial that they even caused a schism of some German, Swiss, Austrian and Dutch liberal Catholics, who broke away from the Vatican and merged with the Jansenists, who had maintained a somewhat precarious hierarchy in the Netherlands, into the Old Catholic Church, which exists to this day.

=== The beginning of the modernist controversy under Leo XIII ===
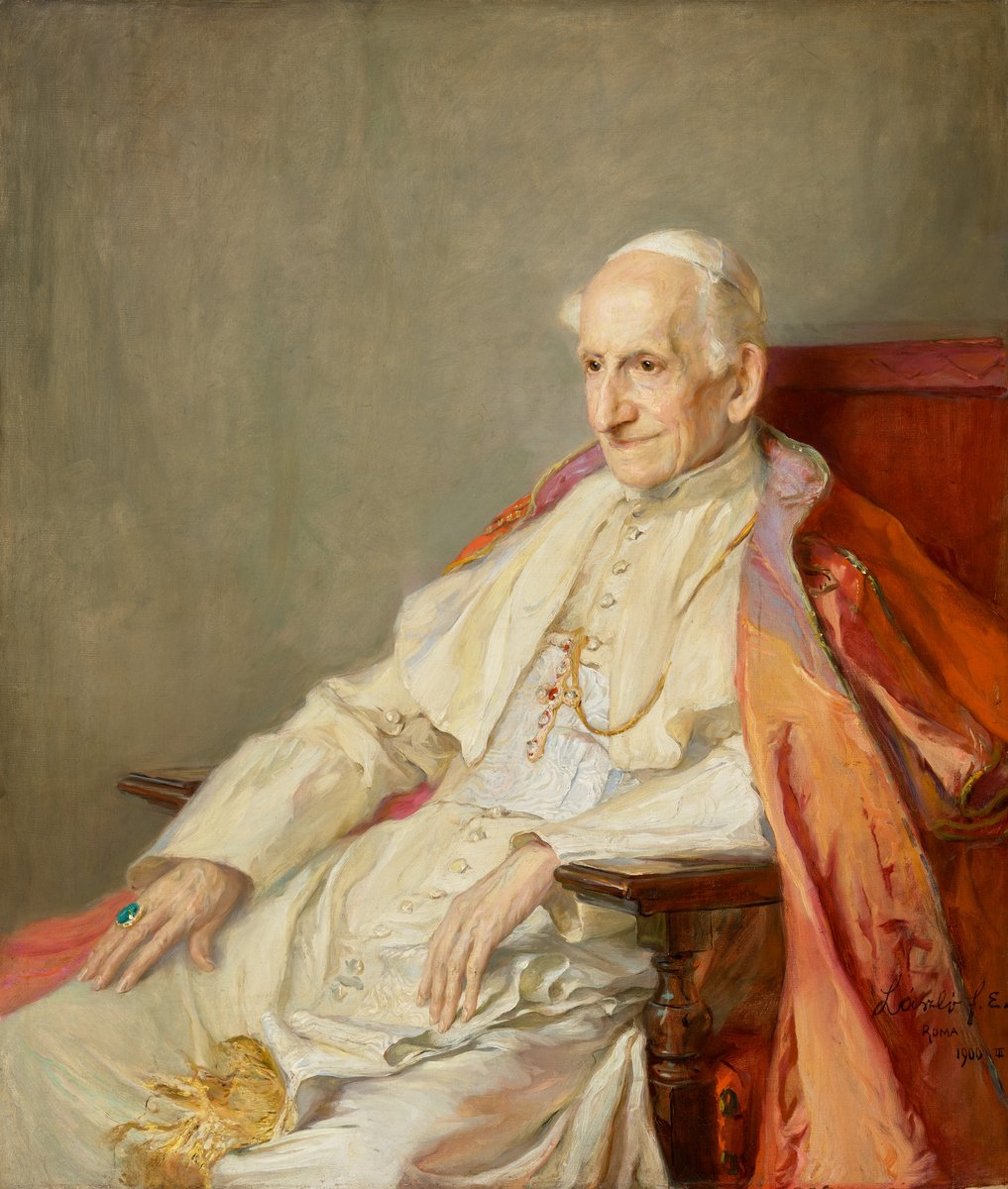
Pope Leo XIII

Pope Leo XIII, Pius IX's successor, wanted to advance what he understood as the true Christian science in every way: he worked for a revival of Thomism as Christian philosophy, he encouraged the study of history and archaeology, and in 1881 he opened up the Vatican Archives for researchers. In 1887 he encouraged the study of the natural sciences, and in 1891 opened a new Vatican Observatory. Leo's response to the rationalist trend to undermine the authority of sacred scripture was for the Church to have its own trained experts. In 1893, with Providentissimus Deus, Pope Leo gave the first formal authorization for the use of critical methods in biblical scholarship. "Hence it is most proper that Professors of Sacred Scripture and theologians should master those tongues in which the sacred Books were originally written, and have a knowledge of natural science." He recommended that the student of scripture be first given a sound grounding in the interpretations of the Fathers such as Tertullian, Cyprian, Hilary, Ambrose, Leo the Great, Gregory the Great, Augustine and Jerome, and understand what they interpreted literally, and what allegorically; and note what they lay down as belonging to faith and what is opinion.

Although Providentissimus Deus tried to encourage Catholic biblical studies, it also created problems. In the encyclical, Leo XIII excluded the possibility of restricting the inspiration and inerrancy of the bible to matters of faith and morals. Thus, he interfered in the lively discussion about biblical inspiration in France, where Maurice d'Hulst, founder of the Institut Catholique de Paris, had opted for a more open solution in his article on La question biblique. Not only exegetes of this école large were now in trouble, but also the prominent French theologian Alfred Loisy who worked for a thoroughly historical understanding of the Bible, in order to open up spaces for theological reform. The Roman Congregation of the Index began to prepare a censuring of Loisy's main works, but until the death of Leo XIII in 1903 no decision was taken, as there was also considerable resistance within the Roman Curia against a premature judgment on matters of biblical interpretation.

On the whole, official Catholic attitudes to the study of Scripture at the turn of the 20th century were of cautious advance, and a growing appreciation of what had promise for the future. In 1902, Pope Leo XIII instituted the Pontifical Biblical Commission, which was to adapt Catholic Biblical studies to modern scholarship and to protect Scripture against attacks.

=== Marie-Joseph Lagrange ===
In 1890 the École Biblique, the first Catholic school specifically dedicated to the critical study of the bible, was established in Jerusalem by Dominican Marie-Joseph Lagrange. In 1892 Pope Leo XIII gave his official approval. While many of Lagrange's contemporaries criticized the new scientific and critical approach to the Bible, he made use of it. Lagrange founded the Revue Biblique, and his first articles drew sharp criticism, but Pope Leo was not inclined to discourage new ideas. As long as Pope Leo lived, Lagrange's work quietly progressed, but after Leo's death, an ultra-conservative reaction set in. The historical-critical method was considered suspect by the Vatican. Père Lagrange, like other scholars involved in the 19th-century renaissance of biblical studies, was suspected of being a modernist. In 1912 Lagrange was given an order for the Revue Biblique to cease publication and to return to France. The École itself was closed for a year, and then Lagrange was sent back to Jerusalem to continue his work.

=== Duchesne and Loisy ===
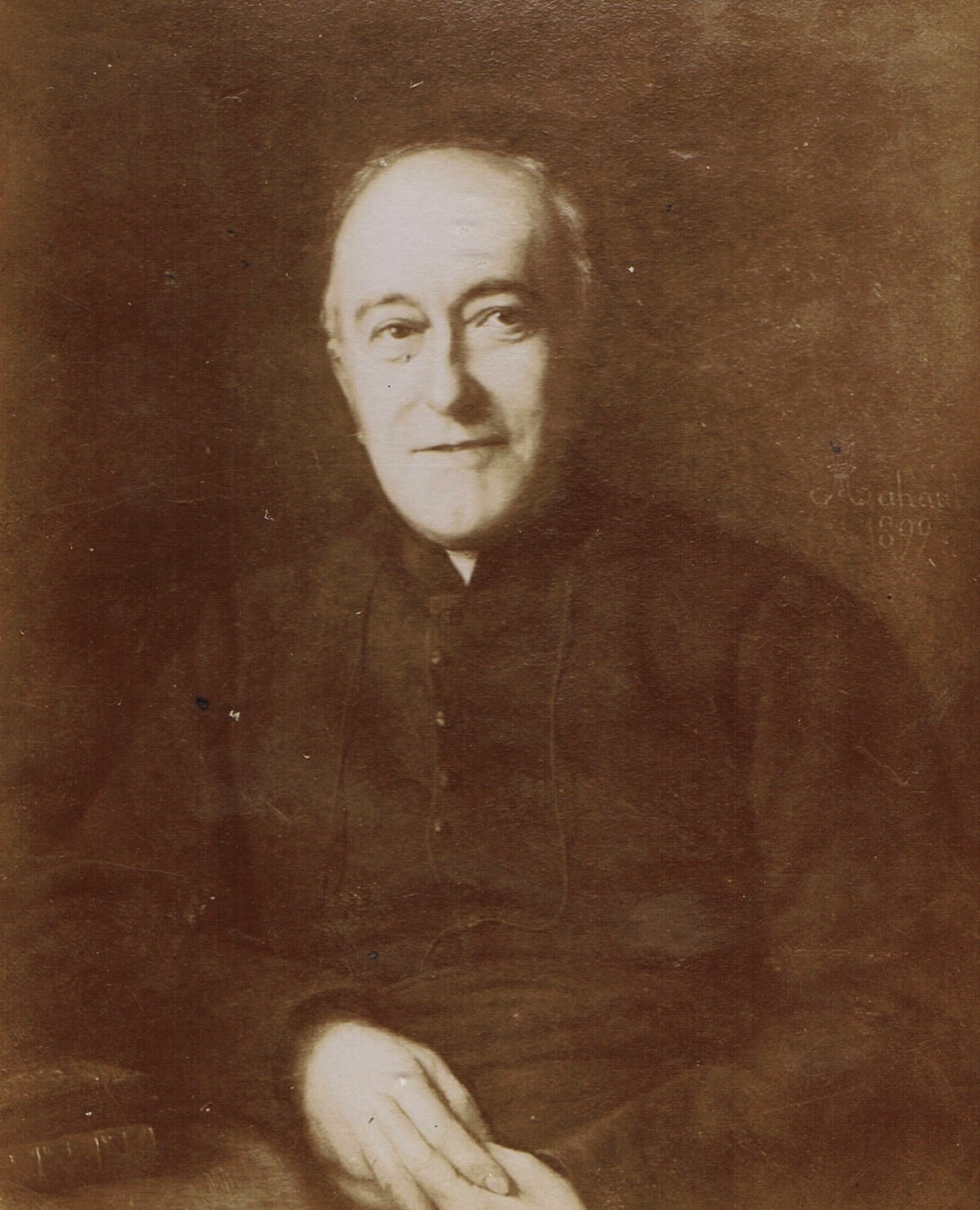
Louis Duchesne, 1899

Louis Duchesne was a French priest, philologist, teacher, and amateur archaeologist. Trained at the École pratique des Hautes Études in Paris, he applied modern methods to church history, drawing together archaeology and topography to supplement literature and setting ecclesiastical events within the contexts of social history. Duchesne held the chair of ecclesiastical history at the Institut Catholique de Paris, and was frequently in contact with like-minded historians among the Bollandists, with their long history of critical editions of hagiographies. Duchesne gained fame as a demythologizing critical historian of the popular, pious lives of saints produced by Second Empire publishers. However, his Histoire ancienne de l'Église, 1906–1911 (translated as Early History of the Christian Church) was considered too modernist by the church at the time, and was placed on the Index of Forbidden Books in 1912.

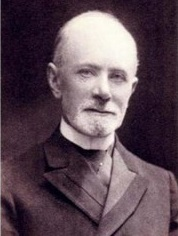
Alfred Loisy

Alfred Loisy was a French Catholic priest, professor and theologian generally credited as the "father of Catholic Modernism". He had studied at the Institut Catholique under Duchesne and attended the course on Hebrew by Ernest Renan at the Collège de France. Harvey Hill says that the development of Loisy's theories have to be seen also in the context of France's Church-State conflict, which contributed to Loisy's crisis of faith in the 1880s. In November 1893, Loisy published the last lecture of his course, in which he summed up his position on biblical criticism in five propositions: the Pentateuch was not the work of Moses, the first five chapters of Genesis were not literal history, the New Testament and the Old Testament did not possess equal historical value, there was a development in scriptural doctrine, and Biblical writings were subject to the same limitations as those by other authors of the ancient world. When his attempts at theological reform had failed, Loisy came to regard the Christian religion more as a system of humanistic ethics than as divine revelation. He was excommunicated in 1908.

=== The climax of the controversy under Pius X ===
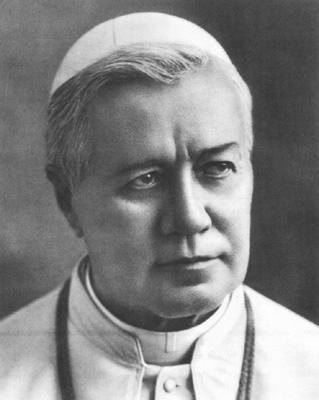
Pope Pius X

Pope Pius X, who succeeded Leo XIII in August 1903, engaged almost immediately in the ongoing controversy. Reacting on pressure from the Parisian Archbishop Cardinal François-Marie-Benjamin Richard, he transferred the censuring of Loisy from the Congregation of the Index to the Supreme Sacred Congregation of the Holy Office. Already in December 1903, Loisy's main exegetical works were censured. At the same time the Holy Office began to prepare a syllabus of errors contained in the works of Loisy. Due to ongoing internal resistance, especially from the Master of the Sacred Palace, the papal theologian Alberto Lepidi OP, this Syllabus was published only in July 1907 as the decree Lamentabili sane exitu, which condemned sixty-five propositions from the field of biblical interpretation and the history of dogma. Lamentabili did not mention the term modernism, and it seems that Pius X and his close collaborators like Cardinal Rafael Merry del Val and Cardinal José de Calasanz Vives y Tutó were not satisfied with the document.

Therefore, in the summer of 1907, another document was prepared in a small circle around the Pope and already in September 1907, Pius X promulgated the encyclical Pascendi dominici gregis, which formulated a synthesis of modernism and popularized the term itself. The encyclical condemned modernism as embracing every heresy. Pascendi described the "modernist" in seven "roles": as purely immanentist philosopher, as believer who relies only on their own religious experience, as theologian who understands dogma symbolically, as historian and biblical scholar who dissolves divine revelation by means of the historical-critical method into purely immanent processes of development, as apologete who justifies the Christian truth only from immanence, and as reformer who wants to change the church in a radical way. Agnosticism, immanentism, evolutionism and reformism are the keywords used by the Pope to describe the philosophical and theological system of modernism. The encyclical describes the modernist as an enemy of scholastic philosophy and theology and resistant to the teachings of the Magisterium; their moral qualities are curiosity, arrogance, ignorance, and falsehood. Modernists deceive the simple believers by not presenting their entire system, but only parts of it. Therefore, the encyclical wants to reveal the secret system of modernism. Pascendi contained also disciplinary measures for the promotion of scholastic philosophy and theology in the seminaries, for the removal of suspect professors and candidates for the priesthood, for a more rigid censuring of publications and for the creation of an antimodernist control group in every diocese. All bishops and superiors of religious orders had to report regularly on the execution of these measures.

Pius frequently condemned the movement, and was deeply concerned that its adherents could go on believing themselves strict Catholics while understanding dogma in a markedly untraditional sense (a consequence of the notion of evolution of dogma). Therefore, in 1910, he introduced an anti-modernist oath to be taken by all Catholic priests.

To ensure enforcement of these decisions, Monsignor Umberto Benigni organized, through his personal contacts with theologians and laymen in various European countries, a secret network of informants who would report to him those thought to be teaching condemned doctrine or engaging in political activities (like Christian Democratic Parties, Christian Unions) which were also deemed to be "modernist" because they were not controlled by the Catholic hierarchy. This group was called the Sodalitium Pianum, i.e. Fellowship of Pius (V), with the code name of La Sapinière. Its frequently overzealous and clandestine methods often hindered rather than helped the Church combat modernism. Benigni also published the journal La Corrispondenza Romana/Correspondance de Rome, which initiated press campaigns against practical and social modernism throughout Europe. Benigni fell out with Cardinal Secretary of State Rafael Merry del Val in 1911. The Sodalitium was eventually dissolved in 1921. Recent research has stressed the antisemitic character of Benigni's antimodernism.

=== In America ===
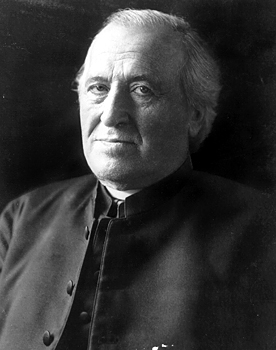
Archbishop John Ireland (1838−1918)

With his slogan "Church and Age unite!", Archbishop John Ireland of Saint Paul, Minnesota, became the hero of reformers in France (Félix Klein), Italy and Germany (Herman Schell) in the 1890s. The modernist controversy in the United States was thus initially dominated by the conflict on "Americanism", which after Pascendi was also presented as a "forerunner" of modernism in Catholic heresiology. "Americanism" was perceived as an influence of classical liberalism in the Catholic Church in the United States, particularly regarding the concept of separation of Church and State. Such tendencies alarmed Pope Leo XIII, who condemned them, at the urging of Archbishop Ireland's old opponent from Minnesota Archbishop John Joseph Frederick Otto Zardetti, in the apostolic letter Testem benevolentiae nostrae (1899). Archbishop Ireland had to be extremely careful to avoid condemnation for his views.

Following the issuing of Pascendi, the antimodernist measures were especially felt in the Archdiocese of New York: The New York Review was a journal produced by Saint Joseph's Seminary. It printed papers by leading Catholic Biblical experts who were part of the newly emerging schools of Biblical criticism, which raised eyebrows in Rome. Around 1908, the Review was discontinued, ostensibly for financial reasons, although there is strong evidence that it was suppressed for modernist tendencies. Despite his support for modernization, Archbishop Ireland actively campaigned against modernism following the Pascendi encyclical: this apparently inconsistent behavior stemmed from Ireland's concept of a "golden mean" between "ultraconservatism", rendering the Church irrelevant, and "ultraliberalism," discarding the Church's message.

=== Post-history in the 20th and 21st centuries ===
After the pontificate of Pius X, there was a gradual abatement of attacks against modernists. The new Pope Benedict XV, who was elected to succeed Pius X in 1914, once again condemned modernism in his encyclical Ad beatissimi Apostolorum, but also urged Catholics to cease condemning fellow believers. Nevertheless, theological antimodernism continued to influence the climate within the Church. The Holy Office, until 1930 under the guidance of Cardinal Rafael Merry del Val, continued to censure modernist theologians and rationalist exegesis was once again condemned by the Pontiff in his encyclical Spiritus Paraclitus.

In the 1930s, Loisy's opera omnia ("all works") were placed on the Index Librorum Prohibitorum. During World War I, French propaganda claimed that the Catholic Church in Germany was infested with modernism. Already in 1913 it had been claimed by the French academic Edmond Vermeil that the Catholic Tübingen School in the mid-19th century, with its interest for the "organic development" of the church in history, was a "forerunner" of "modernism" – a claim which has been debated ever since.

Between World War I and the Second Vatican Council, Réginald Garrigou-Lagrange OP was a "torchbearer of orthodox Thomism" against modernism. Garrigou-Lagrange, who was a professor of philosophy and theology at the Pontifical University of Saint Thomas Aquinas, Angelicum, is commonly held to have influenced the decision in 1942 to place the privately circulated book Une école de théologie: le Saulchoir (Étiolles-sur-Seine 1937) by Marie-Dominique Chenu OP on the Vatican's "Index of Forbidden Books" as the culmination of a polemic within the Dominican Order between the Angelicum supporters of a speculative scholasticism and the French revival Thomists who were more attentive to historical hermeneutics, such as Yves Congar OP

At the beginning of the 1930s, Congar read the Mémoires of Loisy and realised that modernism had addressed problems in theology which were still not resolved by neo-scholastic theology. Chenu and Congar, two protagonists of the Nouvelle théologie, began to prepare a dossier on this topic. In 1946, Congar wrote to Chenu that neo-scholastic theology had already begun to "liquidate" itself on a daily basis and that the Jesuits were among the fiercest "liquidators". Congar's Chrétiens désunis was also suspected of modernism because its methodology derived more from religious experience than from syllogistic analysis.

A first relaxation of the strict anti-modernist measures imposed on biblical scholars by Pius X came in 1943: on that year, Pope Pius XII issued the encyclical Divino afflante Spiritu, regulating the issue of Biblical exegesis. The encyclical inaugurated the modern period of Roman Catholic Biblical studies by encouraging the study of textual criticism (or 'lower criticism'), pertaining to text of the Scriptures themselves and transmission thereof (for example, to determine correct readings) and permitted the use of the historical-critical method (or 'higher criticism') to be informed by theology, Sacred Tradition, and ecclesiastical history on the historical circumstances of the text, hypothesizing about matters such as authorship, dating, and similar concerns. Catholic Biblical scholar Raymond E. Brown SS described the encyclical as a "Magna Carta for biblical progress".

Despite his cautious openings on the issue of biblical criticism, Pius XII was suspicious of the new theological trends, which he feared could cause a modernist revival: in 1950, he published the encyclical Humani generis, in which he condemned "certain new intellectual currents" in the Church, accusing them of relativism and attacking them for reformulating dogmas in a way that was not consistent with Church tradition and for following biblical hermeneutics that deviated from the teachings of Providentissimus Deus, Spiritus Paraclitus and Divino afflante Spiritu. The encyclical specifically accused these new "trends" of having embraced the modernist heresy condemned by Pius X in Pascendi Dominici gregis. The encyclical did not mention any particular theologian but was widely interpreted as a condemnation of the Nouvelle théologie and was followed by an anti-modernist purge in Le Saulchoir and Fourvière.

Following the election of Pope John XXIII and the calling of the Second Vatican Council, anti-modernist polemics declined and many theologians associated with the Nouvelle théologie were gradually rehabilitated and many of them took part in the council with the qualification of peritus. However, Pope Paul VI once again condemned modernism in his encyclical Ecclesiam Suam (1964), calling it "an error which is still making its appearance under various new guises, wholly inconsistent with any genuine religious expression" and described it as "an attempt on the part of secular philosophies and secular trends to vitiate the true teaching and discipline of the Church of Christ". Despite this, the Oath Against Modernism was abolished on 17 July 1967 by the Congregation for the Doctrine of the Faith with the approval of Paul VI.

Following the council, the more conservative supporters of Nouvelle théologie had important careers in the Church: Jean Daniélou SJ, Yves Congar OP and Henri de Lubac SJ were made cardinals by Pope John Paul II, while Joseph Ratzinger was elected as Pope Benedict XVI in 2005. Hans Urs von Balthasar died two days before being created cardinal. The same honours were not granted to the more liberal members, who were gradually marginalised due to their extreme views: Hans Küng was stripped from his theological license by the Congregation for the Doctrine of the Faith in 1979 for questioning papal infallibility, while Edward Schillebeeckx OP was repeatedly investigated, but never condemned by the Congregation and even by Pope Paul VI himself (encyclical Mysterium fidei) due to his heterodox views about Christology and the eucharist.

References to modernism continue to be frequent among conservative and traditionalist Catholics.

== Notable persons involved in the Modernist controversy ==
- John Ireland (1838–1918), Archbishop of Saint Paul. Considered one of the leaders of Americanism, he later turned against modernism.
- Franz Xaver Kraus (1840–1901), church historian, "Liberal Catholic"
- Louis Duchesne (1843–1922), priest and philologist; one of his books was placed on the Index Librorum Prohibitorum
- Herman Schell (1850–1906), German theologian
- Alfred Loisy (1857–1940), priest and theologian, excommunicated for his views in 1908 and his opera omnia were placed on the Index. Later became an agnostic and a secular scholar at the Collège de France.
- Joseph Turmel (1859–1943), priest and church historian, excommunicated in 1930 and his opera omnia placed on the Index in 1931.
- George Tyrrell (1861–1909), expelled from the Society of Jesus in 1906 for his views and excommunicated in 1908
- Maude Petre (1863–1942), English nun, close friend of Tyrrell, and a participant in the modernist movement as well as one of its first historians and critics; some of her works were placed on the Index Librorum Prohibitorum
- Salvatore Minocchi (1869–1943), priest and biblical scholar, suspended a divinis in 1908, later left the priesthood and became an agnostic.
- Pierre Batiffol (1861–1929), historian of dogma
- Friedrich von Hügel (1852–1925), philosopher of religion
- Wilfrid Ward (1856–1916), English essayist and biographer
- Henri Bremond (1865–1933), French literary scholar, sometime Jesuit, and Catholic philosopher
- Joseph Schnitzer (1859–1939), historian of dogma in Munich
- Giovanni Semeria (1867–1931), Barnabite priest, preacher
- Carl Muth (1867–1944), editor of the cultural and religious journal Hochland
- Ernesto Buonaiuti (1881–1946), who as a scholar of the history of Christianity and of religious philosophy, was a leader in the Italian modernist movement and was excommunicated in 1925

== In popular culture ==
- Irish comedian Dermot Morgan parodied the Modernist trend of the Post-Vatican II Catholic Church in Ireland while appearing on the RTÉ television show The Live Mike between 1979 and 1982. On the show, Morgan played a range of comic characters, including Father Trendy, a trying-to-be-cool hippie-priest, who wore an Elvis haircut, a leather jacket and who was given to drawing ludicrous parallels between religious and non-religious life in two-minute 'sermons' to the camera. Morgan created the character as a satire of Father Brian D'Arcy, a left-wing Passionist priest who was trying to be the chaplain to the show business community in Dublin.
- In the episode "The Bishop's Gambit" of the British TV series Yes Minister (season 1, episode 7), Prime Minister Jim Hacker discusses candidates for an Anglican bishopric with Cabinet Secretary Sir Humphrey Appleby. The Church Commissioners have suggested a candidate who is a "modernist". Sir Humphrey later explains to the PM that "modernist" is ecclesiastical code for an atheist and Marxist Anglican clergyman.

== See also ==
- Americanism (heresy)
- Biblical criticism
- Désiré-Joseph Mercier
- History of Catholic theology
- Integrism
- Joseph Malègue
- Liberal Catholicism
- Nouvelle Théologie
- Spirit of Vatican II
