= Sacrorum =

Sacrorum, a Latin word meaning a sacred oath or rite, may refer to:

- Rex Sacrorum, the office of the highest-ranking priest under the Roman Kingdom
- Sacrorum Antistitum, an oath against modernism issued by Pope Pius X in 1910
