= Lamentabili sane exitu =

1907 Roman Catholic syllabus

Lamentabili sane exitu ("with truly lamentable results") is a 1907 syllabus, prepared by the Roman Inquisition and confirmed by Pope Pius X, which condemns what it deems to be errors in the exegesis of Holy Scripture and in the history and interpretation of dogma.

The syllabus itself does not use the term 'modernist', but was regarded as part of the Pope's campaign against modernism within the Church. Most of the condemned statements in Lamentabili were taken from the writings of Alfred Loisy and his school. Other Modernists like George Tyrrell were targeted only indirectly.

== Aftermath ==
Published in July 1907, Lamentabili was soon to be complemented by the more comprehensive encyclical Pascendi Dominici gregis, which came out in September 1907 and had been prepared in a small circle around the Pope, and the 1910 antimodernist oath Sacrorum Antistitum was compiled by the Holy Office.

== See also ==
- Fundamentalist–Modernist controversy
- Syllabus of Errors
