= Georges Blondel =

French historian (1856–1948)

- Born: March 8, 1856; Dijon, France
- Died: July 31, 1948 (aged 92); Paris, France
- Education: Doctorate in history, 1881
- Alma mater: Lille University, École des Hautes Études Commerciales, Collège de France
- Occupation: Historian
- Known for: Specialisation in the history of Germany and Austria before 1914

Georges Blondel (8 March 1856 – 31 July 1948) was a French historian, specialising in the history of Germany and Austria before 1914. Born in 1856 in Dijon, France, Blondel received his doctorate in 1881 and in 1894 was named professor of letters at Lille University. He died in 1948 in Paris. After receiving his doctorate in 1881 and the rank of agrégé (highest teaching degree) in 1883, he was appointed to a chair of law at Lyon in 1884 and 10 years later was named professor of letters at Lille. He later taught at the École des Hautes Études Commerciales and the Collège de France in Paris.

== Biography ==
Hippolyte Marie Georges Blondel was born on March 8, 1856, in Dijon. He was the brother of the philosopher Maurice Blondel. A classmate of Hubert Lyautey at the high school in Dijon, he went on to study law and was awarded a doctorate in law from the University of Dijon in 1881. He then passed the Agrégation d'histoire.

== Published works ==
- L'Ouvrier allemand (1899; The German Worker)
- L'Essor industriel et commercial du peuple allemand (1898; The Industrial and Commercial Ascent of the German People)
- L'Éducation économique du peuple allemand (1908; The Economic Education of the German People)
- Le Triomphe du germanisme (1934; The Triumph of Pan-Germanism)
