= Franz Xaver Kraus =

German Catholic priest and art historian (1840-1901)

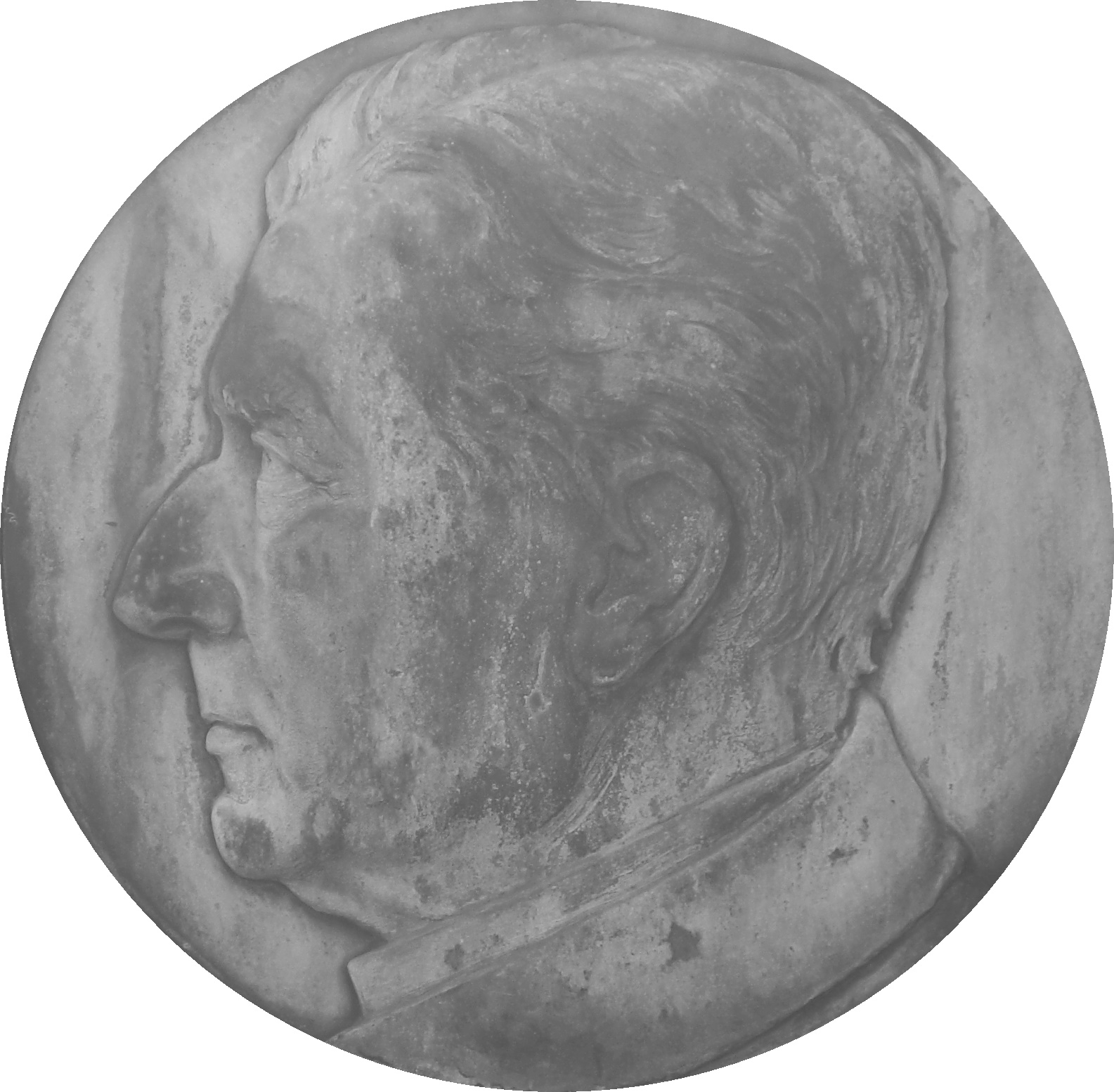
Franz Xaver Kraus. Relief portrait by Joseph von Kopf (1827-1903)

Franz Xaver Kraus (18 September 1840 – 28 December 1901) was a German Catholic priest, and ecclesiastical and art historian.

== Early life ==
Franz Xaver Kraus was born in Trier in 1840. He completed his studies in the Trier gymnasium, began his theology in 1858-60 in the seminary there, and finished it in 1862-64, having passed in France the time from the autumn of 1860 to the spring of 1862 as tutor in distinguished French families. He was ordained a priest by auxiliary bishop Matthias Eberhard of Trier, 23 March 1864. Even after he became a priest, he continued his studies in theology and philology at the universities of Tübingen, Freiburg — where he had received the degree of Doctor of Philosophy in 1862, and received that of Doctor of Divinity in 1865 — and Bonn.

In the autumn of 1865 he became beneficiary of Pfalzel near Trier, where he developed a zealous literary activity, interrupted by several journeys of the purpose of study to Paris, Belgium, and to Rome in January 1870. In the spring of 1872 he was attached to the faculty of philosophy at the university of Strasburg as professor extraordinary of the history of Christian art, and in the autumn of 1878 he succeeded Johann Alzog as Professor ordinary of Church history at Freiburg. In 1890 he was made grand-ducal privy councillor, and held the office of pro-rector of the university for the period 1890-1. He was also curator of religious antiquities in the Grand Duchy of Baden, and from 1883 a member of the Baden Historical Commission.

Kraus died at San Remo in 1901.

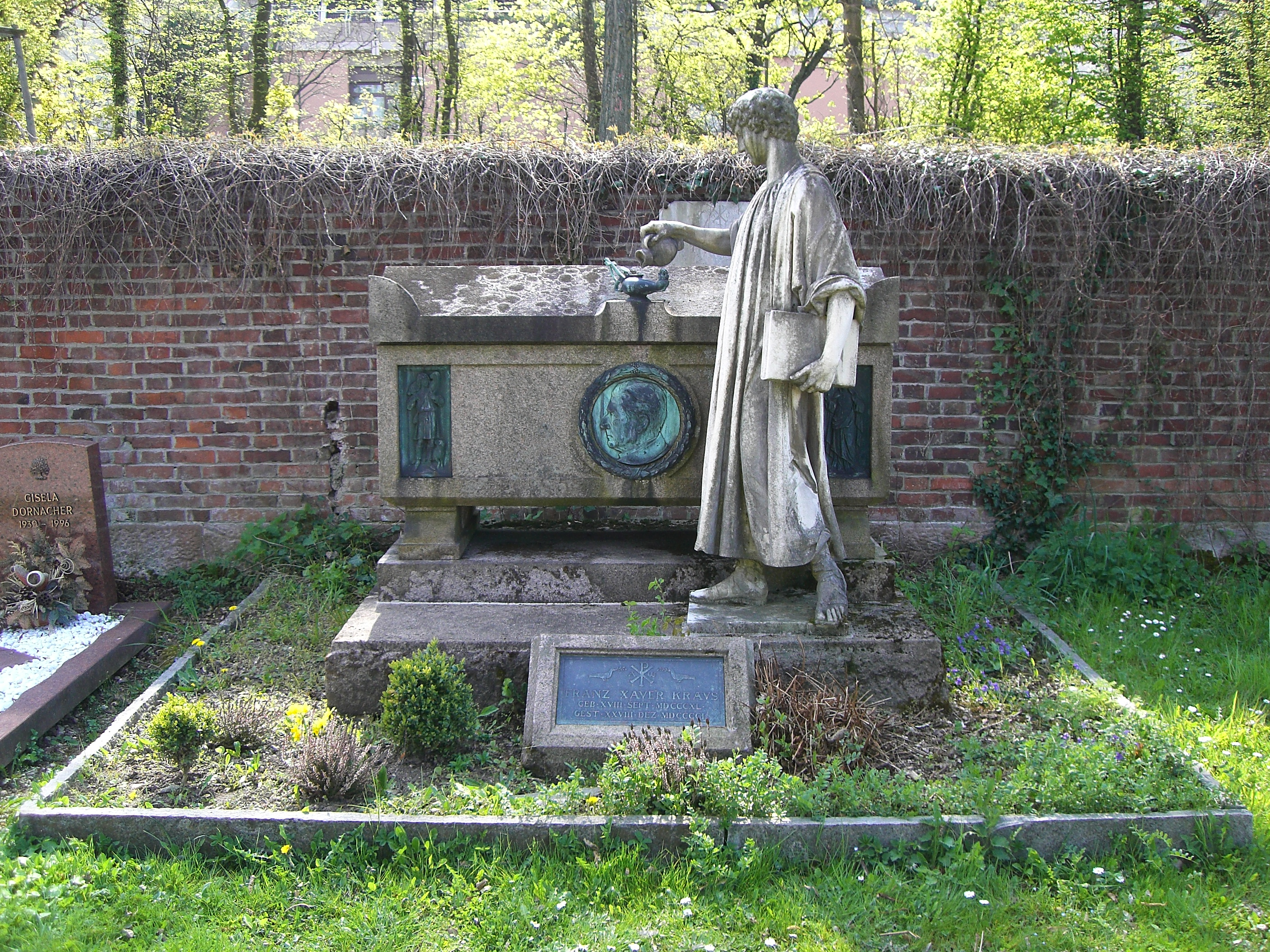
Gravesite of Kraus at the Hauptfriedhof Freiburg

== Views ==
Kraus was a devout Catholic, and an admirer of the Cardinal John Henry Newman, whom he visited at Birmingham. The Catholic Encyclopedia characterizes him as inclined towards Liberal Catholicism, especially regarding ecclesiastical polity, and involved with Americanism and Modernism. Other authors stress the social conservatism of Kraus, who was highly critical of modern mass mobilization by democratic parties, especially by the Catholic Centre Party in Baden.

At the time of the First Council of the Vatican, Kraus entered into close connections with the opposition party, and kept up these relations for some time. In many anonymous or pseudonymous articles written for the Liberal press, he gave vent to his dissatisfaction with certain ecclesiastical conditions. The "Kirchenpolitische Briefe" in the "Beilage zur Allgemeinen Zeitung" (1895-9), written under the pseudonym of "Spectator", created a great sensation.

Kraus formalized a distinction between "religious and political Catholicism".

== Works ==
The Catholic Encyclopedia describes Kraus as "a man of brilliant and versatile talents, a scholar of great learning, a clever and elegant writer, and, in spite of ill-health and the acute bodily sufferings of his closing years, an author of wonderful productivity, who delighted in his work."

After a few translations from the French (van Hemen, de Ravignan, and Lacordaire), Kraus began his independent literary career with small works on the history of early Christian literature in the first centuries and the Middle Ages, among them:

- "Ægidius von Rom" (in "Oesterreichische Vierteljahreschrift für kath. Theologie", I, 1862)
- "Observationes criticae in Synesii Cyrenaei epistulas" (Sulzbach, 1863)
- "Studien uber Synesios von Kyrene" (in "Theologische Quartalschrift, XLVII, 1865
- "Der Briefwechsel Pauli mit Seneca" ("Theologische Quartalschrift", XLIX, 1867)
- "Ueber das Martyrium des h. Ignatius von Antiochien" ("Theol. Quartalschrift", LV, 1873).

Of the edition of the "Opera omnia" of Thomas à Kempis, undertaken by Kraus, only the first volume appeared ("Opuscula", Trier, 1868). Another series of writings, published in the "Bonner Jahrbücher des Vereins von Alterthumsfreunden" and in the "Serapeum", deals with particular features of the history and archeology of Trier.

In this manner Kraus was led on to the study of Christian archaeology in general, and then to Christian art in all its aspects, which became a central interest of his. His publications in this area include:

- "Beiträge zur Trierischen Archaeologie und Geschichte. I, Der heilige Nagel in der Domkirche zu Trier" (Trier, 1868)
- "Die Kunst bei den alten Christen" (Frankfort-on-the-Main, 1868)
- "Die christliche Kunst in ihren frühesten Anfangen. Mit besonderer Berücksichtigung der neuesten Resultate der Katakomben-Forsehung populär dargestellt" (Leipzig, 1872)
- "Ueber den gegenwärtigen Stand der Frage nach dem Inhalte und der Bedeutung der römischen Blutampullen "(Freiburg, 1872)
- "Das Spottcrucifix vom Palatin" (Freiburg, 1872)
- "Roma sotterranea: Die römischen Katakomben. Eine Darstellung der neuesten Forschungen, mit Zugrundelegung des Werkes von J. Spencer Northcote und W. R. Brownlow" (Freiburg, 1873; 2nd ed., 1879)
- "Ueber das Studium der Kunstwissenschaft an den deutschen Hochschulen" (Strasburg, 1874)
- "Ueber Begriff, Umfang, Geschichte der christlichen Archaeologie und die Bedeutung der monumentalen Studien fuer die historische Theologie. Akademische Antrittsrede" (Freiburg, 1879)
- "Synchronistische Tabellen zur christlichen Kunstgeschichte" (Freiburg, 1880)
- "Kunst und Alterthum in Elsass-Lothringen. Beschreibende Statistik im Auftrage des kalserlichen Oberpräsidiums von Elsass-Lothringen herausgegeben" (4 vols, Strasburg, 1876–92)
- "Real-Encyklopaedie der christlichen Alterthümer" (2 vols., Freiburg, 1882-6)
- "Die Kunstdenkmäler des Grossherzogthums Baden" (vols. I — VI, 1, Freiburg, 1887-1904 — continued by other authors)
- "Die christlichen Inschriften der Rheinlande" (2 vols, Freiburg, 1890-4)
- "Geschichte der christlichen Kunst" (vol. I and the first half of volume II (Freiburg, 1896–1900)
- "Die Wandgemälde der St. Georgskirche zu Oberzell auf der Reichenau" (Freiburg, 1884)
- "Die Miniaturen des Codex Egberti in der Stadtbibliothek zu Trier" (Freiburg, 1884)
- "Die Miniaturen der Manesseschen Liederhandschrift" (Strasburg, 1887)
- "Die mittelalterlichen Wandgemälde im Grossherzogthum Baden" (with H. von Oechelhäuser, vol. I, Darmstadt, 1893)
- "Die Wandgemälde der Sylvesterkapelle zu Goldbach am Bodense" (Munich, 1902).

Kraus's literary leanings were directed especially towards Italy. After a close study of Dante, covering years of labour, he published "Dante. Sein Leben und sein Werk. Sein Verhältniss zur Kunst und Politik" (Berlin, 1897). Somewhat earlier he had published "Luca Signorelli's Ilustrationen zu Dante's Divina Commedia" (Freiburg, 1892).

His collected "Essays" belong to Kraus's most brilliant literary efforts (vols. I and II, Berlin, 1896 and 1901); they are of a literary, historical, and political character, and the majority appeared originally in the Deutsche Rundschau; particularly noteworthy are the essays "Antonio Rosmini" — for whom Kraus had a particular veneration — and "Francesco Petrarca in seinem Briefwechsel".

Kraus also published a number of works on church history. Notable among these is his "Lehrbuch der Kirchengeschichte fur Studierende" (lst ed. in 3 parts, Trier, 1872-5; 4th ed., 1896, French translation: "Histoire de l'Eglise par F. X. Kraus traduite par P. Godet et C. Verschaffel" (4 vols. Paris, 1891-2). The Catholic Encyclopedia praises this work for its organization and narrative, but criticizes its author's liberal views. At the second edition of 1882, Kraus was compelled by the pope to withdraw and revise it. The revised edition appeared in 1887 with the ecclesiastical imprimatur.

The first edition of this church history was followed by the "Synchronistische Tabellen zur Kirchengeschichte" (Trier, 1876) and "Charakterbilder aus der christlichen Kirchengeschichte" (5 parts, Trier, 1877), which were designated the fourth and fifth divisions of the ecclesiastical history, but had really the character of separate works. Other works of church history by Kraus include:

- "Briefe Benedicts XIV. an den Canonicus Francesco Peggi in Bologna 1727-1758" (Freiburg and Tübingen, 1884; 2nd ed., 1888)
- "Medicean Rome" in Cambridge Modern History, II (Cambridge, 1903), 1-35
- (as editor) the tenth edition of Alzog's "Handbuch der allgemeinen Kirchengeschichte" (2 vols., Mainz, 1882)
- "Gedächtnissrede auf Johannes Alzog, Professor der Theologie an der Universitat Freiburg" (Freiburg, 1879)

Kraus also wrote some secular history, such as "Die Erhebung Italiens im 19. Jahrhundert: Cavour" (Mainz, 1902 — "Weltgeschichte in Karakterbildern", vol. V).

== Bibliography ==
- Ayers, Robert Curtis (2004). Baroness of the Ripetta: Letters of Augusta Von Eichthal to Franz Xaver Kraus. Cloudbank Creations Inc. ISBN 9780965183574.
- Arnold, Claus (1999). Katholizismus als Kulturmacht. Der Freiburger Theologe Joseph Sauer (1872-1949) und das Erbe des Franz Xaver Kraus. Paderborn: Schöningh. ISBN 9783506799913.
- Arnold, Claus (2018). "Im Zentrum des reformkatholischen Netzwerks. Ein unerledigter Brief Friedrich von Hügels an Franz Xaver Kraus (1901)". In Gottsmann, Andreas (ed.). Incorrupta monumenta ecclesiam defendunt. Studi offerti a mons. Sergio Pagano, prefetto dell'Archivio Segreto Vaticano. Vol. I, 1. Vatican City: Archivio Segreto Vaticano. pp. 33–41. ISBN 9788898638086.
- Arnold, Claus (2009). ""Religiös" versus "politisch" - Der "liberale Katholik" Franz Xaver Kraus über die Kardinäle John Henry Newman und Edward Manning". John Henry Newman. Kirchenlehrer der Moderne. Freiburg: Herder. pp. 54–72. ISBN 9783451303012.
- Braig, Carl. Zur Erinnerung an Franz Xaver Kraus (Freiburg, 1902)
- Deutsche Rundschau, CX (1902), 432-59
- Graf, Michael (2003). Liberaler Katholik – Reformkatholik – Modernist? Franz Xaver Kraus (1840–1901) zwischen Kulturkampf und Modernismuskrise. Münster: LIT. ISBN 3825864812.
- Grauert, Hermann. "Franz Xaver Kraus." In Historisches Jahrbuch (1902), 238-44
- Hauviller, Ernst. F. X. Kraus, ein Lebensbild aus der Zeit des Reformkatholizismus (Colmar, 1904; 2nd ed., Munich, 1905)
- Hürbin, Josef. "F. X. Kraus und die Schweiz." In Hochland, I,2 (1904), 650-67
- Kölnische Volkszeitung (1902, nos. 21, 22, 24)
- Künstle, Karl. "Notice biographique et bibliographique sur F. X. Kraus." In Revue d'histoire ecclésiastique, III (1902), 431-41
- Sauer, Joseph. "Franz Xaver Kraus." In Kunstchronik, New Series, XIII (1901-2), cols. 225-33
- Schrörs, Heinrich. "Franz Xaver Kraus." In Badische Biographien, V (Heidelberg, 1906), 424-42
- Weber, Christoph, ed. (1983). Liberaler Katholizismus. Biographische und kirchenhistorische Essays von Franz Xaver Kraus. Tübingen: Max Niemeyer Verlag. ISBN 3484820578.
