= Modernism (disambiguation) =

Modernism is a movement in the arts in the late 19th and early 20th centuries, or more generally to modern thought, character, practice and/or the philosophy/ideology behind these.

Modernism or modernist may also refer to:

== Theology and philosophy ==
- Modernism in the Catholic Church, theological opinions expressed during the late 19th and early 20th centuries characterized by a break with the past
- Liberal Christianity, used in connection with the Fundamentalist–Modernist controversy
- Modernism (Islam in Indonesia), a religious movement which puts emphasis on teachings purely derived from the Islamic religious scriptures

== Music ==
- Modernism (music), change and development in musical language that occurred at or around the turn of the 20th century
- Modernism: A New Decade, a 1998 album by The Style Council
- "moDernisT", a 2015 remake of the song Tom's Diner

== Art and architecture ==
- Modern architecture, an architectural movement or style based upon new technologies of construction
- Modern art, artistic works produced roughly from the 1860s to the 1970s, and the style and philosophy of the art produced during that era

== Literature ==
- Modernist literature, a self-conscious break with traditional styles of poetry and verse in the late 19th and early 20th centuries
- Modernist poetry, written, mainly in Europe and North America, between 1890 and 1950 in the tradition of modernist literature

== Science ==
- Moderne Algebra (1930), first textbook to axiomatically develop groups, rings, and fields
- Modernism/modernity, a peer-reviewed academic journal founded in 1994

== See also ==
- Modernisme, a cultural movement associated with the search for Catalan national identity
- Modernismo, a Spanish-American literary movement
- Modernity
- Postmodernism
