= Maude Petre =

British nun and writer (1863–1942)

Maude Dominica Mary Petre FCM (4 August 1863 – 16 December 1942) was an English Roman Catholic nun, writer and critic involved in the Modernist controversy.

== Life ==
Petre (pronounced Peter) was born at the family estate of Coptfold Hall, near the village of Margaretting, Essex, to an old recusant family on her father's side; her mother was a convert. Her grandfathers were the 11th Baron Petre and the 4th Earl of Wicklow. Petre was educated privately. In her early twenties she experienced some religious doubts and as a remedy she was advised by her Jesuit confessor Fr. Peter Gallwey to go to Rome and study St Thomas Aquinas. Reflecting many years later on her decision to follow this advice, Petre concluded that "it was a fairly crazy idea". Nevertheless, in 1885, at the age of 22, she left for Rome where for a year, under the direction of accredited professors, she immersed herself in the thought of Aquinas and in the neo-scholastic manuals then in use. Her aunt Lady Lindsay informed friends that "Maude has gone to Rome to study for the priesthood".

In 1890, Petre joined the Daughters of the Heart of Mary, a community founded in France during the French Revolution and following patterns of life innovative with respect to the more traditional female religious institutes. In particular, it allowed members to live in their own homes and wear street clothing instead of habits. She was named local superior in 1896 and provincial in 1900.

In 1900, she began a friendship with the Jesuit priest George Tyrrell and they soon became part of a circle of questioning Catholic intellectuals. Petre already knew Friedrich von Hügel from her childhood, when he was one of her mother's most favoured visitors. He introduced both her and Tyrrell to the work of Alfred Loisy. She had got to know Henri Bremond while visiting the headquarters of her religious community in Paris. Through her, Bremond and Tyrrell became acquainted. When Tyrrell was expelled from the Jesuits in 1906, Petre, who had bought Mulberry House in Storrington, Sussex, had a cottage built for him in the garden and settled an annuity on him.

In 1907, when Petre's book Catholicism and Independence: Being Studies in Spiritual Liberty was published, she was refused permission to renew her vows in the Daughters of the Heart of Mary. Peter Amigo, the then-Bishop of Southwark, refused Petre the sacraments in his diocese shortly thereafter. She dealt with this by worshipping regularly elsewhere.

After the death of George Tyrrell in 1909, Maude Petre was concerned to compile his biography. In 1912 she published this in two volumes, although the first was in fact Tyrrell's own autobiography of his earlier years. The evident sympathy that she showed for Tyrrell in his quarrel with the authorities of the Roman Catholic Church led to her work being placed on the Index of Forbidden Books by the Holy See in 1913. This increased her own difficulties with the Catholic hierarchy, but her loyalty to Tyrrell's memory continued with her publication of his Essays on Faith and Immortality in 1914 and a collection of his letters in 1920.

Her book on the Modernist movement, Modernism: Its Failure and Its Fruits (published 1918 but completed in 1914), was one of the earliest analyses of the Modernist movement. It is not an objective study, but shows considerable sympathy for the Catholic Modernists, many of whom she knew personally, and is highly critical of the anti-Modernist movement then dominant in the Catholic Church.

During World War I, she was involved in nursing work in France and her writings show a growing interest in social and political themes. In her 1915 book, Reflections of a Non-Combatant, she was critical of the unthinking patriotic euphoria of the early stages of the war and showed some sympathy for the ideals of pacifism. She wrote various articles during the war on similar themes. In 1918 she published Democracy at the Cross-Roads, in which she pointed to the limitations of democracy in a period when the suffrage was being considerably extended. In 1919 she published, with James Walker, State Morality and a League of Nations, a work on the then nascent League of Nations in which she analysed the practical difficulties behind the ideals of the League. But her 1925 book The Two Cities, or Statecraft and Idealism showed her commitment to internationalism and the need for a genuine reconciliation of peoples beyond mere political agendas in the post-war period. She is important as the only English Modernist to write on social and political matters.

In the post-war period, she revived her interest in theological and religious issues, continuing her commitment to the ideals of Catholic Modernism. This meant she was an isolated figure in the Catholic Church in this period, when Modernism was very much out of favour. Despite this, she never left the Church and indeed in her memoir My Way of Faith (1937) she spoke of her personal loyalty to the Church and her need of its spiritual guidance in her life.

In 1928, she published The Ninth Lord Petre, a study of her ancestor Robert Petre, 9th Baron Petre (1742-1801), which showed him as being as critical of the Catholic Church in his generation as she was in her own. Later she published major studies of Modernist figures, especially von Hügel and Tyrrell in Von Hügel and Tyrrell: The Story of a Friendship (1937) and the French Modernist, Alfred Loisy, of whom she was a personal friend, in Alfred Loisy: His Religious Significance (published posthumously in 1944).

She also published numerous articles on Modernism and related topics. Indeed, she continued to write almost up to her sudden death in London in December 1942 at the age of 79.

She was accorded a Requiem Mass at the Assumption Convent, Kensington Square, and was buried at Storrington near to George Tyrrell. Owing to her unrepentant Modernist views, the bishop of her diocese, Amigo, would not allow a Catholic priest to officiate at her burial.

== Books ==
- 1896: Aethiopum Servus: A Study in Christian Altruism
- 1903: Where Saints Have Trod: Some Studies in Asceticism
- 1907: Catholicism and Independence: Being Studies in Spiritual Liberty
- 1910: Translation with Paul V. Cohn of "Songs of Prince Free-as-a-Bird" by Friedrich Nietzsche, included as an appendix to vol. 10 The Joyous Wisdom ("La gaya scienza") of The Complete Works of Friedrich Nietzsche edited by Oscar Levy. Edinburgh: T. N. Foulis
- 1912: Autobiography and Life of George Tyrrell (in 2 volumes)
- 1915: Reflections of a Non-Combatant
- 1918: Modernism: Its Failure and Its Fruits
- 1918: Democracy at the Cross-Roads
- 1919: State Morality and a League of Nations (with James Walker)
- 1925: The Two Cities, or Statecraft and Idealism
- 1928: The Ninth Lord Petre, or Pioneers of Roman Catholic Emancipation
- 1937: My Way of Faith
- 1937: Von Hügel and Tyrrell: The Story of a Friendship
- 1944: Alfred Loisy: His Religious Significance
- 1998 A Week End Book of Thought and Prayer (edited by Peter C. Erb)
