= Henri Brémond =

French literary scholar, philosopher and priest

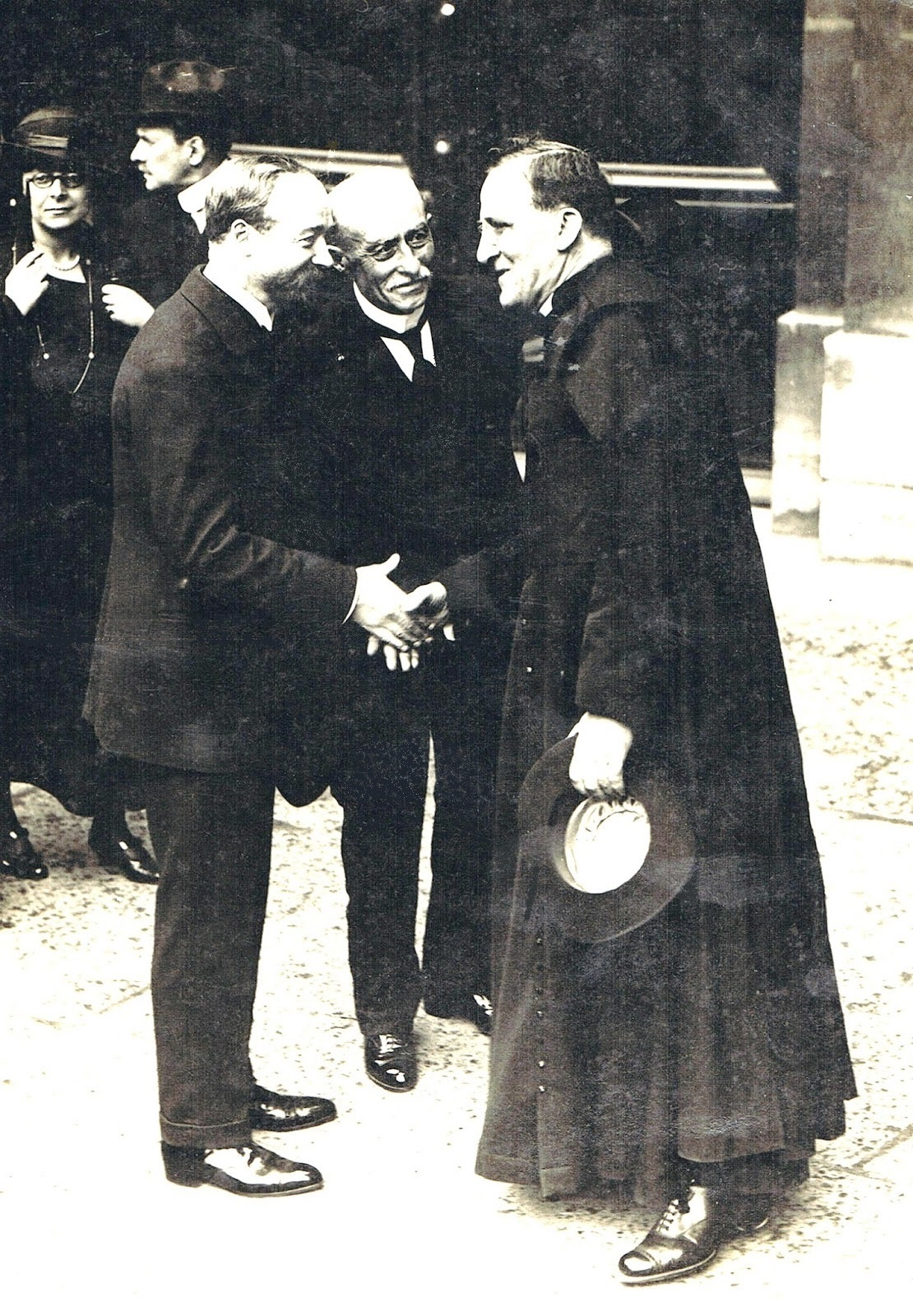
- Henri Brémond (right) shakes hand with Alexandre Miniac (left) at the Académie Française, c. 1923.
- Born: 31 July 1865; Aix-en-Provence, France
- Died: August 17, 1933 (aged 68); Arthez-d'Asson, France
- Burial place: Saint-Pierre Cemetery, France

Henri Brémond (31 July 1865 – 17 August 1933) was a French literary scholar and philosopher, Catholic priest, and sometime Jesuit. He was one of the theological modernists.

== Biography ==
Henri Marie Brémond was born in Aix-en-Provence, the son of Pierre and Thomasine Pons Brémond. His father was a notary; his mother died when he was fourteen. Three of his brothers became priests, two of them Jesuits. A sister became a nun. He attended the College du Sacré-Coeur in Aix.

At the age of seventeen, he joined the Society of Jesus. He served his novitiate in Sidmouth, Devon, and received orders in 1892. He then taught for two years. In 1899, he became the editor of the French Jesuit review Études.

Brémond's early works, such as L'Inquiétude religieuse (1901) dealt with religion and spirituality. He left the Society of Jesus in 1904, but remained a priest. In the summer of 1909 he was suspended for an address he gave at the funeral of his friend, the modernist George Tyrrell. Brémond made a sign of the cross over Tyrrell's grave, for which he was temporarily suspended a divinis by Bishop Amigo, but his faculties to celebrate Mass were restored later that year.

Brémond's attention then turned to the subject of religious sentiment. The same month that he made his submission to the bishop, Brémond began a series of articles in the Annales de philosophie chrétienne, which were then published as Apologie pour Fénelon (1910). French historian of spirituality Émile Goichot sees an explicit "...parallel between Brémond's refusal to disown Tyrrell at his death and Fénelon's conduct in relation to [Madame] Guyon".

Brémond became a prolific author of books on literary topics and Catholicism. Brémond's magnum opus was his Histoire littéraire du sentiment religieux en France (1916–1933). He wrote for Le Correspondant, Revue des deux mondes and the Revue de Paris. He had a permanent interest in English topics, including public schools (Thring of Uppingham), the evolution of Anglican clergy (Walter Lake, J. R. Green), and he wrote a study of the psychology of John Henry Newman (1906, well before Geoffrey Faber's attempt).

Sainte Chantal, published in 1912, was placed on the Index Librorum Prohibitorum in 1913. André Blanchet argues that the book's condemnation was not only due to Brémond's unconventional treatment of the relationship between Jane Frances de Chantal and Francis de Sales, but also because of his friendship with Tyrrell, and his portrayal of Fenelon's arch-critic Bishop Jacques-Bénigne Bossuet in Apologie pour Fénelon, an opinion in which Alastair Guinan concurs.

Brémond became a member of the Académie française succeeding Louis Duchesne, being elected in 1923 to the seat number 36. He was also awarded the Légion d'honneur.

Henri Brémond died in Arthez-d'Asson, in the Pyrénées-Atlantiques department of France, and was buried in the Saint-Pierre Cemetery of Aix-en-Provence.

== Legacy ==
According to Keith Bosley, Henri Brémond helped revive interest in the Thomistic Christian poetry of sonneteer Jean de La Ceppède, which was consigned to oblivion at the end of the Renaissance in France and remained so until 1915, when La Ceppède was mentioned in the first volume of Brémond's Histoire littéraire du Sentiment religieux en France. Since then, La Ceppède's poetry has experienced a revival. It has appeared in multiple poetry anthologies and several scholarly works have been written about its author.

== Works ==
- L'Inquiétude religieuse. Aubes et lendemains de conversion (1901)
- Âmes religieuses (1902)
- L'enfant et la vie (1902)
- Le Bienheureux Thomas More 1478-1535 (1904) as Sir Thomas More (1913) translated by Henry Child
- Le charme d'Athènes et autres essais (1905) with Jean and André Bremond
- Newman, essai de biographie psychologique (1906) and translations from J. H. Newman, as The Mystery of Newman (1907) translated by H. C. Corrance
- Gerbet (1907)
- La Littérature religieuse d'avant-hier et d'aujourd'hui (1908)
- La Provence mystique au XVIIe siècle: Antoine Yvan et Madeleine Martin (1908)
- Nicole (1909)
- L’évolution du clergé anglican (1909)
- Apologie pour Fénelon (1910),
- Sainte Chantal (1572-1641) (1912)
- Textes choisis de Bossuet (1913)
- Histoire littéraire du sentiment religieux en France depuis la fin des guerres de religion jusqu'à nos jours (from 1916 to 1936) 11 volumes, as A Literary History of Religious Thought in France (1928) translated by K. L. Montgomery
  - Five volumes. Complete and expanded. Éditions Jérôme Millon, 2006. 4700p. ISBN 2841371883.
- Anthologie des écrivains catholiques, prosateurs français du XVIIème siècle (1919) with Charles Grolleau
- Revue dominicaine (1920)
- Pour le Romantisme (1923)
- Les deux musiques de la prose (1924)
- Maurice Barrès (1924)
- Le roman et l'histoire d'une conversion. Ulric Guttinguer et Sainte-Beuve (1925)
- Manuel illustré de la littérature catholique en France de 1870 à nos jours (1925) with others
- Entretiens avec Paul Valéry (1926) with Frédéric Lefevre
- Sainte Catherine d'Alexandrie (1926)
- La Poésie pure; Un débat sur la poésie. La poésie et les poètes (1926) with Robert de Souza
- Prière et Poésie (1926) as Prayer and Poetry: A Contribution To Poetical Theory (1927) translated by Algar Thorold
- Introduction à la philosophie de la prière (1928)
- L'Abbé Tempête: Armand de Rancé, Réformateur de la Trappe (1929) as The Thundering Abbot (1930) translated by F. J. Sheed
- Divertissements devant l'arche (1930)
- Racine et Valéry. Notes sur l'initiation poétique (1930)
- Un clerc qui n'a pas trahi: Alfred Loisy d'après ses mémoires (1931)
- La querelle du pur amour au temps de Louis XIII. Antoine Sirmond et Jean-Pierre Camus (1932)
- Autour de l'humanisme d'Érasme à Pascal (1936)
- Correspondance (1970) letters to Maurice Blondel, edited by André Blanchet, Aubier, two volumes
