= Charles Périn =

Belgian economist and lawyer

Charles Périn (25 August 1815 – 4 April 1905) was a Belgian political economist and lawyer.
