= Theology of Pope Leo XIII =

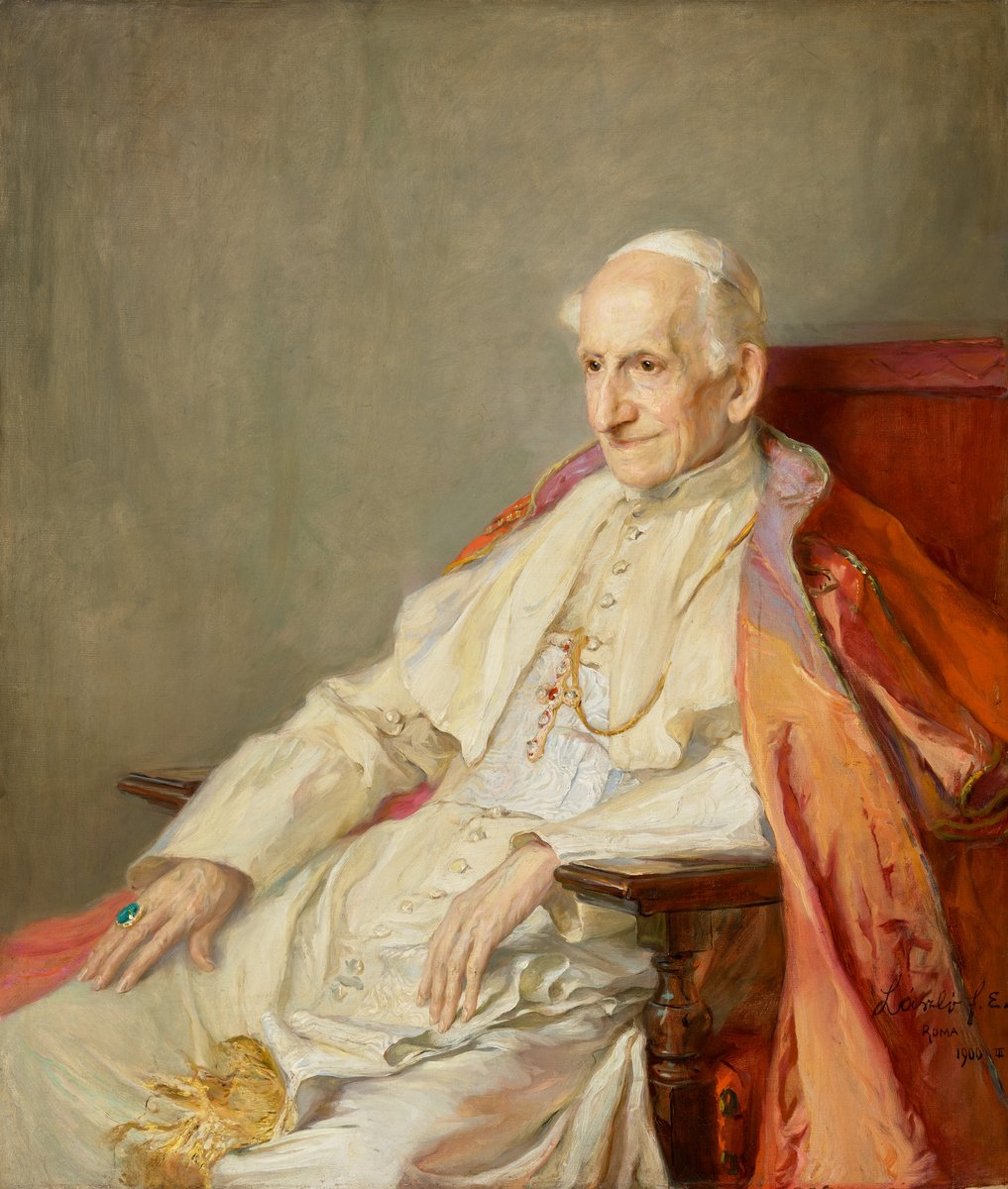
Portrait of Pope Leo XIII by Philip de László, 1900

The theology of Pope Leo XIII was influenced by the ecclesial teachings of the First Vatican Council (1869-1870), which had ended only eight years before his election in 1878. Leo issued some 46 apostolic letters and encyclicals dealing with central issues in the areas of marriage and family and state and society.

== Thomism ==
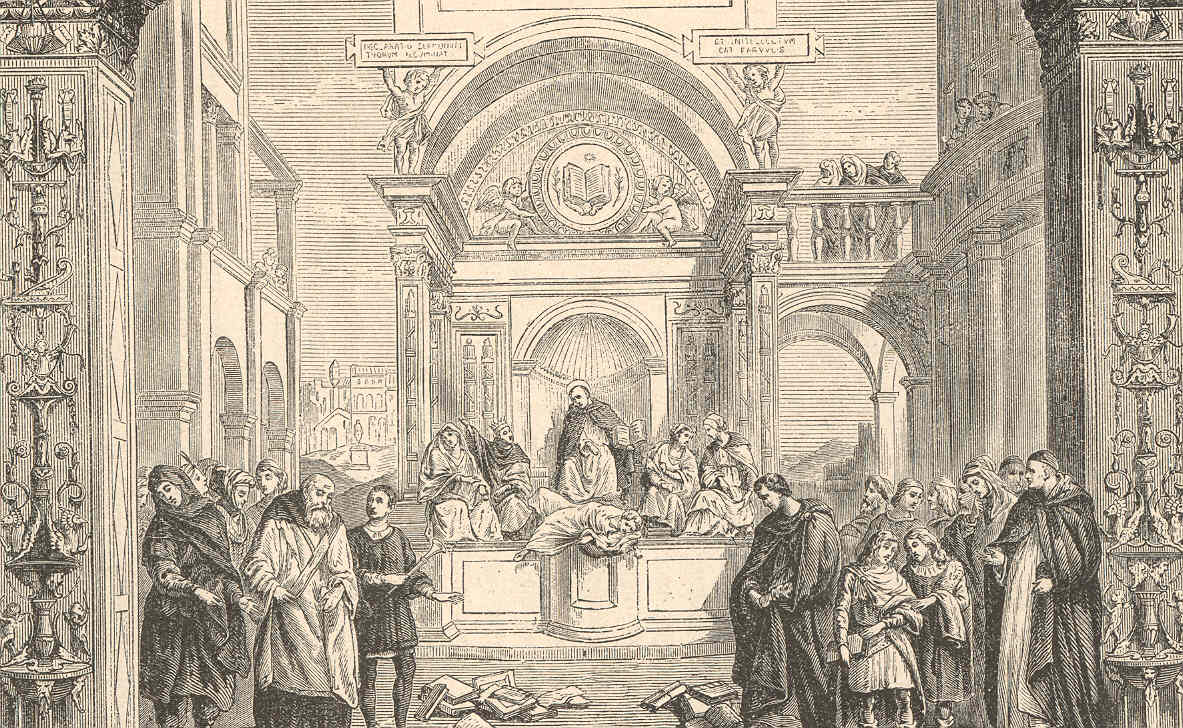
Illustration of Thomas Aquinas. Pope Leo XIII recommended Thomas Aquinas as a model for theological and philosophical studies.

As Pope, Pope Leo XIII used all his authority for a revival of Thomism, the theology of Thomas Aquinas. On 4 August 1879, Leo promulgated the encyclical Aeterni Patris ("Eternal Father") which, more than any other single document, provided a charter for the revival of Thomism—the medieval theological system based on the thought of Aquinas—as the official philosophical and theological system of the Catholic Church. It was to be normative not only in the training of priests at church seminaries but also in the education of the laity at universities. To that end Leo also sponsored the start of a definitive critical edition of the works of Aquinas.

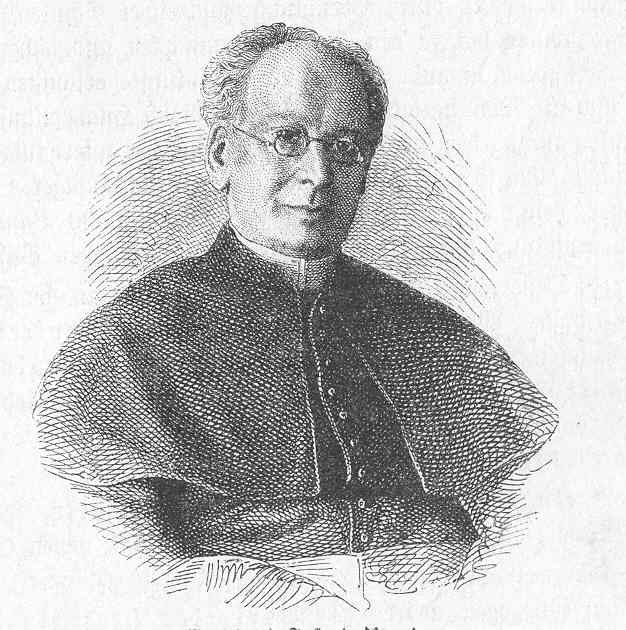
At the urgent requests of the College of Cardinals, Leo XIII in 1879 elevated his brother, Giuseppe Pecci, a Jesuit and prominent Thomist theologian, into their ranks.

In Aeterni Patris, Leo recommended Thomas Aquinas as a model for theological and philosophical studies. Thomism had lost its old role as leading theology and Leo attempted to re-establish it "for the protection of faith, welfare of society and the advancement of science". He envisaged not sterile interpretations of it, but a going back to the original sources. This new orientation at the beginning of his pontificate was welcomed by Dominicans, Thomist Jesuits like Giuseppe Pecci and numerous bishops throughout the world. There was also strong opposition which developed on several fronts within the Church, some considering Thomism simply outdated. Others, on the other hand, used it for petty condemnations of dissident views they did not like. The Jesuits and the Dominicans, traditional antagonists, both claimed leadership in the renewal of Catholic theology.

Leo responded by mandating all Catholic Universities to teach Thomism and by creating a papal academy for the training of Thomists professors and re-editing the scholarly editions of Thomas Aquinas. Leo was responsible for raising the University of Santo Tomas, Manila which is the oldest existing in Asia into a "Pontifical University". The leadership of this academy he entrusted to Giuseppe Pecci, who aided the creation of similar Thomas Aquinas academies in other places such as Bologna, Freiburg (Switzerland), Paris and Lowden. In 1879 Pecci was appointed as first Prefect of the still existing Pontifical Academy of St. Thomas Aquinas Pontificia Accademia Di San Tommaso D'Aquino, which Pope Leo founded on 15 October 1879. Leo XIII appointed thirty members, ten each from Rome, Italy and the world, and provided generous financial support to attract scholars from everywhere. The Pope personally supported individual Thomist scholars and applauded numerous text-critical editions of the Doctor Angelicus.

== Scripture ==
In his 1893 encyclical Providentissimus Deus, he described the importance of scriptures for theological study. It was an important encyclical for Catholic theology and its relation to the Bible, as Pope Pius XII pointed out fifty years later in his encyclical Divino Afflante Spiritu. In Providentissimus Deus, Leo gave new encouragement to Bible study while warning against rationalist interpretations which deny the inspiration of Scripture:

"For all the books which the Church receives as sacred and canonical, are written wholly and entirely, with all their parts, at the dictation of the Holy Ghost: and so far is it from being possible that any error can co-exist with inspiration, that inspiration not only is essentially incompatible with error, but excludes and rejects it as absolutely and necessarily as it is impossible that God Himself, the supreme Truth, can utter that which is not true." (Providentissimus Deus)

== Theological research ==
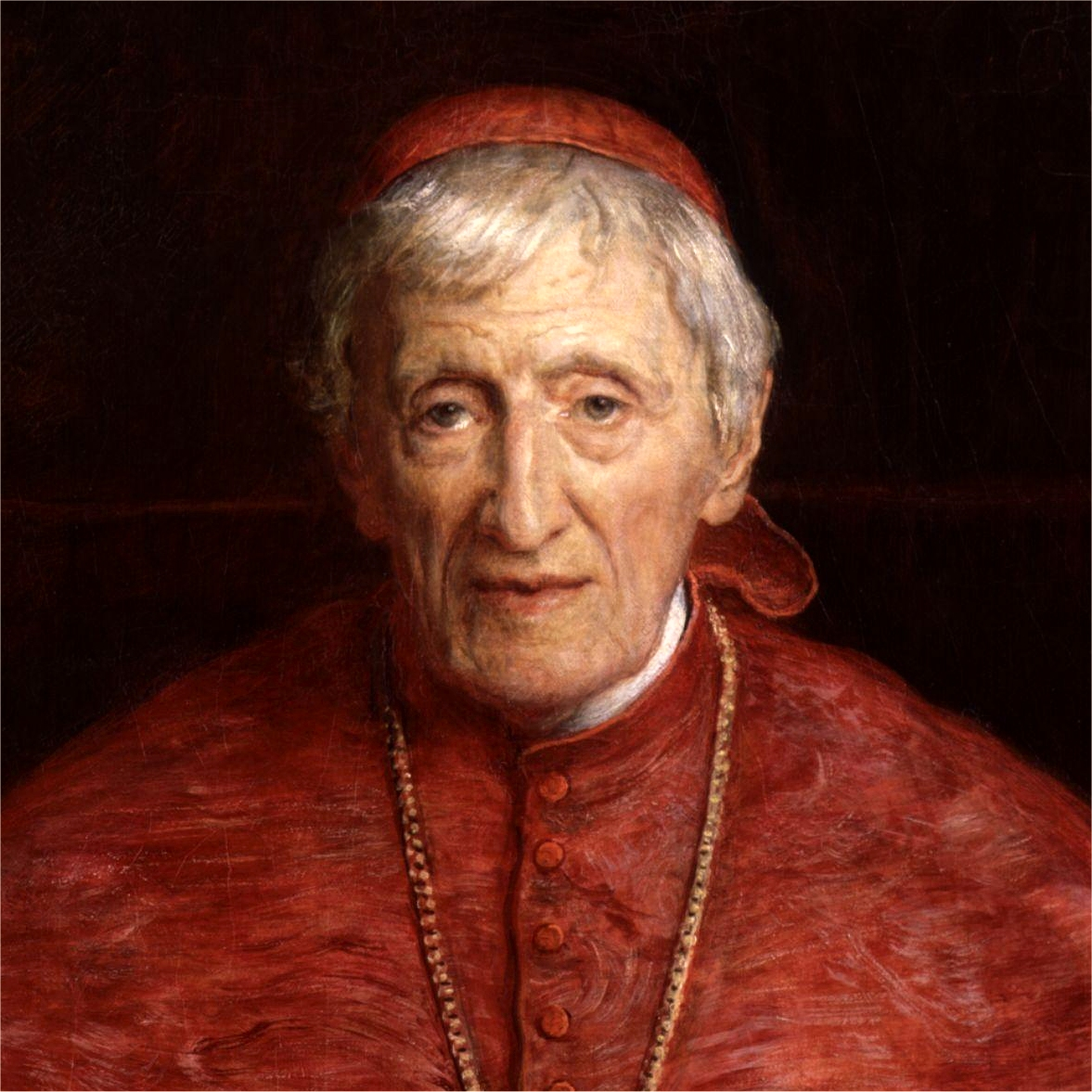
John Henry Newman

Leo XIII is credited with great efforts in the areas of scientific and historical analysis. He opened the Vatican Archives and personally fostered a twenty-volume comprehensive scientific study of the Papacy by Ludwig von Pastor, an Austrian historian. He entrusted the Dominican order with a text critical edition of the collective works of Thomas Aquinas, and furthered the career of noted scholars like Franz Ehrle and John Henry Newman, whom he elevated to the College of Cardinals. He founded the Catholic University of America in 1889.

His 1899 apostolic letter Testem benevolentiae nostrae condemned Americanism, an alleged American modernistic view holding that the teachings of the Church must be adapted to American society. Leo condemned the views that Catholic dogmas, which seemed to be contrary to the American experience, should be left out, and that natural virtues are more important than supernatural ones. American bishops led by Cardinal James Gibbons of Baltimore thanked him and expressed gratitude for setting the record straight. Gibbons, however, pointed out that no Catholic in the United States held those views.

When, at the end of the pontificate of Leo XIII in 1903, the papacy had regained much of its prestige and authority, his theological teachings were given much credit.

== Consecration of the world to the Sacred Heart ==
Since about 1850, various congregations and States had consecrated themselves to the Sacred Heart, and, in 1875, this consecration was made throughout the Catholic world.

In June 1898, Leo received a letter from the superior of a Good Shepherd nun, Mary of the Divine Heart stating that in a vision of Jesus Christ she had been told to request the consecration of the entire world to the Sacred Heart. The Pontiff did not believe the nun at first, but upon receiving a second letter in January 1899, he commissioned an inquiry on the basis of her revelation and church tradition. In his 1899 encyclical letter Annum sacrum, Leo XIII decreed that the consecration of the entire human race to the Sacred Heart of Jesus should take place on June 11, 1899. He called this "the greatest act of my pontificate". Annum sacrum also included the Prayer of Consecration to the Sacred Heart which Leo had composed.

Leo XIII's consecration of the entire world to the Sacred Heart of Jesus presented theological challenges by consecrating non-Christians as well.

== Ecumenical efforts ==
Pope Leo XIII fostered ecumenical relations, particularly with the East. He opposed efforts to Latinize the Eastern Rite Churches, stating that they constitute a most valuable ancient tradition and symbol of the divine unity of the Catholic Church. His 1894 encyclical Praeclara Gratulationis praised the cultural and liturgical diversity of expressions of faith within the Church. In Orientalum Dignitatis he repeated the need to preserve and cultivate diversity. On 29 June 1896, Leo XIII issued the encyclical Satis cognitum, in which he invited "separated" brothers and sisters to join the Catholic Church.

Major conversions continued in England during Leo's pontificate under the influence of Cardinal John Henry Newman. Efforts to draw the Anglican communities closer to the Catholic Church experienced a setback in 1896. The Vatican announced, following historical analysis, that the apostolic succession of Anglican Bishops was not completely secured, meaning that some Anglican episcopal ordinations were not valid. However, Leo managed to improve relations with the Orthodox Church with his open approach.

The 1896 bull Apostolicae curae declared the ordination of deacons, priests, and bishops in Anglican churches (including the Church of England) invalid, while granting recognition to ordinations in the Eastern Orthodox and Oriental Orthodox churches although they were considered illicit.

== Mariology ==
The Mariology of Pope Leo XIII continued the work of Pope Pius IX in emphasizing the importance of Marian devotion in Catholic teaching and practice. Leo XIII, in light of his unprecedented promulgation of the rosary in twelve encyclicals, was called Rosary Pope. In twelve encyclicals on the rosary he promulgates Marian devotion. In his encyclical on the fiftieth anniversary of the Dogma of the Immaculate Conception, he stresses her role in the redemption of humanity, mentioning Mary as Mediatrix and Co-Redemptrix.

== Social teachings ==
Leo XIII worked to encourage understanding between the Church and the modern world, though he preferred a cautious view on freedom of thought, stating that "is quite unlawful to demand, defend, or to grant unconditional freedom of thought, or speech, of writing or worship, as if these were so many rights given by nature to man" Leo's social teachings are based on the Catholic premise, that God is the Creator of the world and its Ruler. Eternal law commands the natural order to be maintained, and forbids that it be disturbed; men's destiny is far above human things and beyond the earth.

Human nature is stained by original sin, and is therefore more disposed to vice than to virtue. He opposed notions of marriage as a commercial contract, divorce, and education without religion, a State without God. He rejected some forms of egalitarianism: "People differ in capacity, skill, health, strength; and unequal fortune is a necessary result of unequal condition.

Such inequality is far from being disadvantageous either to individuals or to the community." All men are equal in regard to their common origin and nature, or the last end which each one has to attain, or the rights and duties which are thence derived. Leo XIII predicts that if state authorities do not heed these eternal truths, if they permit "the fear of God and reverence for divine laws being taken away", overthrow of the existing order and of the authorities themselves will occur.

Attempts are under way, he claims, by communists, socialists and Freemasons. But, whoever strive against the order which Divine Providence has constituted pay usually the penalty of their pride, and meet with affliction and misery where they rashly hoped to find all things prosperous and in conformity with their desires. Obedience to God is a teaching which supports civil authorities, because Church teaching about the divine origin of authority civil authority, and fosters obedience to it.

== See also ==
- List of Encyclicals of Pope Leo XIII
