= Ernesto Buonaiuti =

Italian historian and philosopher

Ernesto Buonaiuti (June 25, 1881 – April 20, 1946) was an Italian historian, philosopher of religion, former Catholic priest and anti-fascist. He lost his chair at the University of Rome owing to his opposition to the Fascists. As a scholar in History of Christianity and religious philosophy he was one of the most important exponents of the modernist current.

== Life ==
Buonaiuti was born in Rome on April 24, 1881. He was ordained priest on December 19, 1903, and began his studies working with the historian of religion Salvatore Minocchi. He had been a student of the Italian Marxist philosopher Antonio Labriola at the University of Rome. He made use of the positive method in his study of early Christianity in his book Il cristianesimo primitivo e la Politica imperiale romana ("Primitive Christianity and Roman Imperial Politics", 1911). From 1906 to 1908 he was the archivist of the Sacred Congregation of Apostolic Visitation.

He founded the magazine Rivista storico-critica delle scienze teologiche ("Historical-critical Review of the Theological Sciences"), and was its director from 1905 to 1910. After that he directed the magazine Ricerche religiose ("Religious Researches"). Those magazines were soon banned by the church and placed on the Index Librorum Prohibitorum, the index of publications to be considered as forbidden to Catholic readers.

On January 25, 1925, he was excommunicated, which was confirmed several times, because in his works he defended the ideas of modernism, particularly in Il programma dei modernisti ("The Modernists' Program", 1908) and Lettere di un prete modernista ("Letters from a Modernist Priest", 1908).

From 1925 he was Professor of History of Christianity at the University of Rome; however, after the Lateran Treaty in 1929, the university forbade him to teach and to examine students, and he was given non-academic tasks, such as library investigation and the writing of research papers. In 1931 his university chair was definitively revoked, because he refused to swear the "oath of loyalty" to Fascism (all teachers were forced by law to swear an oath of loyalty to the Fascist government, and those who refused were fired).

In his autobiography Il pellegrino di Roma ("The Pilgrim from Rome", 1945), Buonaiuti reconstructed the history of his conflict with the Catholic Church, of which he continued to claim himself a "loyal son", even after his excommunication.

In 1945, after the Allied victory in the Second World War he was restored to his rank of university professor, but he was not allowed to give lectures, since, according to the bureaucracy and the laws resulting from the Concordat, which were retained by the new government, teaching in any Italian State University was forbidden to any excommunicated priest.

He died on April 20, 1946, in Rome.

He was honoured as Righteous among the nations (n°12380) in 2012 for hiding Jews in German/fascist controlled Rome, while isolated by excommunication.

== Works ==
The complete works of Buonaiuti are very extensive: he wrote more than three thousand works, including books and articles, among them the ponderous Storia del Cristianesimo ("History of Christianity") in three volumes, his autobiography (Il pellegrino di Roma) and many studies about Gioacchino da Fiore (Gioacchino da Fiore: i tempi, la vita, il messaggio) and Martin Luther (Lutero e la riforma in Germania).

=== Storia del Cristianesimo ===
The three books of Storia del Cristianesimo were published between 1942 and 1943; the first volume is about ancient times, the second is about the Middle Ages and the third is about the modern era. It is considered Buonaiuti's most significant academic work. As he himself wrote in his autobiography of 1945, the work was motivated by apologetic reasons: "in order to draw up the definitive balance-sheet of Christian action in history, now that from a thousand signs one could easily and certainly deduce that Christianity was approaching its hour of dramatic expiration".

The main theme of the work revolves around the mystic and moral character of Christianity and its subsequent transformation into a philosofico-theological system and a bureaucratic organization. In Buonaiuti's view, the main religions are not speculative views of the world or rational schematizations of reality, but normative indications of a set of pre-rational and spiritual behaviours. Christianity, born as an announcement of palingenesis, implied a huge social program "which imposed a progressive conceptual enrichment and an increasingly rigid disciplinary organization. To live and bear fruit in the world, Christianity was condemned to lose its nature and degenerate" (Storia del cristianesimo, I, p. 15 and seq.). The only chance of salvation for the Church and all of modern society is, in Buonaiuti's view, the restoration of the elementary values of primitive Christianity: love, pain, regret, death.

=== Il Pellegrino di Roma (also La generazione dell'esodo) ===
The title of this autobiographical work, published in Rome in 1945, cites a definition that the Italian historian Luigi Salvatorelli gave of him, entitling one of his essays "Ernesto Buonaiuti, pellegrino di Roma" to emphasize Buonaiuti's love for the Catholic Church, despite the grave disciplinary sanctions he had to face (La Cultura, XII, 1933, pp. 375–391). Buonaiuti claims as his own two works of a modernist tendency published anonymously in 1908: Lettere di un prete modernista ("Letters from a Modernist Priest"), which he considered "a youth's sin", and Il Programma dei Modernisti ("The Modernists' Program"). His modernist positions are motivated by scientific reasons (Biblical criticism and exegesis). Initially his modernism seemed similar to the positions of Protestant liberal theologians like Albrecht Ritschl and Adolf von Harnack; however, after researching spirituality in the ancient world, from Zarathustra to the Greek tragedians, Buonaiuti began to recognize in pre-Christian spiritual experiences an anticipation of the Christian view of life. Buonaiuti claimed to be Catholic and to want to stay so usque dum vivam ("as long as I live"), as he wrote to the theology faculty of the University of Lausanne, which had offered him a chair in History of Christianity if he joined the Calvinist Church.

== Buonaiuti and John XXIII ==
Buonaiuti was an exact contemporary in Rome with Angelo Giuseppe Roncalli, who was elected to the papacy as John XXIII in 1958. According to Roncalli's biographer Peter Hebblethwaite the two men were initially close friends, and this connection may have played a part in the future pope's abrupt removal from a seminary post early in his career, as well as in the "Suspected of Modernism" entry which was made against Roncalli's name in his official record in the Vatican archives, something he would later refute by inserting, in his own hand "I, Pope John XXIII, have never been a Modernist".

== Portrayal in film ==
Ricky Tognazzi's 2003 film The Good Pope has a character called Nicola Catania who is loosely based on Buonaiuti, although a certain amount of licence is employed. The movie has Catania, a priest deposed for Modernism, keeping vigil in St. Peter's Square as John XXIII, who had been his friend in the seminary lies dying. In actuality, Buonaiuti died in 1946 and Roncalli in 1963.

== See also ==
- Joachim of Fiore
