= Oath Against Modernism =

Catholic oath, 1910–1967

Sacrorum antistitum Latin for 'Bishop' Motu proprio of Pope Pius X
- Signature date: 1 September 1910
- Subject: Modernism
- Text: In Latin
- AAS: 2 (17): 655-680

The Oath Against Modernism was a formal oath instituted by Pope Pius X in his motu proprio Sacrorum antistitum on September 1, 1910. The oath was required of "all clergy, pastors, confessors, preachers, religious superiors, and professors in philosophical-theological seminaries" of the Catholic Church. It remained in force until the Congregation for the Doctrine of the Faith, with the approval of Paul VI, replaced it (along with the Tridentine Profession of Faith) with a revised profession of faith in 1967.

The oath marked the culmination of Pius X's campaign against the theological movement of Modernism, which he analyzed and denounced as heretical in his 1907 encyclicals Pascendi Dominici gregis and Lamentabili sane exitu.

The Oath Against Modernism is still pronounced by the Society of Saint Pius X, and sedeprivationist and sedevacantist groups such as the Congregation of Mary Immaculate Queen and the Istituto Mater Boni Consilii.

== See also ==
- Ad tuendam fidem
- Humani generis
- Providentissimus Deus
