= Maurice Blondel =

French philosopher (1861–1949)

Servant of God Maurice Blondel
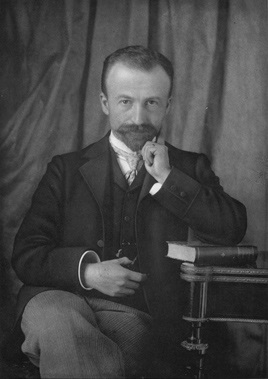
- Blondel in 1890
- Born: 2 November 1861; Dijon, France
- Died: 4 June 1949 (aged 87); Aix-en-Provence, France

Education
- Education: École Normale Supérieure
- Theses: De Vinculo substantiali et de substantia composita apud Leibnitium (On the Substantial Link and Compound Substance in Leibniz) (1893); Action: Essay on a Critique of Life and a Science of Practice (1893)
- Doctoral advisor: Émile Boutroux

Philosophical work
- Era: 19th-century philosophy
- Region: Western philosophy
- School: French spiritualism
- Institutions: University of Lille; University of Aix-Marseille
- Main interests: Philosophy of action Christian philosophy
- Notable ideas: Philosophy of action

Maurice Blondel (/blɒnˈdɛl/; French: [blɔ̃dɛl]; 2 November 1861 – 4 June 1949) was a French philosopher, whose most influential works, notably L'Action (1893), aimed at establishing the correct relationship between autonomous philosophical reasoning and Christian belief. He was a proponent of French spiritualism. His work was influential within the Catholic Church, particularly during the Second Vatican Council. The Catholic Church declared him a Servant of God in 2025.

== Biography ==
Blondel was born in Dijon, France, on 2 November 1861. He came from a family who were traditionally connected to the legal profession, but chose early in life to follow a career in philosophy. In 1881, he gained admission to the École Normale Supérieure of Paris. In 1893, he finished his thesis L'Action (Action), 'an essay on a critique of life and a science of practice'. He was at this time refused a teaching post (as would have been his due) because his philosophical conclusions were deemed to be too Christian and, therefore, "compromising" of philosophical reason. In 1895, however, with the help of his former teacher Émile Boutroux, he became a Maître de Conférences at Lille, then shortly after at Aix-en-Provence, where he became a professor in 1897. He would remain in Aix-en-Provence for the rest of his career.

In L'Action, Blondel developed a "philosophy of action" in which he applies the method of phenomenology. This leads him to the first order issue of "action", critiquing the Enlightenment enshrinement of thought, which he subsumes under the category of action. This leads him to discover the distinction between the willing will and the willed will. This distinction shows a real insufficiency between the two elements of the will. The problem of connaturality – that man cannot desire something which cannot be fulfilled – leads to investigating how the willing will can be fulfilled in the willed will. This insufficiency leads him to eventually hypothesize the supernatural as the only real possibility. He insists that this is as far as a philosopher can go, that the supernatural is the real end of man, and that the content of the supernatural is left to the realm of theology.

His subsequent works, the Letter on Apologetics and History and Dogma, were also connected to the philosophical problem of religion. They unleashed an enormous controversy at the time of publication. Pope Pius X's 1907 encyclical Pascendi dominici gregis targeted the Modernist threat to Catholic thought, and Blondel's thought remained associated (perhaps tenuously) with the Modernists. Blondel, however, was never the target of Pascendi and he received letters, through the Archbishop of Aix, from numerous Popes affirming he was not under suspicion. He did, however, have great influence on later Catholic thought, especially through ressourcement theologians such as Henri de Lubac.

His wife died in 1919, and in 1927, he retired for health reasons. Between 1934 and 1937, he published a trilogy dedicated to thought, being and action. In 1935, he published a book on concrete and integral ontology L'être et les êtres (The Being and the Beings) and in 1946 he published L'esprit chrétien (The Christian Spirit).

Blondel died in Aix-en-Provence, on 4 June 1949, aged 87. He was the younger brother of historian Georges Blondel and a first cousin of physicist André Blondel.

== Works ==
- L'Action: Essai d'une critique de la vie et d'une science de la pratique (Paris: Alcan, 1893); 2nd edn, Paris: PUF, 1950).
  - (in English) Action (1893): Essay on a Critique of Life and a Science of Practice, trans. Oliva Blanchette (Notre Dame: University of Notre Dame Press, 1984).
- Lettre sur les exigences de la pensée contemporaine en matiere d'aplogétique et sur la méthode de la philosophie dans l'étude du probleme religieux (1896) – commonly called La lettre in French, and the Letter on Apologetics in English
  - (in English) The letter on apologetics and History and dogma, edited and translated by Alexander Dru and Illtyd Trethowan (London: Harvill Press, 1964)
- History and Dogma (1904)
  - (in English) The letter on apologetics and History and dogma, edited and translated by Alexander Dru and Illtyd Trethowan (London: Harvill Press, 1964)
- L'être et les êtres – Essai d'ontologie concrète et intégrale (1935) [also PUF, 1963]
- L'ésprit chrétien (1946)
- Exigences philosophiques du christianisme (1950)
  - (in English) Philosophical Exigencies of Christian Religion, translated by Oliva Blanchette (Notre Dame: University of Notre Dame Press, 2021)
- Lettres philosophiques (Paris: Aubier, 1961)

A nine-volume edition of the complete works of Blondel is being published. Two volumes (as of 2013) have been published.

- Oeuvres completes, i, ed Claude Troisfontaines (Paris: PUF, 1995) [which contains L'Action, as well as a minor Latin thesis on Leibniz which accompanied L'Action in Blondel's doctoral submissions]
- Oeuvres completes, ii, 1888-1913: La philosophie de l'action et la crise moderniste, ed Claude Troisfontaines (Paris: PUF, 1997)

== See also ==
- Modernism in the Catholic Church
