= José de Calasanz Vives y Tutó =

Spanish author

His Eminence José de Calasanz Vives y Tutó OFMCap
- Prefect of the Congregation of religious
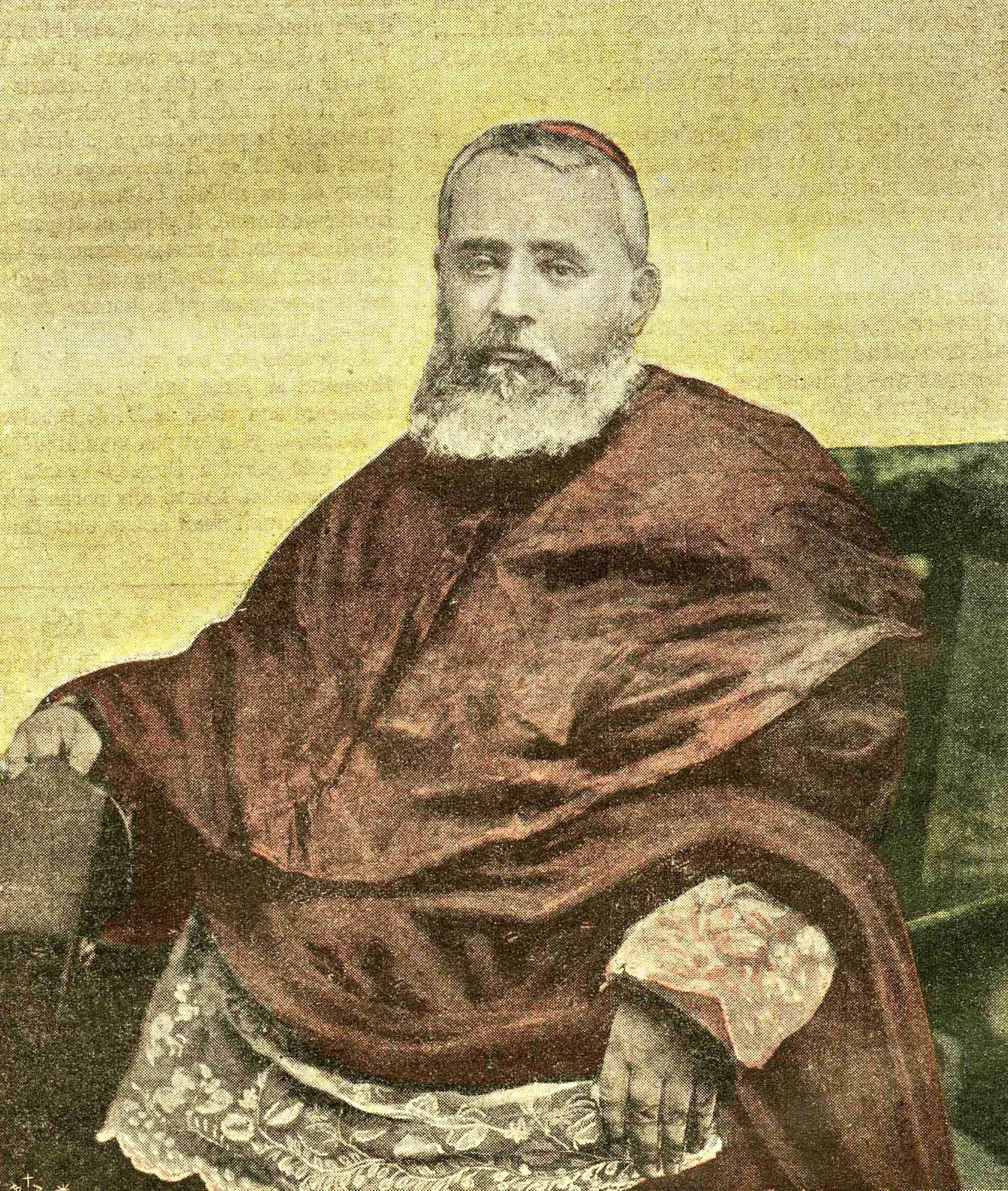
- Church: Roman Catholic Church
- Appointed: 26 October 1908
- Term ended: 7 September 1913
- Predecessor: None - office created
- Successor: Ottavio Cagiano de Azevedo
- Other post: Cardinal-Deacon of Sant'Adriano al Foro (1899-1913)

Orders
- Ordination: 26 May 1877 by Florian-Jules-Félix Desprez
- Created cardinal: 19 June 1899 by Pope Leo XIII
- Rank: Cardinal-Deacon

Personal details
- Born: José de Calasanz Félix Jaime Vives y Tutó; 15 February 1854 Sant Andreu de Llavaneres, Barcelona, Spain
- Died: 7 September 1913 (aged 59) Monte Porzio Catone, Frascati, Kingdom of Italy
- Buried: Campo Verano (1913-2010)
- Parents: José Vives y Comas; Catalina Tutó y Garriga
- Education: University of Santa Clara

José de Calasanz, or in Catalan Calassanç , born José Vives y Tutó (or, in Catalan, Josep Vives i Tutó); his given name is written in English as Joseph Calasanz), OFMCap (15 February 1854 – 7 September 1913), was an influential Spanish Roman Catholic theologian, member of the Capuchin friars and from 19 June 1899 also cardinal. To distinguish him from the saint Giuseppe Calasanzio from whom he took his name, he is known as either José de Calasanz Vives y Tutó or Cardinal Calasanz.

Initially studying as a boy with the priest of the Scuole Pie, he then directly entered the Capuchin order. In 1869–1870, he was in the novitiate while in Guatemala, but social disorder and anticlericalism led to him to flee to France. He was sent back to the Americas by the order, but by 1880 he was in a monastery of Igeselda in Spain. He was sent by the order to Rome to discuss the disunion among Capuchin branches. This led, in 1899, to having Pope Leo XIII name him cardinal.

He was involved in the elaboration of church doctrines and canon law; as an ally of the conservative and reactionary Cardinals Rafael Merry del Val and Gaetano de Lai, he remained influential with Pope Pius X.

In 1908, he became the first Prefect of what is now known as the Congregation for Institutes of Consecrated Life and Societies of Apostolic Life, and held the position until his death. He was well known for his traditionalist position.

His health deteriorated in 1913 with peritonitis and he died in September that year at the age of 59.
