= Pascendi Dominici gregis =

Papal encyclical promulgated by Pope Pius X

Pascendi Dominici gregis Latin for 'The Feedings of the Flock of the Lord' Encyclical of Pope Pius X
- Signature date: 8 September 1907
- Subject: Modernism in the Catholic Church
- Number: 11 of 17 of the pontificate
- Text: In Latin; In English

Pascendi Dominici gregis (English: Feeding the Lord's Flock) is a papal encyclical letter, subtitled "On the Doctrines of the Modernists", promulgated by Pope Pius X on 8 September 1907.

== Context ==
Pius X viewed the church as under siege, intellectually from rationalism and materialism, politically from liberalism and anti-clericalism. The pope condemned modernism, a loose movement of Catholic biblical scholars, philosophers and theologians who believed that the church could not ignore new modernist interpretations concerning the Bible. Modernist nun Maude Petre FCM would later recall, "We must remember, in fairness to those who were not always fair, that the impact of historical criticism on the traditional teaching of the Church was terrifying; that it seemed a case of saving the very essence of the Christian faith from destruction".

Alfred Loisy held that only scientific exegesis is verifiable and therefore, reliable. Interpretation based on faith, on the other hand, "is a purely subjective". This discounts entirely the value of revelation. Concerning Jesus, "In the person of Christ, they say, science and history encounter nothing that is not human. Therefore, in virtue of the first canon deduced from agnosticism, whatever there is in His history suggestive of the divine, must be rejected". The threat was seen as more severe as appearing to come from a member of the ordained clergy.

Much of the encyclical was drafted by Joseph Lemius OMI, Procurator General of the Oblates of Mary Immaculate, and Cardinal José de Calasanz Vives y Tutó OFMCap.

It condemned the proposition that religion is merely a sentiment based on a psychological need for the divine. The fundamental error attributed to the modernists was that of denying the capacity of reason to know the truth, thereby reducing everything – including religion, and including Christianity – to subjective experience. Modernists rejected this interpretation, saying their focus was on historical criticism of sacred texts.

Following the example of the bishops of Umbria, Pius X directed the bishops to establish councils to look into any errors being promoted in their dioceses and to inform the bishop thereof, with particular attention given to the curriculum and texts used in the seminaries and schools. It also reiterated a 1896 decree of the Congregation for Indulgences and Sacred Relics that "Ancient relics are to retain the veneration they have always enjoyed except when in individual instances there are clear arguments that they are false or suppositions.' If however, the bishop knows the relic is not authentic, it is to be withdrawn from veneration, and if authentication has been lost due to civil disturbances, no relic may be presented for public veneration before the bishop has verified it.
