= Michael Corrigan =

Roman Catholic Archbishop of New York (1839-1902)

The Most Reverend Michael Corrigan
- Archbishop of New York
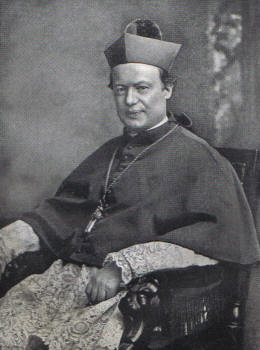
- Church: Catholic Church
- Archdiocese: New York
- Appointed: October 10, 1885
- Term ended: May 5, 1902
- Predecessor: John McCloskey
- Successor: John Murphy Farley
- Previous posts: President of Seton Hall College (1868–1876); Bishop of Newark (1873–1880); Coadjutor Archbishop of New York (1880–1885); Titular Archbishop of Petra (1880–1885)

Orders
- Ordination: September 19, 1863 by Costantino Patrizi Naro
- Consecration: May 4, 1873 by John McCloskey

Personal details
- Born: August 13, 1839 Newark, New Jersey, U.S.
- Died: May 2, 1902 (aged 62) New York City, U.S.
- Buried: St. Patrick's Cathedral
- Education: Mount St. Mary's College (BA); Pontificio Collegio Urbano de Propaganda Fide (DD)
- Motto: Dominus Petra Mea (Latin for 'The Lord Is My Rock')
- Coat of arms

Michael Augustine Corrigan (August 13, 1839 – May 5, 1902) was an American Catholic prelate who served as the third Archbishop of New York from 1885 to 1902. He previously served as Bishop of Newark (1873–1880) before becoming coadjutor archbishop under Cardinal John McCloskey, whom Corrigan succeeded upon his death. He also served as president of Seton Hall University from 1868 to 1876.

Corrigan was widely considered to have been one of the most influential conservatives in the Catholic Church in the United States in the late 19th century. He strongly opposed Americanism and was involved in widely publicized feuds with liberal figures like John Ireland and Edward McGlynn.

== Early life and education ==
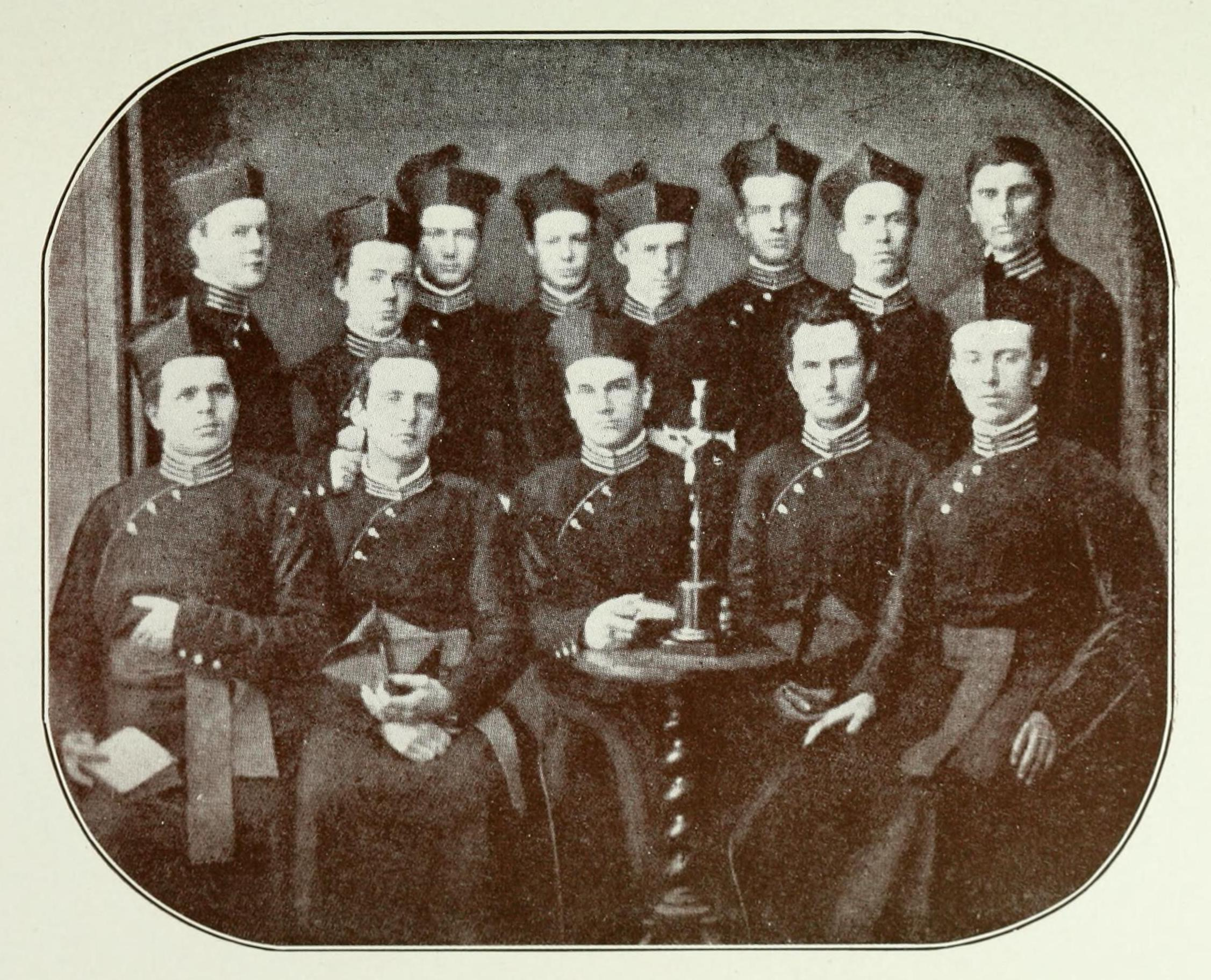
The inaugural class of the Pontifical North American College, Rome (1859). Corrigan is fourth from left, back row.

Michael Augustine Corrigan was born on August 13, 1839, in Newark, New Jersey. His father, Thomas Corrigan, was born in Kells, County Meath, Ireland, and worked as an indentured cabinetmaker in Dublin before coming to the United States. His mother, Mary Corrigan (née English), was also an Irish immigrant, having been born in Kingscourt, County Cavan. Michael was the fifth of their nine children; his only sister, Catherine, became an Augustinian nun and two brothers, James and George, also became priests.

In Newark, Thomas Corrigan owned a retail grocery and liquor business and also bought real estate. Upon his death in 1867, he bequeathed Michael $100,000 (equivalent to $2.1 million in 2025). Michael received his early education at a private school in Newark run by his godfather. In 1853, he enrolled at St. Mary's College in Wilmington, Delaware, where he remained for two years. While there, he received confirmation from John Neumann, the Bishop of Philadelphia who was later canonized in 1977. He then attended Mount St. Mary's College in Emmitsburg, Maryland, graduating in 1859.

In the fall of 1859, after Corrigan decided to become a priest, he was sent by Bishop James Roosevelt Bayley of Newark to study at the Pontificio Collegio Urbano de Propaganda Fide in Rome. In December of that year, the Pontifical North American College opened as a residence for American seminarians in Rome. Corrigan was one of the first twelve students to enter the American College, along with Robert Seton (a cousin of Bishop Bayley and grandson of Elizabeth Ann Seton), Reuben Parsons, and Patrick William Riordan. Edward McGlynn, with whom Corrigan would later feud, served as their prefect.

== Priesthood ==
On September 19, 1863, Corrigan was ordained a priest by Costantino Patrizi Naro, the Cardinal Vicar, at the Lateran Basilica. He received the degree of Doctor of Divinity from the Pontificio Collegio Urbano the following year.

Upon his return to the United States in September 1864, Corrigan was appointed professor of dogmatic theology and Scripture at Immaculate Conception Seminary, part of Seton Hall College in South Orange, New Jersey. It was there that Corrigan was taken under the wing of Bernard John McQuaid, president of Seton Hall. They developed a lifelong friendship and would later emerge as the most prominent conservative leaders of the U.S. Catholic Church in the late 19th century. As one historian described their relationship:

The McQuaid-Corrigan relationship developed at Seton Hall and so highly did McQuaid esteem the mind and administrative talents of the young Corrigan, that rightly or wrongly, McQuaid later would claim credit for Corrigan's advancement: first to Seton Hall, then to Newark and finally his promotion to Archbishop of New York. After 1880, Corrigan was technically McQuaid's superior, but to the very end it remained the relationship of a former teacher to his pupil with McQuaid playing the role of friend, advisor and trusted confidant, who always encouraged Corrigan to act clearly, boldly and decisively.

In 1865, Corrigan was made vice president of the college and director of the seminary. Following the appointment of McQuaid as Bishop of Rochester, Corrigan became president of Seton Hall on June 24, 1868. In addition to his academic responsibilities, he also succeeded McQuaid as vicar general of the Diocese of Newark in October 1868.

In one of his early acts as president, Corrigan hired his brother James as director of the seminary. James would succeed his brother as president in 1876. Their brother George would be ordained a priest by Michael in 1874 and serve as professor of Christian apologetics and Greek. The Corrigan brothers were also critical to the college's financial solvency. Faced with rising debt, Bishop Bayley was prepared to sell Seton Hall to the Christian Brothers in 1871. However, the sale was avoided when Michael, James, and their brother Joseph raised the necessary funds, partly using their inheritances from their late father.

== Bishop of Newark ==
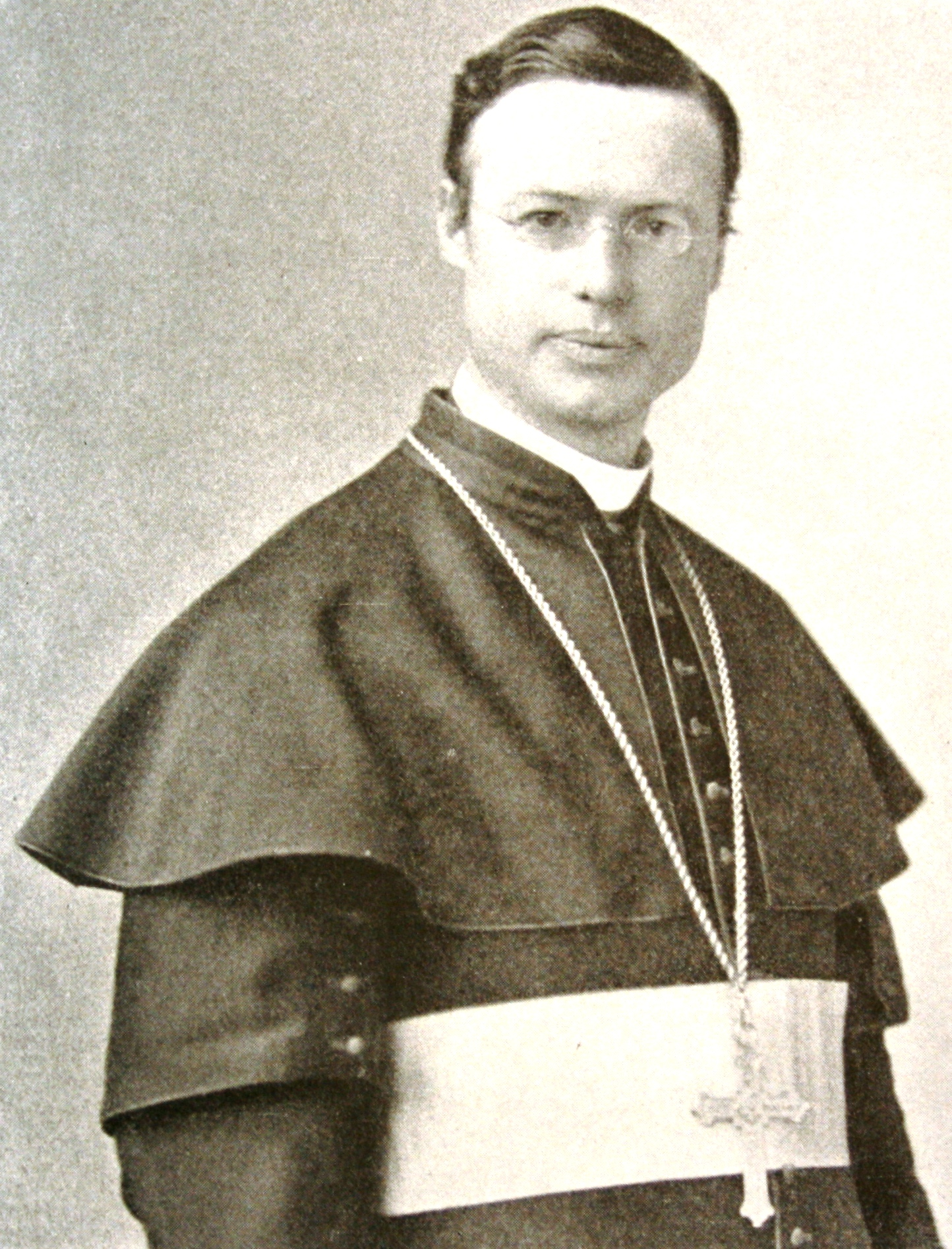
Michael Corrigan as a bishop.

After Bishop Bayley was appointed to the Archdiocese of Baltimore, Corrigan was named the second Bishop of Newark by Pope Pius IX on February 14, 1873. He received his episcopal consecration on the following May 4 from Archbishop John McCloskey at St. Patrick's Cathedral, with Bishops John Loughlin and William George McCloskey serving as co-consecrators. At age 34, he was the youngest Catholic bishop in the United States.

At the time, the Diocese of Newark comprised the entire state of New Jersey. In Corrigan's first full year as bishop, the diocese contained 116 priests and 109 churches to serve a Catholic population of 200,000. By the end of his tenure, there were 184 priests, 142 churches, and 175,000 Catholics. He established his official residence at Seton Hall, where he remained president until his resignation on June 19, 1876.

At the beginning of Corrigan's tenure, the state reform school for boys in Jamesburg was run by a Protestant minister and required all boys to attend Protestant services. After unsuccessful attempts to provide a Catholic chaplain, Corrigan established a protectory for boys at Denville in 1875. That same year, he also founded a school for wayward girls in Newark.

== Archbishop of New York ==
=== Coadjutor Archbishop ===
In 1880, Cardinal McCloskey of the Archdiocese of New York (who had consecrated Corrigan as a bishop) sought a coadjutor archbishop with the right of succession due to his declining health. McCloskey and his suffragan bishops submitted to Rome a terna, or list of candidates, that included Corrigan, Bishop Loughlin of the Diocese of Brooklyn (a co-consecrator of Corrigan), and Bishop Patrick Neeson Lynch of the Diocese of Charleston. Lynch was McCloskey's preference, but Rome was not favorable to his age or his support for the Confederacy during the Civil War. Thus, on October 1, 1880, Pope Leo XIII appointed Corrigan to be McCloskey's coadjutor and gave him the honorary position of titular archbishop of Petra.

Corrigan attended the third Plenary Council of Baltimore from November 9 to December 7, 1884. He took an active part in the proceedings and acted as a representative of Cardinal McCloskey, who did not attend. When the council approved the establishment of a Catholic university in the United States, Corrigan was appointed to the planning committee for what would eventually become the Catholic University of America.

=== Archbishop ===
When McCloskey died on October 10, 1885, Corrigan automatically succeeded him as the third Archbishop of New York. He presided over a period of significant growth for the archdiocese. In 1886, the first full year of his tenure, the archdiocese contained 402 priests, 176 churches, and 118 parochial schools to serve a Catholic population of 600,000. By the end of his seventeen years as archbishop, there were 716 priests, 276 churches, 190 parochial schools, and 1.2 million Catholics. One of his most significant accomplishments, described by The New York Times as "his crowning work," was the building of St. Joseph's Seminary and College in Yonkers, which opened in 1896.

==== School debate ====
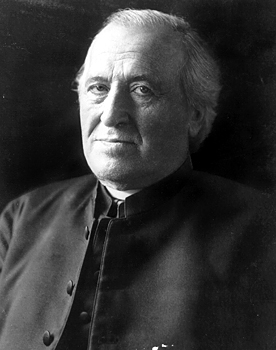
Archbishop John Ireland.

In the late 19th century, Corrigan was widely regarded as the "chief opponent" of Americanism, or attempts to adapt Catholic doctrine to American culture. This led to many public disputes between Corrigan and more liberal-minded bishops, especially with Archbishop John Ireland on the matter of Catholic education.

In 1890, Ireland expressed his support for the Poughkeepsie plan and implemented the plan in Faribault and Stillwater, Minnesota. Under this system, a public school district would control parochial schools during school hours while religious instruction occurred outside those hours. Corrigan was not opposed to the plan itself, as he allowed it in Poughkeepsie and elsewhere in New York. However, he did oppose "a certain new and foreign theory" espoused by Ireland and others "that state schools best suited the needs of our times." He strongly supported the Third Plenary Council of Baltimore's mandates for every Catholic parish to have a parochial school and for Catholic parents to send their children to those schools.

In April 1892, Leo XIII approved a decision by the Congregation for the Propagation of the Faith that the Faribault–Stillwater plan "can be tolerated." Both Corrigan and Ireland interpreted this decision as a victory, with Corrigan reading it as an exception while Ireland viewed it as an endorsement. After receiving a separate letter from the pope explaining his decision, Corrigan wrote to Cardinals Lucido Parocchi and Mieczysław Halka-Ledóchowski to point out factual inaccuracies in Leo's letter. This sparked outrage in Rome, leading Corrigan to issue a statement:

It is a cardinal principle of canon law that error when discovered is to be corrected, and supposing that by any inadvertence an error of fact crept into the letter of the Holy Father, there could have been no irreverence in respectfully pointing out the fact either to him or to others who later on are to exercise their judgment in the premises.

Ireland actively campaigned for the Republican Party in the 1894 New York state election. The election ended in a Republican victory along with the passage of the Blaine Amendment to the Constitution of New York, denying public funding to religious schools. Ireland's involvement in New York politics enraged Corrigan, who wrote to Cardinal James Gibbons:

Our Catholic population is indignant at the procedure of the Abp. of St. Paul, who, they say, was imported by the Republican party to aid them during the recent elections. If such a state of things continue, what is to become of Diocesan jurisdiction? Fancy e.g. my going to St. Paul, staying three weeks at the Ryan House without calling on the archbishop, then parading myself at political meetings, and giving Abp. Ireland's subjects pointed advice on the way they ought to vote!

When Leo XIII issued his 1899 apostolic letter Testem benevolentiae condemning Americanism, Corrigan praised the pope for exposing "the multiplicity of fallacies and errors" which some had sought to disguise "as good and Catholic doctrine." Ireland was angered by Corrigan questioning his orthodoxy, and wrote to Denis J. O'Connell in December 1899 to say, "Corrigan imagines he is forever 'cock of the walk.' Can you with any kind of stick haul him down?"

==== McGlynn conflict ====
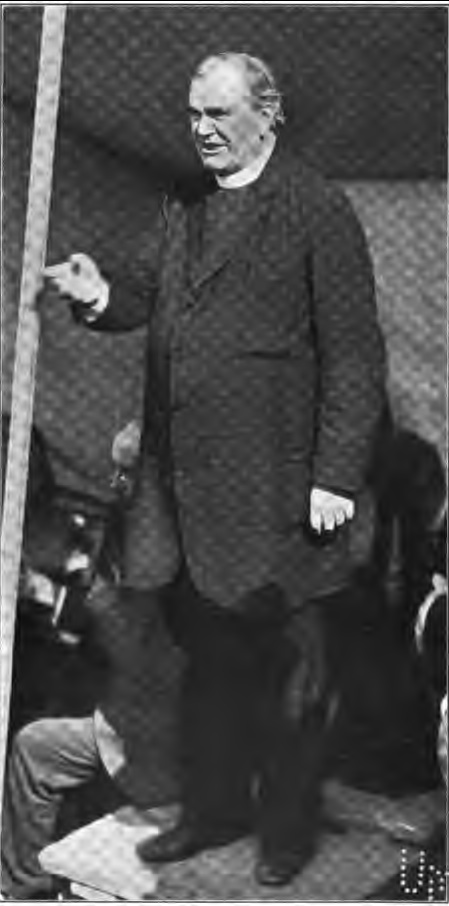
Edward McGlynn.

Corrigan's tenure as archbishop was marked by a six-year feud with Edward McGlynn, who had been his prefect at the Pontifical North American College. By 1886, McGlynn had become pastor of St. Stephen's Church in Manhattan and a strong supporter of economist Henry George. Corrigan believed that Georgism, which held that economic rent derived from land should belong equally to all members of society, was inconsistent with Catholic doctrine on an individual's right to private property.

In the 1886 New York City mayoral election, McGlynn actively campaigned for George, who had been nominated by the United Labor Party; future U.S. president Theodore Roosevelt was the Republican nominee. In September of that year, Corrigan prohibited McGlynn from speaking at an upcoming rally for George at Chickering Hall, "or to take part in the future in any political meeting whatever without the sanction of the Sacred Congregation of Propaganda Fide." When McGlynn refused to obey Corrigan's order, the archbishop suspended the priest for two weeks.

Shortly after George's defeat in the election, Corrigan issued a pastoral letter in which he condemned "certain unsound principles and theories which assail the rights of property." In response, McGlynn said in an interview, "So long as ministers of the gospel and priests of the Church tell hardworking people to be content with their lot and hope for good times in heaven, so long will skepticism increase and Bob Ingersoll have many believers." Corrigan, in turn, suspended McGlynn for the remainder of the year.

In January 1887, Corrigan removed McGlynn as pastor of St. Stephen's for insubordination. The following March, McGlynn delivered a speech at the Academy of Music, which was attended by several other priests. Corrigan responded by disciplining those priests, including Sylvester Malone, who subsequently said in an interview, "I have never agreed with Archbishop Corrigan's methods, but I cannot understand him now. His behavior is tyrannical, inhuman, and totally without reason or excuse." Meanwhile, 357 of the archdiocese's 413 priests signed a pledge of loyalty to Corrigan.

In May 1887, Cardinal Giovanni Simeoni wrote that McGlynn would be excommunicated if he did not come to Rome in forty days. When he refused the cardinal's orders, Corrigan declared in July that McGlynn had incurred excommunication. In January 1889, Corrigan declared that attending meetings of McGlynn's Anti-Poverty Society was a reserved sin, meaning that a confessor would have to obtain special faculties to absolve it. In February of that year, after Corrigan had petitioned Rome to place Henry George's Progress and Poverty on the Index of Forbidden Books, the Congregation of the Inquisition condemned George's teachings but withheld its decision from being published. This was followed in 1891 by Leo XIII's encyclical Rerum novarum, which affirmed private ownership as "the natural right of man" and rejected the concept that "individual possessions should become the common property of all."

Corrigan's feud with McGlynn lasted until December 1893, when Archbishop Francesco Satolli, as the first Apostolic Delegate to the United States, lifted McGlynn's excommunication and restored his priestly faculties. Corrigan subsequently appointed McGlynn as pastor of St. Mary’s Church in Newburgh, where he remained until his death in 1901.

== Death ==
In February 1902, Corrigan suffered a fall from which he never fully recovered. In the weeks that followed, he also developed pneumonia. On May 5, 1902, at the age of 62, he died at the archbishop's residence in Manhattan. He had marked the 29th anniversary of his episcopal consecration the day before.

Cardinal James Gibbons celebrated Corrigan's Requiem Mass at St. Patrick's Cathedral on May 9, with Archbishop Patrick John Ryan delivering the eulogy. He was interred in the crypt under the altar of St. Patrick's Cathedral.

== See also ==
- Archdiocese of New York#Ordinaries

== Sources ==
- Mooney, Joseph (1902). Memorial of the Most Reverend Michael Augustine Corrigan, D. D. New York: The Cathedral Library Association.
- Curran, Robert Emmett (1978). Michael Augustine Corrigan and the Shaping of Conservative Catholicism in America, 1878–1902. New York: Arno Press.
- Reilly, Daniel F. (1943). The School Controversy (1891-1893). Catholic University of America Press.

Catholic Church titles
Preceded by James Roosevelt Bayley	Bishop of Newark; 1873–1880	Succeeded by Winand Wigger
Preceded by –	Coadjutor Archbishop of New York; 1880–1885	Succeeded by –
Preceded by John McCloskey	Archbishop of New York; 1885–1902	Succeeded by John Murphy Farley
