= Patrick William Riordan =

Roman Catholic Archbishop of San Francisco, California (1841–1914)

The Most Reverend Patrick William Riordan
- Archbishop of San Francisco
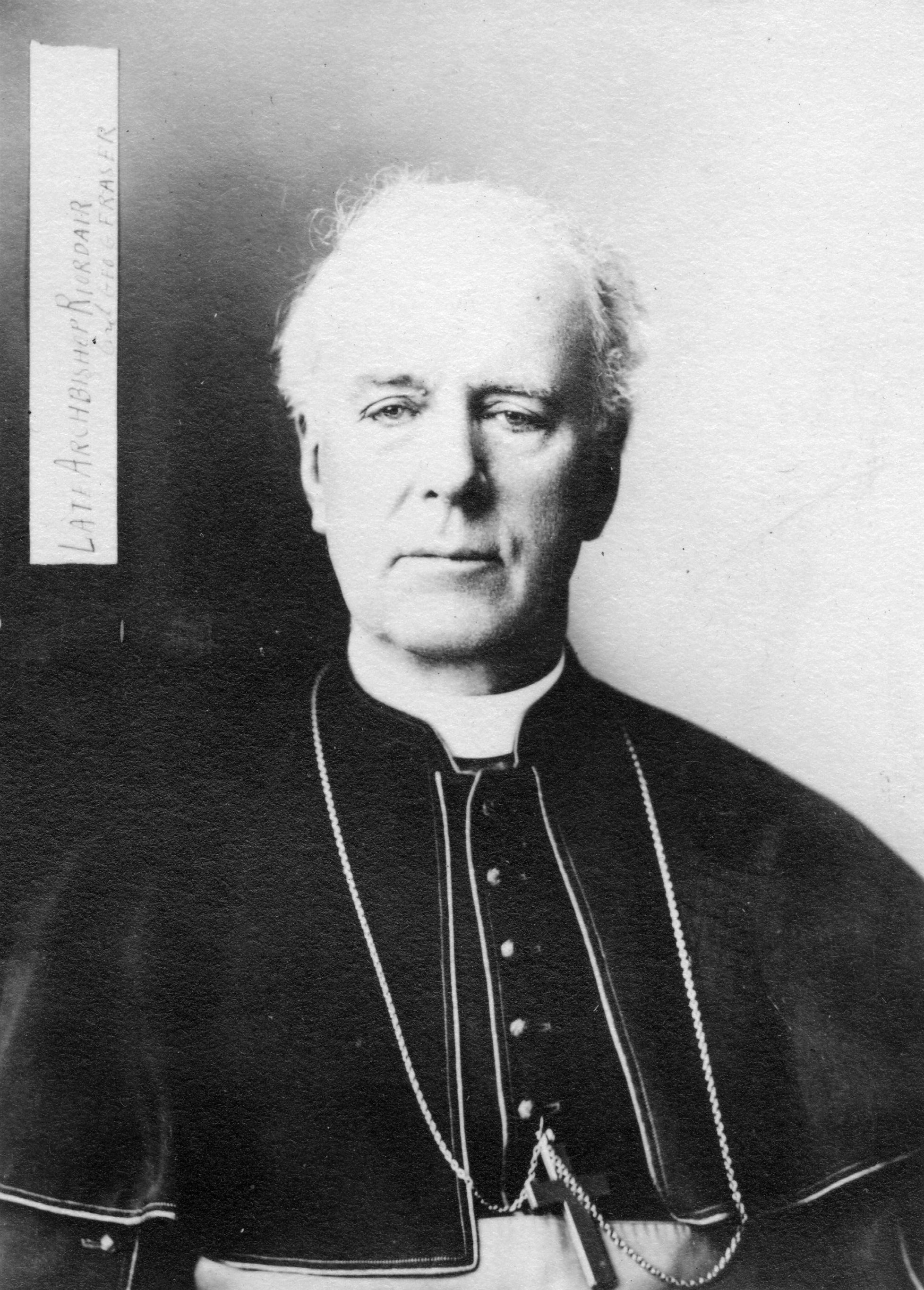
- Church: Catholic Church
- Archdiocese: Archdiocese of San Francisco
- Appointed: December 21, 1884
- Term ended: December 27, 1914 (his death)
- Predecessor: Joseph Sadoc Alemany
- Successor: Edward Joseph Hanna
- Other post: Coadjutor Archbishop of San Francisco (1883–1884)

Orders
- Ordination: June 10, 1865 by Engelbert Sterckx
- Consecration: September 16, 1883 by Patrick Feehan

Personal details
- Born: August 27, 1841 Chatham, New Brunswick, Canada
- Died: December 27, 1914 (aged 73) San Francisco, California, U.S.

Patrick William Riordan (August 27, 1841 – December 27, 1914) was a Canadian-born American prelate of the Catholic Church who served as archbishop of San Francisco in California from 1884 until his death in 1914. He served during the 1906 San Francisco earthquake, and he was a prominent figure in the first case submitted to the Permanent Court of Arbitration.

== Early life ==
Patrick Riordan was born on August 27, 1841, in Chatham in the British Province of New Brunswick in present-day Canada to Matthew and Mary (née Dunne) Riordan. His parents were both natives of Ireland, his father from Kinsale, County Cork, and his mother from Stradbally, County Laois. Soon after the birth of his sister Catherine in 1844, his parents returned to Ireland with their children; his brother Dennis was born there in 1846. However, the privations of the Great Famine soon forced the family to leave Ireland again. After a brief return to New Brunswick, they settled in Chicago, Illinois, in 1848.

As a boy in Chicago, Riordan established a lifelong friendship with John Ireland, the future Archbishop of Saint Paul. The Riordan family were parishioners at St. Patrick's Parish in Chicago. Patrick's uncle, Reverend Dennis Dunne, served as pastor there as well as vicar general of the Archdiocese of Chicago.

== Education ==
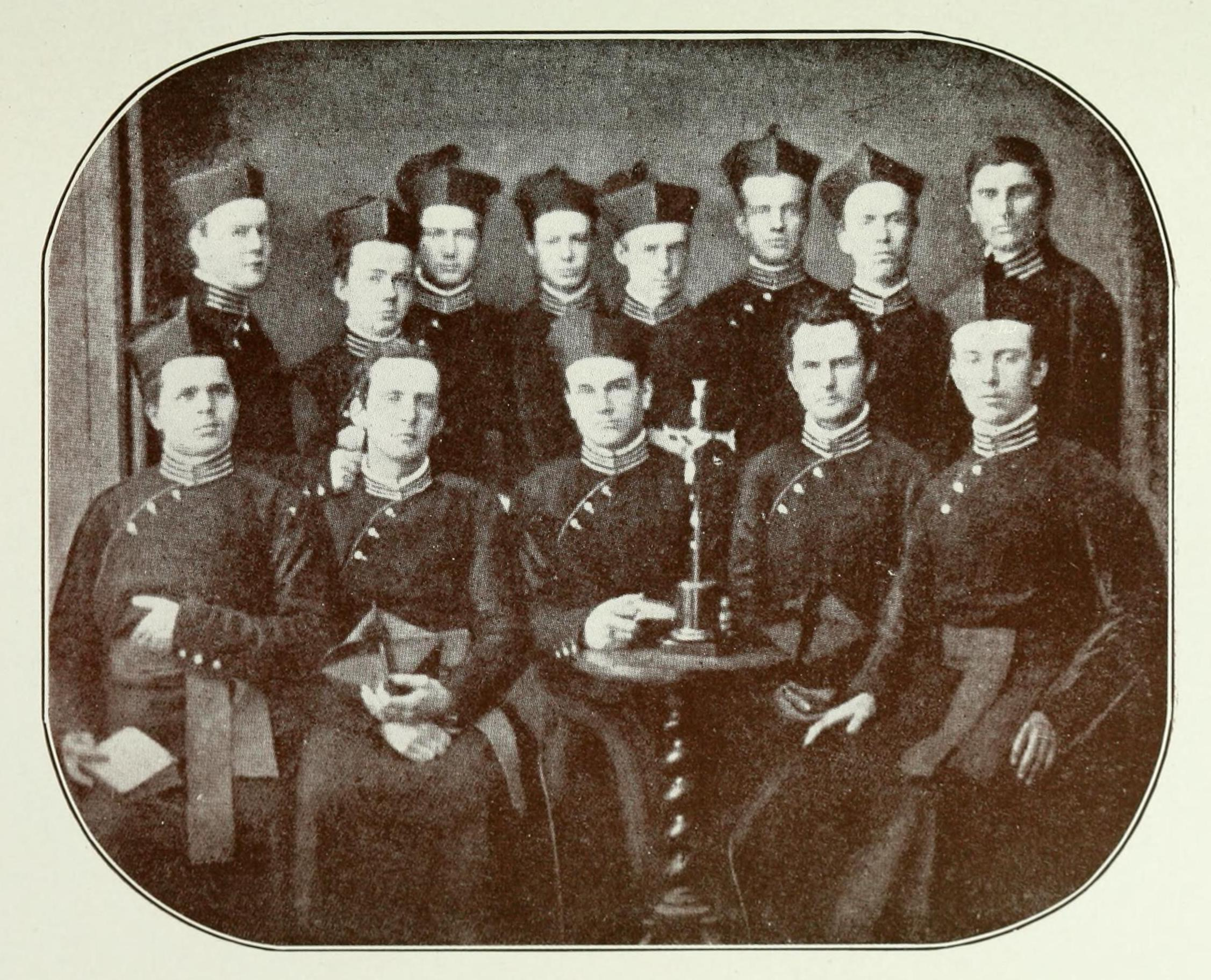
The inaugural class of the Pontifical North American College, Rome (1859). Riordan is second from left, front row.

Riordan received his early education at the University of Saint Mary of the Lake in Chicago, which functioned as a parochial school and seminary. In 1856, he enrolled at the University of Notre Dame in South Bend, Indiana, where he remained for two years. While at Notre Dame, Riordan decided to become a priest.

In 1858, the Archdiocese of Chicago sent Riordan to Rome to study at the Pontificio Collegio Urbano de Propaganda Fide. In December 1859, the Pontifical North American College opened in Rome. The bishops in the United States established the college to serve as a residence for American seminarians who were studying at the pontifical universities in that city. Riordan was one of the first twelve students to enter the college. That group included the future prelates Michael Corrigan and Robert Seton, along with the author Reuben Parsons. Edward McGlynn, later a social reformer, served as their prefect.

In August 1860, after contracting malaria, Riordan was forced to withdraw from the college. The archdiocese then sent him to Paris to recover and continue his studies at the colonial seminary, operated by the Holy Ghost Fathers. After finishing his studies of philosophy in Paris in 1861, Riordan enrolled at the American College of Louvain in Belgium to complete his theological studies. His brother Dennis later studied at Louvain and become a priest in 1869.

== Priesthood ==
While in Belgium, Riordan was ordained a priest for the Archdiocese of Chicago on June 10, 1865, by Cardinal Engelbert Sterckx. He received a licentiate in theology from Louvain in 1866. On his return to Chicago the same year, he was appointed to the faculty of the seminary department at the University of St. Mary of the Lake, first as professor of canon law and Church history before filling the chair of dogmatic theology. In 1867, he baptized his newborn cousin, Finley Peter Dunne, who would become a well-known humorist and journalist; Dunne later remarked, "[Riordan] is a creditable member of the family. We need a few archbishops to keep up the average now that the Bill has come in."

When the university was closed in 1868, Riordan was assigned to pastoral work, serving at St. Patrick's Parish in Woodstock and later at St. Mary's Church in Joliet. Meanwhile, the mental health of Chicago's Bishop James Duggan had begun to deteriorate and Rev. Dennis Dunne, Riordan's uncle, informed Rome of Duggan's instability. In retaliation, the bishop suspended Dunne from his duties as the diocese's vicar general and pastor of St. Patrick's Church. Following Dunne's death in December 1868, Duggan's refusal to attend the funeral drew sharp criticism from Catholics across the city and he appointed Riordan as pastor of St. Patrick's "in order to make some reparation." However, only four days later, the bishop rescinded Riordan's appointment after receiving reports that the priest "had spoken badly of him."

Duggan was placed in a mental institution in 1869 and Bishop Thomas Foley was given charge of diocesan affairs. Riordan's brother Dennis would serve as Foley's secretary and chancellor of the diocese (1873–1881). In June 1871, Foley named Patrick as pastor of St. James Church in Chicago. Four months into his tenure, the Great Chicago Fire devastated the city but missed St. James. Bishop Foley sent Riordan and another Chicago priest, Rev. John McMullen, to travel across the United States and Canada to collect funds for the city's restoration. This would unwittingly prepare Riordan for dealing with another disaster 35 years later in San Francisco.

As pastor of St. James, Riordan erected a new church building on Wabash Avenue to accommodate his growing congregation, laying the cornerstone in 1876 and dedicating the building in 1880. His cousin, Rev. Patrick W. Dunne, later served as pastor of St. James (1911–1927) after beginning his priestly ministry at St. Mary's Church in Joliet, where Riordan had also served. Riordan's construction of the new church caught the attention of several bishops, and in 1882 his name was included on a list of three candidates for Bishop of Charleston, South Carolina, being the preferred choice of Archbishop James Gibbons of Baltimore. Although the Charleston appointment ultimately went to Henry P. Northrop, Riordan would receive his own appointment as a bishop the following year.

== Coadjutor Archbishop and Archbishop of San Francisco ==
=== Coadjutor Archbishop ===
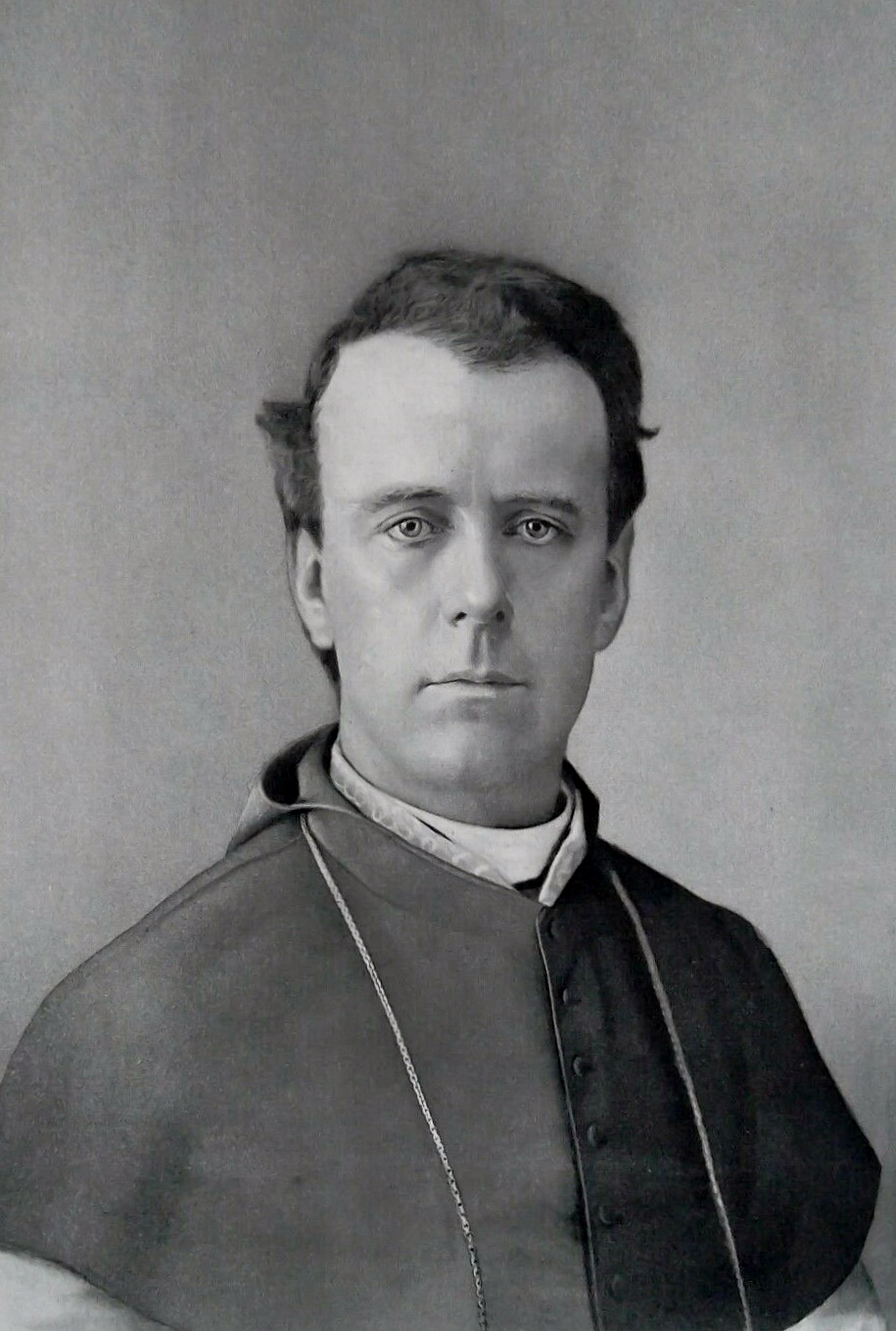
Archbishop Riordan (1889)

On July 17, 1883, Pope Leo XIII appointed Riordan to be coadjutor archbishop with the right of succession to Joseph Sadoc Alemany, the Archbishop of San Francisco, California. He was also given the honorary title of titular archbishop of Cabasa. He received his episcopal consecration on September 16, 1883, from Archbishop Patrick Feehan, with Bishops William George McCloskey and Silas Chatard serving as co-consecrators, at St. James in Chicago.

Riordan arrived in San Francisco in November 1883 and began to relieve the elderly Archbishop Alemany of his administrative duties. The following year, he and Alemany both attended the third Plenary Council of Baltimore from November 9 to December 7, 1884. During the council, Riordan brought his brother Dennis to serve as his theological consultant and chaired the committee overseeing the Bureau of Catholic Indian Missions. Shortly after the conclusion of the council, Alemany resigned as archbishop of San Francisco on December 21, 1884. Riordan automatically succeeded him as the second archbishop of San Francisco.

=== Archbishop ===
In 1884, Riordan's first full year in San Francisco, the archdiocese contained 175 priests, 128 churches, and 25 chapels and stations to serve a Catholic population of 200,000. Following his death in December 1914, there were 367 priests, 182 churches, 94 chapels and stations, and 94 parochial schools for 280,000 Catholics. Many of the new parishes under his administration were established for immigrant communities.

Within the American Catholic hierarchy, Riordan was considered a liberal. Biographer James P. Gaffey noted that Riordan's "closest friends were numbered among the so-called progressives or 'Americanizers,' such as Gibbons, Ireland, Keane, and Spalding." In 1890, the conservative Archbishop Michael Corrigan, Riordan's classmate in Rome, included Riordan's name on a list of liberal bishops. In writing to Cardinal Camillo Mazzella in Rome, Corrigan said: "In the ultra-Americanism of these prelates, I foresee dangers and sound the alarm." Even after the Vatican excommunicated the Irish theologian Reverend George Tyrrell in 1907 for his Modernist beliefs, Riordan wrote of Tyrrell: "There is a place for him and plenty of work for him to do in this great Church of Christ."

In American politics, Riordan was a conservative. During the 1912 US presidential election, he strongly supported the Republican candidate, President William Howard Taft. Riordan viewed former President Theodore Roosevelt, the candidate of the Bull Moose Party, as "...a disturber of the peace"; and he described the Democratic candidate, New Jersey Governor Woodrow Wilson, as a "theorist".

==== New cathedral and seminary ====
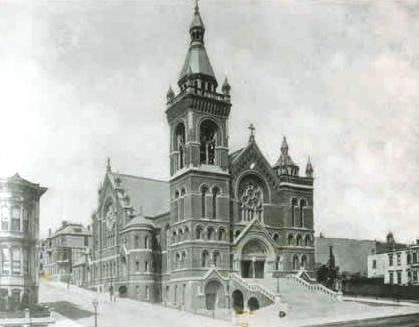
Cathedral of Saint Mary of the Assumption, San Francisco, California

Two of the largest projects during Riordan's tenure were the erection of a new cathedral and seminary for the Archdiocese. Old St. Mary's Cathedral on California Street had been used since 1854, but in May 1883 Archbishop Alemany purchased land on Van Ness Avenue for a larger cathedral to serve the city's growing Catholic population. The construction fell to Riordan, who laid the cornerstone in May 1887 and dedicated the new Cathedral of St. Mary of the Assumption in January 1891. This cathedral would serve the Archdiocese for the next 50 years, until it was destroyed by a fire in 1962.

A seminary had been established under Alemany near Mission San José (now Fremont) in 1883, but the seminary never had more than five students and collapsed within two years after the Marist professors left their posts. Riordan received a plot of land in Menlo Park from the sister of the archdiocese's lawyer, and opened St. Patrick's Seminary as a minor seminary in September 1898. Staffed by the Sulpician Fathers, the school became a major seminary with the additions of a philosophy department in 1902 and a theology department in 1904.

==== APA and Father Yorke ====
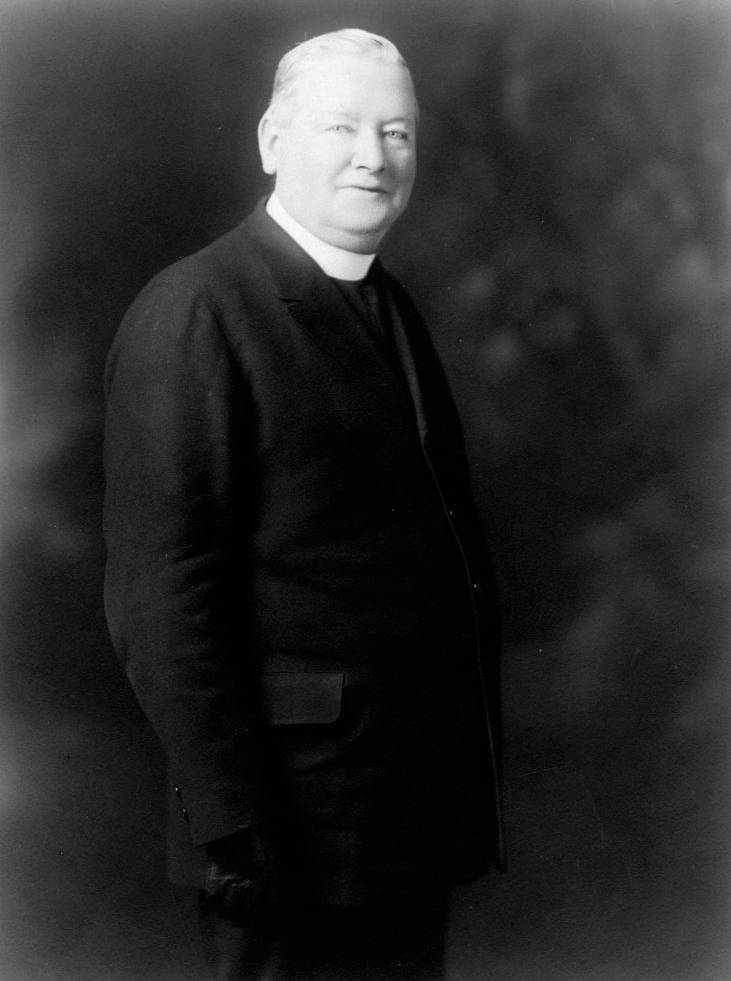
Reverend Peter Yorke (1920s)

In 1894, Riordan protested against the use in San Francisco's public schools of Outlines of Mediæval and Modern History, a history textbook by the historian Philip van Ness Myers, Riordan claimed that the textbook was anti-Catholic and called it "utterly unfit for use in a school patronized by children of various creeds." In April 1894 the San Francisco Board of Education ruled that its schools could still use the textbook. However, teachers could omit any passages that might "appear in any way to favor or to reflect on the particular doctrines or tenets of any religious sect." Some Protestant leaders in San Francisco denounced the school board decision. The Congregationalist minister Charles Oliver Brown described the decision as "a complete surrender to Rome."

The textbook controversy and the growing presence of the anti-Catholic American Protective Association in San Francisco led Riordan to appoint his chancellor, Reverend Peter Yorke, as editor of the archdiocesan newspaper The Monitor to respond to Protestant attacks. The archdiocese also established a local chapter of the Catholic Truth Society in 1897.

While Yorke proved popular among local Catholics, Riordan soon lost patience with him. A labor activist and a supporter of Irish republicanism, Yorke was a strident critic of local elected officials, including San Francisco Mayor James D. Phelan and U.S. Representative James G. Maguire. Riordan removed Yorke from The Monitor in October 1898. Riordan initially said that "Father Yorke is alone responsible for his utterances." Riordan later elaborated:

"[T]he right must be accorded to [Yorke] as to every other citizen to make public his views on the rostrum or in the newspapers of the country...The Catholic Church does not dictate to its priests or its people the policy which they should adopt in political matters."

==== Pious Fund ====
Riordan played a significant role in the first case that came before the Permanent Court of Arbitration at The Hague, which centered on the Pious Fund of the Californias. Established in 1697, the fund was an endowment paid annually by the Mexican government to sponsor missions in California. Mexico had stopped making payments to the fund in 1848 after it ceded California to the United States in the Treaty of Guadalupe Hidalgo.

Riordan and the other bishops in California contested Mexico's action with American-Mexican Claims Commission. In 1875, the commission ruled in favor of the bishops of California, requiring Mexico to pay them $904,000. However, this decision only the accrued interest on the missed payments from 1848 to 1869. Mexico paid the $904,000 in 1890.

In 1890, Riordan asked U.S. Senator William Morris Stewart of Nevada to seek diplomatic intervention by the U.S. government to obtain payment for the fund's interest since 1869. The State Department filed a claim for the unpaid interest in 1891, but there was no progress on the case for the next eight years. In 1899, Secretary of State John Hay directed Powell Clayton, the American ambassador to Mexico, to reopen negotiations on the interest payments. Mexico. In May 1902, the two governments signed a protocol that submitted the dispute to the newly established Permanent Court of Arbitration

Riordan selected the British judge Edward Fry and the Russian jurist Friedrich Martens to serve as the arbitrators for the United States, with Stewart acting its counsel. The case opened on September 15, 1902, and concluded on October 14, when the court announced its unanimous verdict in favor of the United States. The court ordered Mexico to pay the bishops $1.4 million as well as a perpetual annuity of $43,000. The U.S. government forwarded the award to Riordan and the bishops of California, withholding 35% of the proceeds to cover its legal expenses. Riordan was praised by Leo XIII for his success; there were rumors that Leo would name him as a cardinal.

==== 1906 San Francisco earthquake ====
Riordan was in Omaha, Nebraska, on his way to an event in Baltimore, when a major earthquake struck San Francisco on April 18, 1906. Among the Catholic Church's losses were more than a dozen churches and a number of other institutions, the damages totaling between $2 million and $6 million. As he left for San Francisco on April 21, Riordan also telegraphed an appeal to every bishop in the country: "The work of fifty years is blotted out. Help us to begin again."

Upon his arrival back in the city, Riordan celebrated open-air Masses for his displaced parishioners, who were living amidst the ruins in temporary shelters, and assured them, "We shall rebuild." On April 27, he addressed a committee at San Francisco's temporary city hall and quoted Paul the Apostle (Acts 21:39):

I am "a citizen of no mean city," although it is in ashes. Almighty God has fixed this as the location of a great city. The past is gone, and there is no use lamenting or moaning over it. Let us look to the future and without regard to creed or place of birth, work together in harmony for the upbuilding of a greater San Francisco.

Riordan temporarily lived in San Mateo while providing his official residence to the Presentation Sisters, who had lost their convent on Powell Street. Every church that had been destroyed had a temporary structure within two years and was rebuilt within another eight years.

== Later life and death ==
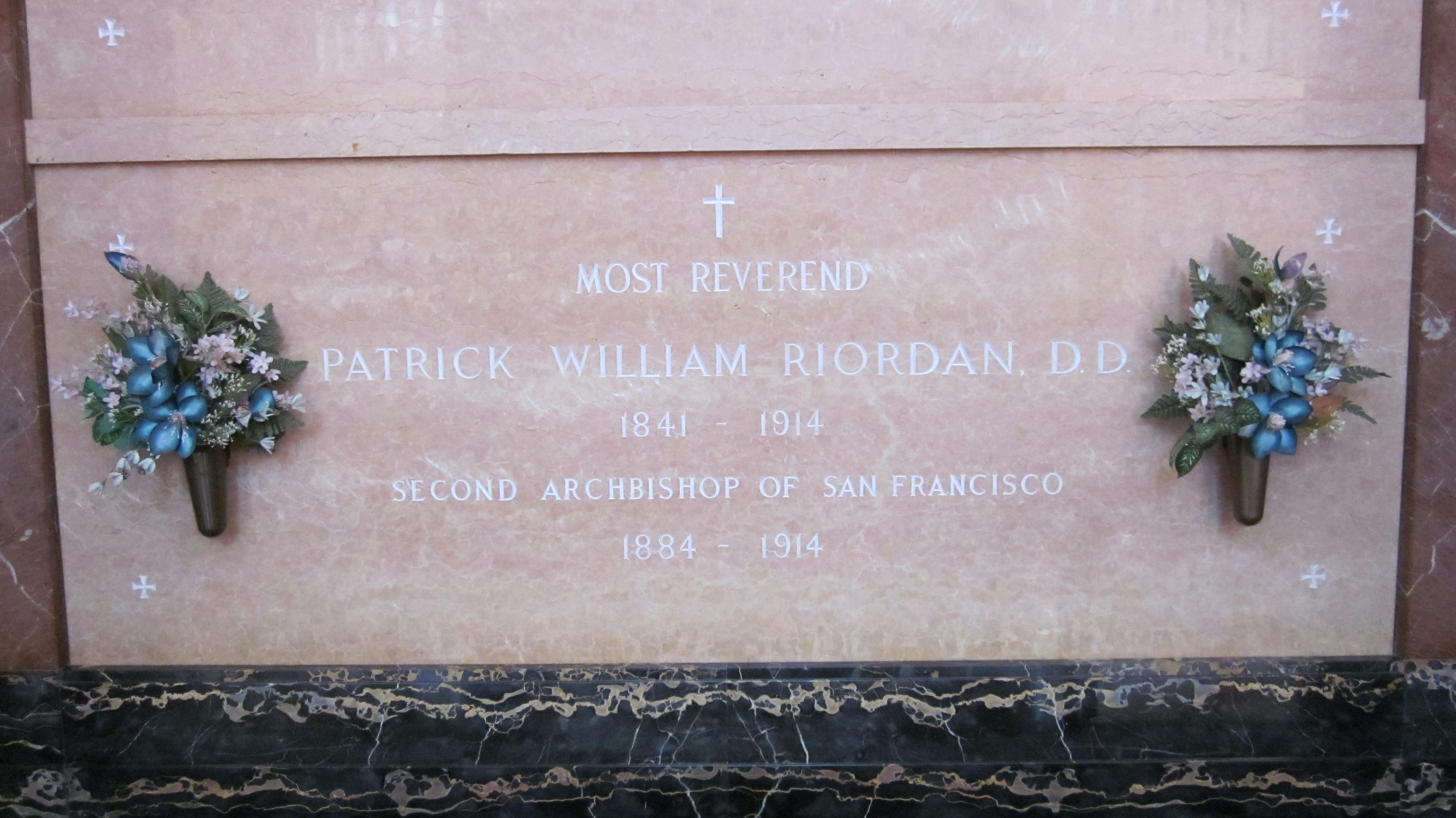
Riordan's vault at Holy Cross Cemetery.

In 1902, nearly 20 years after he came to San Francisco as a coadjutor archbishop, Riordan received Bishop George Thomas Montgomery as his own coadjutor. However, Montgomery died a few years later in 1907. To replace Montgomery, Riordan's preferred candidate was Edward Joseph Hanna, a theology professor at Saint Bernard's Seminary in Rochester, New York. But Hanna's candidacy was derailed after his fellow professor, Andrew Breen, wrote a letter to Cardinal Girolamo Maria Gotti challenging Hanna's orthodoxy and accusing him of Modernism. Riordan instead received Denis J. O'Connell, then rector of the Catholic University of America, as an auxiliary bishop in 1908 but he was later transferred to the Diocese of Richmond in 1912. Riordan again submitted Hanna's name as coadjutor and finally succeeded in October 1912.

In December 1914, Riordan contracted a severe cold which soon developed into pneumonia. He died five days later at 1000 Fulton Street, the Archbishop's Mansion, his residence in San Francisco, aged 73. He is buried in the Archbishops' Crypt at Holy Cross Cemetery, Colma. Archbishop Riordan High School in San Francisco, California, is named for him.

== Episcopal succession ==
Catholic Church titles
Preceded by Joseph Sadoc Alemany, O.P.	Archbishop of San Francisco; 1884–1914	Succeeded by Edward Joseph Hanna

== Sources ==
- Gaffey, James P. (1976). Citizen of No Mean City: Archbishop Patrick W. Riordan of San Francisco (1841-1914). Wilmington, Delaware: Consortium Books. ISBN 0-8434-0628-3.
