= Particularism =

Particularism may refer to:

- Epistemological particularism, one of the answers to the problem of the criterion in epistemology
- Historical particularism, an approach in anthropology
- Moral particularism, the view that there are no universal moral principles
- Multicultural particularism, the belief that a common culture for all people is either undesirable or impossible
- Political particularism, the politics of group identity that trumps universal rights
- Religious particularism, name given to the phenomenon of Americanism in the apostolic letter Testem benevolentiae nostrae

== See also ==
- Particular – Concept in metaphysics
