= Faith of Our Fathers =

Faith of Our Fathers may refer to:

- "Faith of Our Fathers" (hymn), an 1849 hymn by Frederick William Faber
- The Faith of Our Fathers, an 1876 book by James Gibbons
- Faith of Our Fathers (short story), a 1967 science-fiction story by Philip K. Dick
- Faith of Our Fathers (album), a 1996 compilation album by Irish artists
- Faith of Our Fathers (film), a 2015 film by Carey Scott
