= Testem benevolentiae =

Apostolic letter written by Pope Leo XIII

Testem benevolentiae Latin for 'Witness to good will' Apostolic letter of Pope Leo XIII
- Signature date: 22 January 1899
- Subject: Americanism
- Text: In Latin; In English
- ASS: 31: 470-479

Testem benevolentiae is an apostolic letter written by Pope Leo XIII to Cardinal James Gibbons, Archbishop of Baltimore, dated January 22, 1899. In it, the pope addressed a heresy that he called Americanism and expressed his concern that the Catholic Church in the United States should guard against American values of liberalism and pluralism undermining the doctrine of the Church.

== Background ==
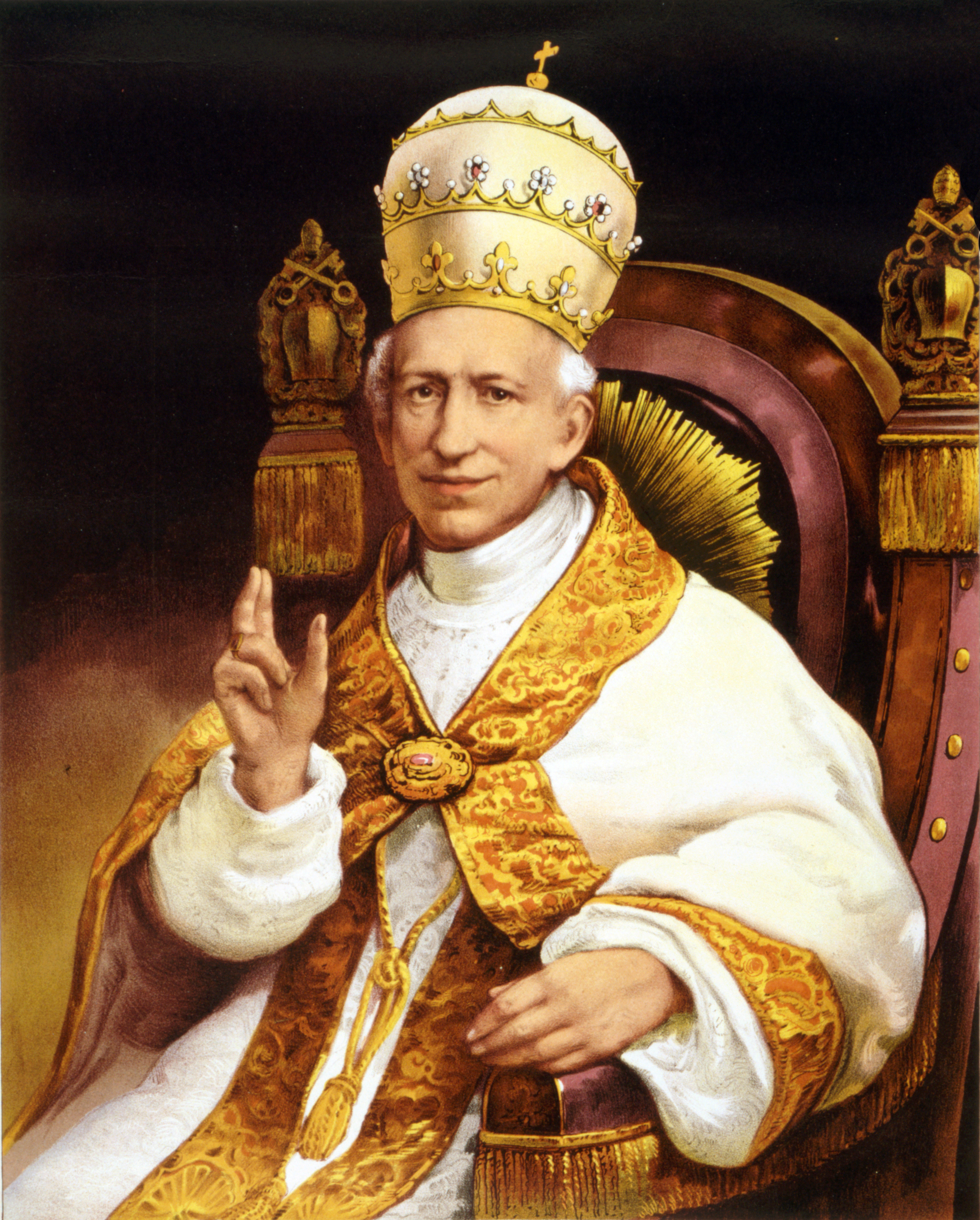
Pope Leo XIII

Testem benevolentiae is Latin for "Witness to Good Will." Pope Leo XIII was concerned about the culture of Catholics in the United States in response to the preface of the French translation of the biography of the American priest Isaac Thomas Hecker. Hecker's biography reached France 11 years after Hecker had died in good standing with the Church, and its French translation included a liberal preface by Abbé Félix Klein. Leo proposed to review certain opinions expressed by the translator in the book about Hecker. In particular, Klein implied that Hecker thought that the Catholic Church should adapt to the new advanced civilization, relax its disciplines regarding the rule of life and the deposit of faith, and pass over or minimize certain points of doctrine or give to them a new meaning that the Church had never held.

According to his biographers Fr. Vincent A. Yzermans and Franz Xaver Wetzel, Archbishop John Joseph Frederick Otto Zardetti, whose repeated clashes over theology, while Bishop of St. Cloud, with Archbishop John Ireland and his supporters within the American hierarchy are well-documented, played a major role, as an official of the Roman Curia, in Testem Benevolentiae, which was signed by the Pope on 22 January, 1899. As a reward, Zardetti was promoted to assistant to the papal throne on 14 February 1899. In commenting on Zardetti's role in the letter, Fr. Yzermans has commented, "In this arena, he might well have seen his greatest impact on American Catholicism in the first half of the twentieth century in the United States."

== Content ==
=== Rejection of American particularism ===
Testem benevolentiae involved American particularism and view of individual liberty. On particularism, it was believed that a movement of American Catholics felt they were a special case and needed greater latitude to assimilate to a majority-Protestant nation. The letter rejected the idea of some who conceive and would have the Church in America to be different from what it is in the rest of the world.

The letter actually had more to do with liberal currents among Catholics in France than those in the United States. French conservatives were appalled at Abbé Félix Klein's remarks in a book about an American priest, Isaac Thomas Hecker, and claimed that a number of the American Catholic clergy shared those views.

Leo expresses concern that Americans would value their freedom and individualism so much that they would reject the idea of monasteries and the priesthood: "Did not your country, the United States, derive the beginnings both of faith and of culture from the children of these religious families?"

It was not uncommon for American bishops, finding themselves having to provide education and health care to large numbers of immigrants, to solicit congregations pointedly that were involved in those activities. Leo cautioned against valuing an active apostolate more than a contemplative one: "Nor should any difference of praise be made between those who follow the active state of life and those others who charmed with solitude, give themselves to prayer and bodily mortification."

=== Negative view of freedom of press ===
In November 1892, at a meeting of the archbishops held in New York City, Bishop Francesco Satolli, who would soon be the first apostolic delegate to the United States, presented 14 propositions regarding the solution of certain school problems that had been for some time under discussion. The draft propositions were "inopportunely" published with incorrect interpretations and malign insinuations in some papers, which caused a good deal of "acrid" discussion.

The apostolic letter clearly rejects full freedom of the press:

"These dangers, viz., the confounding of license with liberty, the passion for discussing and pouring contempt upon any possible subject, the assumed right to hold whatever opinions one pleases upon any subject and to set them forth in print to the world, have so wrapped minds in darkness that there is now a greater need of the Church's teaching office than ever before, lest people become unmindful both of conscience and of duty."

== Legacy and influence ==
The disturbance caused by the condemnation was slight since almost the entire laity and a considerable part of the clergy were unaware of the affair. However, the letter ended up strengthening the position of the conservatives in France.

== See also ==
- Syllabus of Errors
