= Arthur Preuss =

German-American journalist, editor and writer

Arthur Preuss (1871–1934) was a German-American journalist, editor and writer. He is noted for editing the Fortnightly Review and for opposing Freemasonry, Marxism, and eugenics. He was a conservative intellectual whose father, Eduard Friedrich Reinhold Preuss, had also edited a Catholic newspaper.

Preuss was a layman in St Louis. His Fortnightly Review was a major conservative voice in English and read closely by church leaders and intellectuals from 1894 to 1934. He also edited Amerika, a Catholic newspaper in St. Louis, serving also as managing editor. Amerika was published without interruption in St. Louis, in German, from 1872 until 1921; at the time of closing, it had a circulation of 25,000 copies. Preuss had succeeded his father Edward as editor.

Intensely loyal to the Vatican, Preuss upheld the German Catholic community, denounced the heresy of Americanism, promoted the Catholic University of America, and anguished over anti-German sentiment during World War I. He provided lengthy commentary regarding the National Catholic Welfare Conference, the anti-Catholic factor in the presidential campaign of 1928, the hardships of the Great Depression, and the liberalism of the New Deal.

== Works ==
- A Dictionary of Secret and Other Societies, St. Louis, Mo. / London: B. Herder Book Co., 1924.
- Freemasonry and the Human Soul, Kessinger Publishing.
- Masonic Morality and Benevolence, Kessinger Publishing.
- 'The Fundamental Fallacy of Socialism an Exposition of the Question of Landownership'.
