= Eugen Zardetti =

Swiss painter and early automobile owner

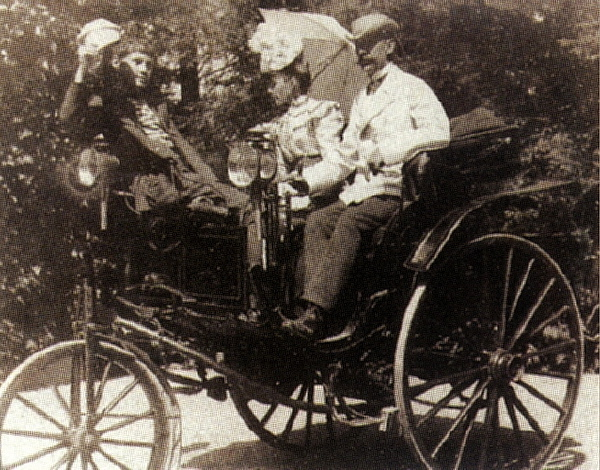
Eugen Zardetti in his Benz Patent-Motorwagen Model 3, c.1895

Eugen Zardetti (27 November 1849, Rorschach - 21 February 1926, Lucerne) was a Swiss portrait and marine painter. He was also an early automobile owner.

== Biography ==
His father, Eugen, and mother Annette (née Von Bayer) were from an upper-class family that dealt in various colonial goods. He graduated from the Stella Matutina in Vorarlberg. Having displayed an early aptitude for art, he studied at the University of Innsbruck for a time, then switched to the Polytechnikum in Zürich where he studied with the architect Gottfried Semper. After stays in Geneva and Lucerne, he attended the Academy of Fine Arts, Karlsruhe. His artistic education was completed with study trips to Paris, Italy, and along the east coast of Africa.

After 1885, he was able to purchase a small mansion, the "Villa Mirador", in Bregenz (now a residence for a local gymnasium) and decided to specialize in marine painting. His best known work is, perhaps, a monumental panorama of the Battle of Lepanto. He also did maritime-themed paintings at the Gemäldegalerie and the Hoftheater in Dresden, the Rathaus in Winterthur and structures around the Ringstraße in Vienna.

From 1914, after the beginning of World War I, he lived in Lucerne.

He was also interested in technology and was the first owner in Austria of a three-wheeled Benz Patent-Motorwagen, the first automobile to be produced industrially. In 1898, he had it rebuilt as a four-wheeler. After his death, it was acquired by the Vienna Technical Museum where it still remains. Until 1896, Zardetti was the only automobile owner in Vorarlberg. When he purchased the vehicle in 1893, he began a diary related to it, which was donated, together with some of his paintings, to the Vorarlberger Landesbibliothek in 2007.

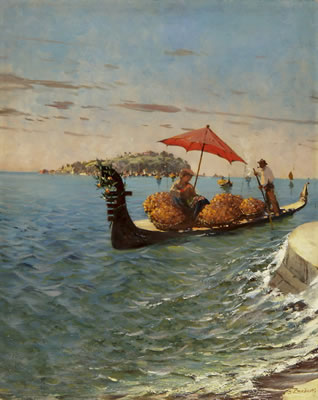
Off the Coast of Capri

His older brother, Otto Zardetti, served as the Archbishop of Bucharest. One of his nieces was the author Lilly Braumann-Honsell, who owned the first steam yacht on Lake Constance.
