= John Joseph Frederick Otto Zardetti =

Swiss prelate

His Excellency, The Right Reverend John Joseph Frederick Otto Zardetti
- Official of the Roman Curia; Titular Archbishop of Mocissus
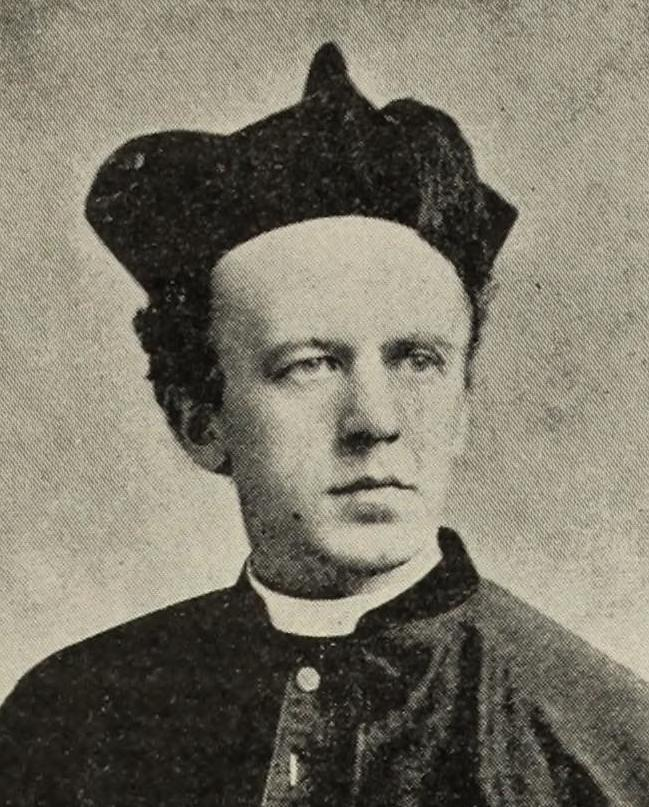
- Church: Roman Catholic
- Appointed: June 12, 1895
- Other posts: Roman Catholic Diocese of St. Cloud 1889 to 1894; Roman Catholic Archdiocese of Bucharest 1894 to 1895

Orders
- Ordination: August 21, 1870 by Benedetto Riccabona de Reinchenfels
- Consecration: October 20, 1889 by William Hickley Gross

Personal details
- Born: January 24, 1847 Rorschach, St. Gallen, Switzerland
- Died: May 10, 1902 (aged 55) Rome, Italy
- Education: University of Innsbruck

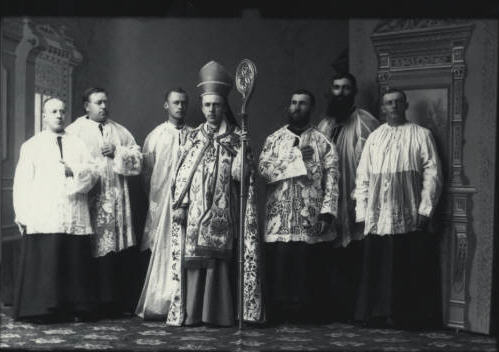
Archbishop Zardetti, 1890

John Joseph Frederick Otto Zardetti (January 24, 1847 – May 10, 1902) was a Swiss prelate of the Roman Catholic Church. He served as the first bishop of the new Diocese of Saint Cloud in Minnesota in the United States from 1889 to 1894. Zardetti then served as Archbishop of the Archdiocese of Bucharest in what is today Romania from 1894 to 1895. After resigning as archbishop, Zardetti briefly, but influentially served in the Roman Curia with the title of titular archbishop of Mocissus.

According to his biographer Reverend Vincent A. Yzermans, Zardetti played a major role in successfully pushing for Pope Leo XIII's 1899 Apostolic letter Testem Benevolentiae, which condemned the heresy of Americanism. In commenting on Zardetti's role in the letter, Yzermans has commented, "In this arena he might well have had seen his greatest impact on American Catholicism in the first half of the twentieth century in the United States."

== Biography ==
=== Early life ===
Otto Zardetti was born on January 24, 1847, in Rorschach, Canton of St. Gallen, Switzerland, to Eugen and Annette Anna (née von Bayer) Zardetti, an upper-middle-class family who dealt in canvas and colonial goods. His paternal ancestors, members of the minor Italian nobility, had moved to Switzerland from Bagno, in the Kingdom of Piedmont, at the end of the 18th century. Otto's father Eugen Zardetti then married Annette von Bayer, a member of an aristocratic family. Otto's brother was Eugen Zardetti, the artist, photographer, and automobile pioneer. Otto Zardetti attended the local primary and secondary school in Rorschach, then enrolled in the Stella Matutina School, operated by the Society of Jesus in Feldkirch in the Austrian Empire.

Having decided to become a priest, Zardetti returned to Switzerland, where he entered the diocesan minor seminary near St. Gallen, Switzerland. Zardetti returned to the Austrian Empire to study theology and philosophy at the University of Innsbruck in Innsbruck.

Due to his talent for languages, Zardetti was invited by Bishop Karl Johann Greith to attend the First Vatican Council in Rome from November 1869 to spring 1870. While in Rome, Zardetti met the future Bishop Martin Marty, another Swiss priest. Returning to Innsbruck, Zardetti received a Doctor of Theology degree from the University of Innsbruck in 1870.

=== Priesthood ===
Zardetti was ordained to the priesthood by Bishop Benedetto Riccabona de Reinchenfels in 1870 in St. Gallen. Zardetti's fluency in French, English and Italian as well as German brought him a post as professor in rhetoric in St. Georgen (1871–1874). An 1874 visit to England resulted in Zardetti developing a close friendship with Cardinal Henry Edward Manning, who would remain a major influence on Zardetti.

In 1874, Zardetti was named library director for the Abbey of Saint Gall in St. Gallen. He was appointed canon (Domkustos) in 1876 for the Diocese of St. Gallen. In 1879, Zardetti embarked on a four-month trip to the United States. Returning to Switzerland, he soon received an offer from Archbishop Michael Heiss of the Archdiocese of Milwaukee to teach dogmatics at the Metropolitan Seminary of Wisconsin. After accepting the offer, Zardetti arrived in Wisconsin in late 1881. In 1887, Marty appointed Zardetti as general vicar for the Vicariate Apostolic of Dakota.

=== Bishop of Saint Cloud ===
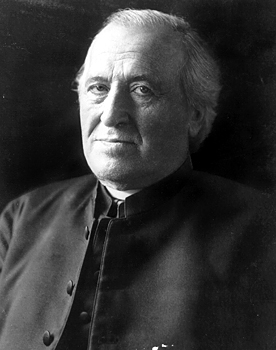
Archbishop Ireland

Pope Leo XIII appointed Zardetti on October 3, 1889, as the first bishop of the new Diocese of St. Cloud. Traveling in Europe at that time, he was consecrated in Einsiedlen, Switzerland, on October 20, 1889, by Archbishop William Gross. After traveling to St. Cloud, Minnesota, Zardetti immediately started construction of the diocesan cathedral. He worked to enlarge the parochial school system and created a newspaper for the diocese. Zardetti soon became known throughout the United States for his oratorical skills.

==== Language issues ====
During his term as bishop of St. Cloud, Zardetti clashed repeatedly with Archbishop John Ireland of St. Paul and his supporters in the American Catholic hierarchy. One reasons for these clashes was Zardetti's hostility to Ireland's Modernist theology. Another reason was Ireland's belief in banning the use of all languages other than English from Catholic parishes and schools. Zardetti believed that teaching and preaching in German and other minority languages was important in preserving the heritage of immigrant populations. One subsequent historian dubbed Zardetti as, "Ireland's most aggravating suffragan."

Although they are rooted in Pope Gregory XI's 1373 "règle d'idiom", a commandment for the Catholic clergy to communicate with their flocks in the local vernacular, instead of allowing the Church to become a tool of coercive language death, Zardetti's reasons for opposing the English-only movement were expressed in his sermon of September 21, 1891 inside St. Joseph's Cathedral during the Fifth German-American Congress in Buffalo, New York. Zardetti's speech was entitled (German: Die Pflichten und Rechte des Adoptivbürgers in Amerika) "America and her Citizens by Adoption", but has since been dubbed, "The Sermon on the Mother and the Bride". In his speech, Zardetti denounced Nativism, which he compared to building a Great Wall of China around the U.S. border and denying entrance to anyone not wearing a queue. He called such policies a national ruin and argued that, as German-Americans, "We all have left our mother and chosen America as our bride." He denounced the concept of linguistic imperialism imposed by the government as "tyranny", as leaving language shifts to natural processes rooted in individual choices was far preferable. Zardetti added,

"Language is so intimately connected with man that even when favored by circumstances and prompted by zeal, he learns a new language, he must be permitted to express his needs and heart's desires in the mother tongue. Otherwise nature itself remonstrates and, as a consequence thereof, religious apostasy will follow. Antagonisms and racial differences cannot be wiped out by coercion. An attempt at suppressing them by force only adds bitterness and renders them more prominent. Warfare and friction originate from it."

In closing, Zardetti preached,

"Love Germany; she is your mother. In sorrow has she brought you forth. Her lineage may be placed side by side with any that of any nation. You are the equal of any. As a united nation of brothers, love America. I need not say to the groom love your spouse. That love which prompted you to leave father and mother and to cross the ocean and which now holds you here with a thousand ties, needs no encouragement from me. Where could you find another bride so young, so rich, so charming as America? Above her head the stars circle. Her garment is embroidered by the busy hands of nations. In her bosom she bears the riches of a New World, gold in her minerals, gold in her granaries, gold in her handiwork."

James Conway, an Ireland supporter, attacked Zardetti's speech in the September 28, 1891, issue of the Northwestern Chronicle, accusing him of advocating neglect for the Catholic Church. Conway continued,

"No wonder she should grow somewhat jealous, and complain of the cold treatment accorded her. Bishop Zardetti's appreciation of Scripture is too great not to have noticed how the spirit of the following text was violated: 'Wherefore a man shall leave father and mother and shall cleave to his wife.' No wonder the bride should utter complaint through the press that she was subordinated to the mother-in-law. The blushing beauty was neglected."

Zardetti replied to Conway on October 30, saying he misquoted the sermon, saying that "... he did not speak of German immigrants alone, but of all not born on American soil, which included himself and the editor of the Chronicle."

==== Catholic schools ====
Zardetti was equally firm in his defense of Catholic schools in the United States, against the concept, which he viewed as rooted in The Enlightenment, that children are the sole property of the State, which alone has the right to educate or form children's minds through compulsory attendance at public schools. At the same time that Ireland was seeking to make Catholic schools as similar to public schools as possible through the Poughkeepsie plan and similar measures, Zardetti was vocal in his belief that the United States Government could not be trusted to tolerate the independence of Catholic schools, which he argued should never accept government funding or even free textbooks. Zardetti believed that any dependence on Government aid whatsoever would eventually be used as a means of destroying the independence of both Catholic education and the Church itself from control by the State.

==== Morality issues ====
Between 1893 and 1894, Zardetti worked closely with St. Cloud Times editor Colin Francis MacDonald and the city's Protestant clergy to oppose what they viewed as the tolerant policies of Republican Mayor Daniel Webster Bruckhart towards organized prostitution and illegal gambling in St. Cloud. The newspaper made multiple allegations of crime figures paying protection money to senior figures in both the city government and the police department. Zardetti and the Protestant clergy denounced prostitution, illegal gambling and corrupt politicians in sermons on Easter Sunday 1894. On the next election day, April 1, 1894, only one city official was successfully re-elected in what Yzermans described as a, "massacre."

Suffering from chronic health problems that were aggravated by the harsh Minnesota climate and much traveling, Zardetti requested that the Vatican transfer him back in Europe.

=== Archbishop of Bucharest and member of Curia ===
Leo XIII appointed Zardetti as archbishop of Bucharest on March 6, 1894. However, his health again became a problem. In response, Leo XIII accepted Zardetti's resignation on May 25, 1895, as archbishop of Bucharest. The pope appointed him as titular archbishop of Mocissus and named him to the Roman Curia. He became a canon to the Church of Saint John Lateran in Rome and as a consultor to two districts in that city.

According to Yzermans and Franz Xaver Wetzel, Zardetti's clashes over theology and other matters with Ireland and his supporters in the American hierarchy never completely ceased. Zardetti played a major role, in his capacity as a member of the Roman Curia, in Leo XIII's apostolic letter Testem Benevolentiae, which condemned Americanism as a heresy. The encyclical was signed by Leo XIII on January 22, 1899. Zardetti was elevated by the Vatican to assistant to the papal throne on February 14, 1899. During this period, Zardetti expressed his desire to revisit St. Cloud, but his health problems prevented it.

== Death and burial ==
Otto Zardetti died at the Convent of the Sisters of the Holy Cross in Rome on May 10, 1902, at age 55. Following a requiem mass offered by Bishop Augustine Egger of St. Gall, Zardetti was buried beside the theologian Cardinal Joseph Hergenröther in the crypt of the Cistercian Territorial Abbey of Wettingen-Mehrerau, near Bregenz, Vorarlberg, in Austria-Hungary.

== Writings ==
=== In German ===
- Die Kirche von St. Gallen, ein Spiegelbild der allgemeinen Kirche, Sermon. Benziger, Einsiedeln.
- Die Restauration der Wallfahrtskirche zum heilig Kreuz bei St. Gallen, Moosberger, St. Gallen.
- Das neue Licht von Himmel in der dogmatischen Definition der unbefleckten Empfängnis Mariä, Fisser. Frankfurt.
- Ignatius von Loyola, Kanzelrede, Benziger, Einsiedeln.
- Die neue Welt Nordamerikas, betrachtet im Licht des Glaubens. Kanzelvortrag. Benziger, Einsiedeln.
- Die göttliche Vorsehung im menschlichen Leben. Abschiedspredegt. Moosberger, St. Gallen.
- Die katholische Kirche, die Stiftung des Gottmenschen. Kanzelrede. Räber, Luzern.
- Das Kreuz der Kirche oder Erschütterung und Neubelebung des Katholizismus in der Gegenwart, Festpredigt. Räber, Luzern.
- Der selige Nikolaus von der Flüe. Gedenkblatt. Moosberger, St. Gallen.
- Die Sprache Roms, Anrede. Benziger, Einsiedeln.
- 1878 Christus am Kreuze, Four Sermons on the Passion of Christ. Räber, Luzern.
- Maryland, die Wiege des Katholizismus und der Freiheit Nordamerikas. Fösser, Frankfurt am Main.
- Die makellose Jungfrau, die Patronin der Vereinigten Staaten Nordamerikas, Anrede. Benziger, New York City.
- Die kirchliche Sequenz: Komm Heilige Geist. Herder, Freiburg.
- Manule für die Herz-Jesu-Andacht, St. Cloud, Minnesota.
- Die Andacht zum heiligen Geiste, Columbia, Milwaukee.
- Die Symbol des Erzbischöflichen Palliums, published in both German and French by Benziger, Einsiedeln.
- Die wahre Idee der kirchlichen Music, Anrede. Pustet, New York City.
- 1891 Die Pflichten und Rechte des Adoptivbürgers in Amerika, Festrede. Bachem, Cologne.
- Roma felix! oder 'Wird Rom wieder päpstlichen werden?' Fösser, Frankfurt am Main.
- Zehn Bilder aus Süd-England. Benziger, Einsiedeln.
- Die Bischofsweihe. Benziger, Einsiedeln.
- Die Priesterweihe, Benziger, Einsiedeln.
- Requies s. Galli oder Geschichtliche Beleuchtung der Kathedrale des heiligen Gallus. Benziger, Einsiedeln.
- Pius der Grosse: Immortellenkränze auf den Sarkophag Papst Pius IX, Fösser, Frankfurt am Main.
- 1897 Westlich! Oder durch den fernen Westen Nord-Amerikas. Kirchheim, Mainz.

=== In English ===
- 1888 Special Devotion to the Holy Ghost: A Manual for the use of Seminarians, Priests, Religious and the Christian people
- 1891 America and Her Citizens by Adoption. Address Delivered in the Cathedral in Buffalo, New York, Catholic Publishing Company, St. Louis, Missouri

Catholic Church titles
Preceded by None	Bishop of St. Cloud; 1889–1894	Succeeded by Martin Marty
