= James Gibbons =

Catholic cardinal (1834–1921)

His Eminence James Gibbons
- Cardinal, Archbishop of Baltimore
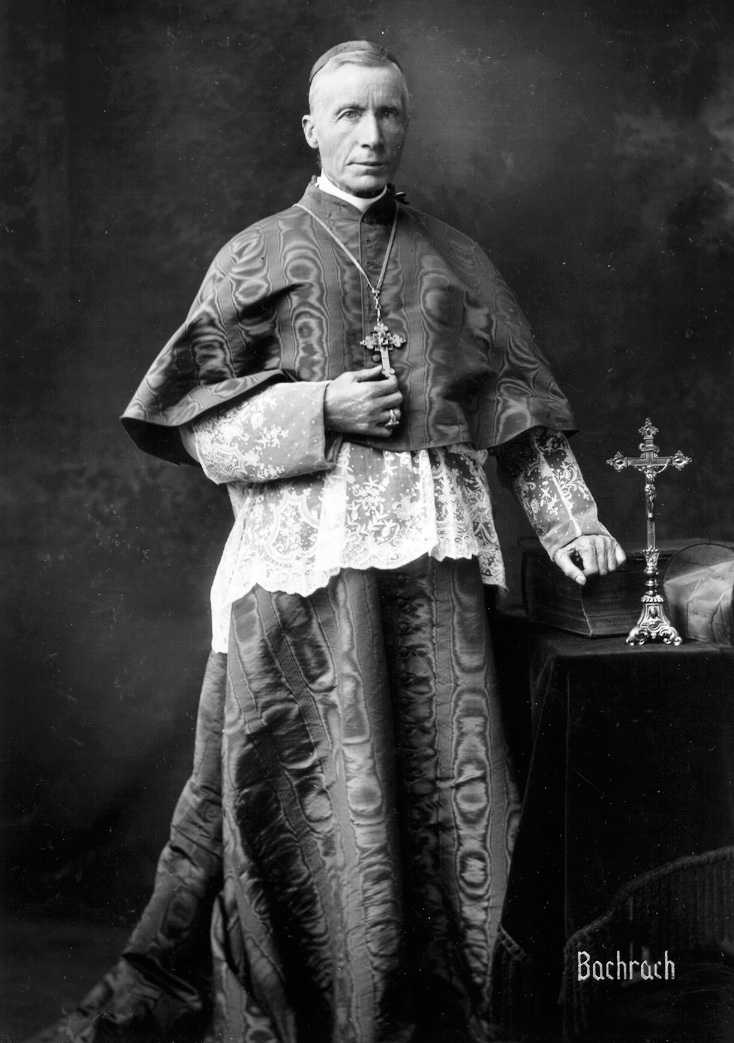
- See: Archdiocese of Baltimore
- Appointed: May 29, 1877 (coadjutor)
- Installed: October 3, 1877
- Term ended: March 24, 1921
- Predecessor: James Roosevelt Bayley
- Successor: Michael Joseph Curley
- Other post: Cardinal-Priest of Santa Maria in Trastevere
- Previous post: Bishop of Richmond (1872–77)

Orders
- Ordination: June 30, 1861 by Francis Kenrick
- Consecration: August 16, 1868 by Martin John Spalding
- Created cardinal: June 7, 1886 by Leo XIII
- Rank: Cardinal-Priest

Personal details
- Born: July 23, 1834 Baltimore, Maryland, U.S.
- Died: March 24, 1921 (aged 86) Baltimore, Maryland, U.S.
- Education: St. Charles College; St. Mary's Seminary
- Motto: Emitte spiritum tuum (Send forth your spirit)
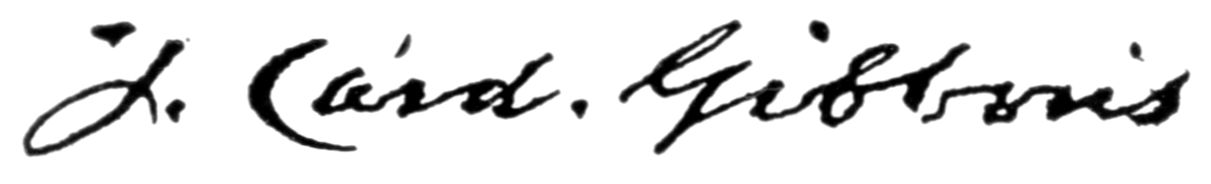
- Signature

Styles of James Gibbons
- Reference style: His Eminence; The Most Reverend Eminence
- Spoken style: Your Eminence
- Religious style: Cardinal
- Informal style: Cardinal

James Gibbons (July 23, 1834 – March 24, 1921) was an American Catholic prelate who served as Archbishop of Baltimore for more than forty years, from 1877 until his death in 1921. Created a cardinal in 1886, he was the second American cardinal, after John McCloskey.

Ordained a bishop at age 34, Gibbons previously served as Apostolic Vicar of North Carolina (1868–1872) and Bishop of Richmond (1872–1877). In 1876, he published the apologetic book The Faith of Our Fathers, which became a best-selling work. During his time as Baltimore's archbishop, Gibbons became one of the most recognizable Catholic figures in the country. He defended the rights of organized labor and advocated for Americanism as a means of assimilation.

== Early life and education ==
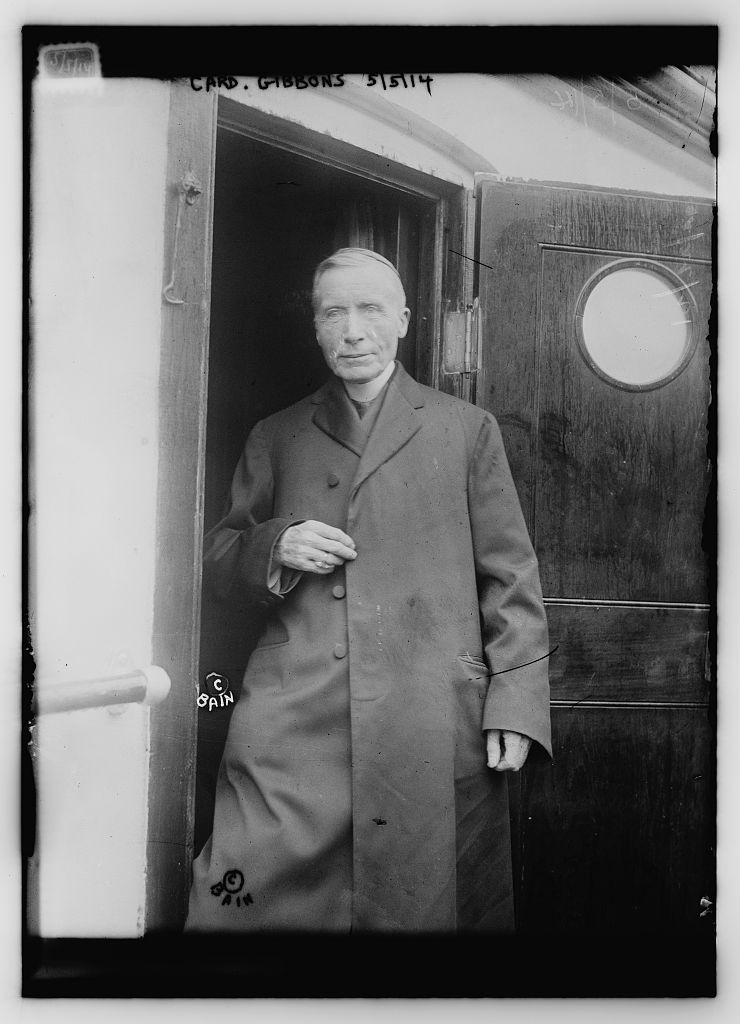
Cardinal Gibbons in May 1914

James Gibbons was born on July 23, 1834, in Baltimore, Maryland, the fourth of six children, to Thomas and Bridget (née Walsh) Gibbons. His parents were from Tourmackeady, County Mayo, in Ireland. The family left Ireland to settle in Canada, then moved to the United States.

After contracting tuberculosis in 1839, Thomas returned with the family back to Ireland, hoping the Irish climate would help him recover. He opened a grocery store in Ballinrobe, where James Gibbons worked as a child. Slight of build and a little under than average height, James Gibbons suffered from gastric problems and consequent periods of anxiety and clinical depression. Thomas Gibbons died in Ireland in 1847; in 1853, Bridget Gibbons moved the family back to the United States, settling in New Orleans, Louisiana. As a young boy he remembered seeing President Andrew Jackson riding in his carriage.

While attending a Catholic retreat in New Orleans, Gibbons heard a sermon by Reverend Clarence A. Walworth, co-founder of the Paulist Fathers. Inspired to become a priest, Gibbons in 1855 entered St. Charles College in Ellicott City, Maryland. After graduating from St. Charles in 1857, he went to St. Mary's Seminary in Baltimore. He suffered a severe attack of malaria while at St. Mary's, leaving him so debilitated that the staff doubted his ability to handle the priesthood.

== Priesthood ==
Having recovered from malaria, Gibbons was ordained a priest on June 30, 1861, for the Archdiocese of Baltimore by Archbishop Francis Kenrick at St. Mary's Seminary. After Gibbons' ordination, the archdiocese assigned him as curate at St. Patrick's Parish in the Fells Point section of Baltimore for six weeks. They then named him the first pastor of St. Brigid's Parish and as pastor of St. Lawrence Parish, both in Baltimore. During the American Civil War, Gibbons served as a chaplain for Confederate Army prisoners at Fort McHenry in Baltimore.

In 1865, Archbishop Martin Spalding appointed Gibbons as his personal secretary. Gibbons helped Spalding prepare for the Second Plenary Council of Baltimore in October 1866. At Spalding's prompting, the council fathers recommended the Vatican created an apostolic vicariate for North Carolina and appoint Gibbons head to it.

== Episcopal career ==
=== Apostolic Vicar of North Carolina ===
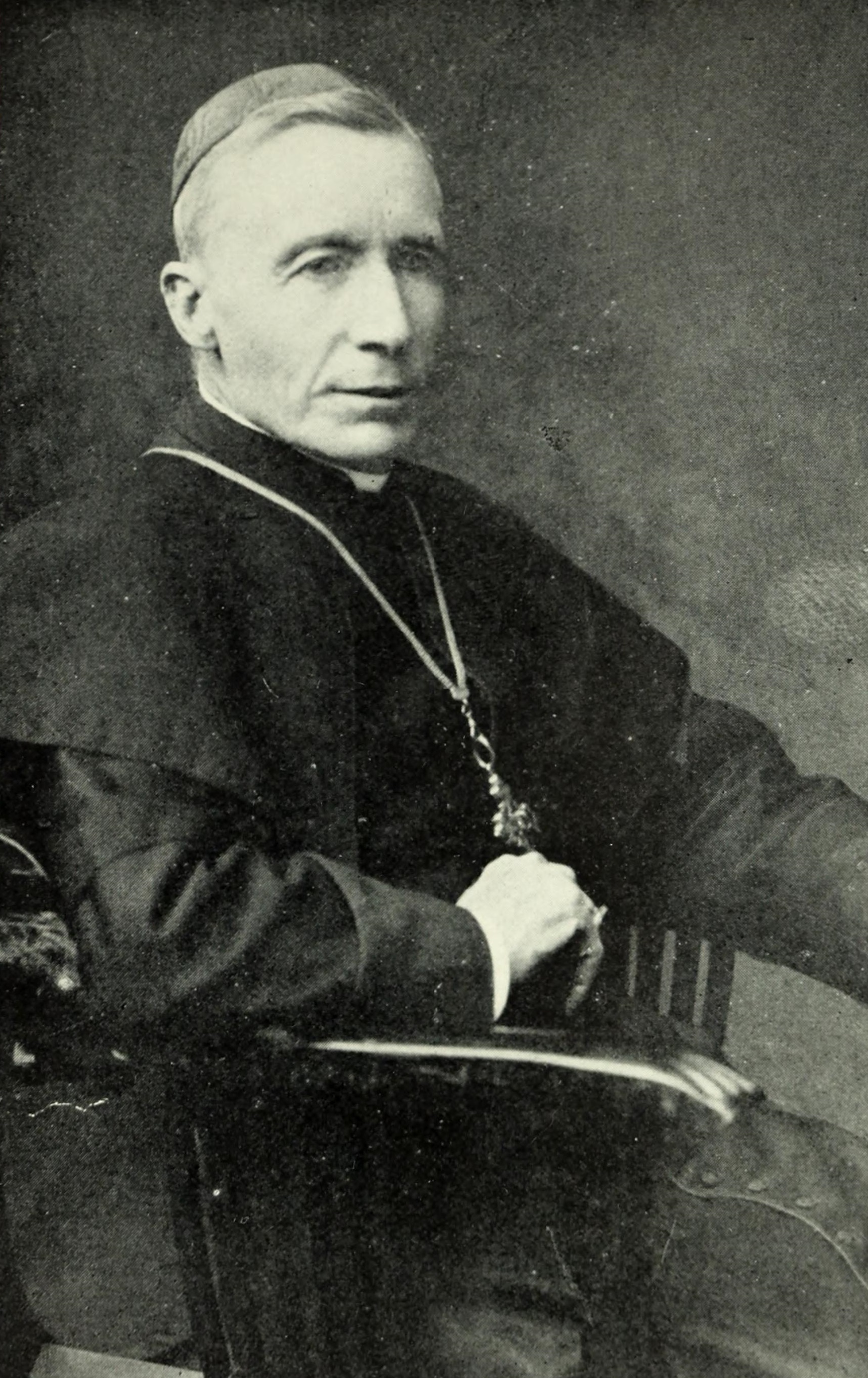
Cardinal Gibbons (pre-1915)

On March 3, 1868, Pope Pius IX appointed Gibbons as the first apostolic vicar of North Carolina and titular bishop of Adramyttium. He received his episcopal consecration on August 16, 1868, from Spalding, with Bishops Patrick Lynch and Michael Domenec serving as co-consecrators, at the Cathedral of the Assumption in Baltimore. At age 34, he was one of the youngest Catholic bishops in the world and was known as "the boy bishop."

Gibbons' vicariate contained fewer than 700 Catholics spread over the state of North Carolina. During his first four weeks in office, he traveled almost a thousand miles, visiting towns and mission stations and administering sacraments. During his road trip, Gibbons befriended many Protestants, and was invited to preach at Protestant churches. Gibbons made a number of converts to Catholicism. Gibbons became a popular American religious figure, gathering crowds for his sermons on diverse topics that could apply to Christianity as a whole. Over his lifetime, Gibbons met every American president, from Andrew Johnson to Warren G. Harding, and served as an adviser to several of them.

During the Second Plenary Council in 1866, Gibbons advocated for the creation of a Catholic university in the United States to educate priests and laymen. However, the proposal remained in limbo for the next 19 years.

In 1869 and 1870, Gibbons attended the First Vatican Council in Rome. Gibbons voted in favor of the doctrine of papal infallibility. He assumed the additional duties of apostolic administrator for the Diocese of Richmond, Virginia, in January 1872.

=== Bishop of Richmond ===
Gibbons was named by Pius IX as the fourth bishop of Richmond on July 30, 1872. He was installed as bishop on October 20, 1872.

=== Coadjutor archbishop and archbishop of Baltimore ===
On May 29, 1877, Pius IX named Gibbons as coadjutor archbishop of Baltimore. He automatically succeeded as archbishop on October 3, 1877, after the death of Archbishop James Bayley. For the first twenty years of his administration, Gibbons had no auxiliary bishop to assist him. He therefore travelled extensively throughout the archdiocese, coming to know the priests and parishioners very well.

=== Cardinal ===
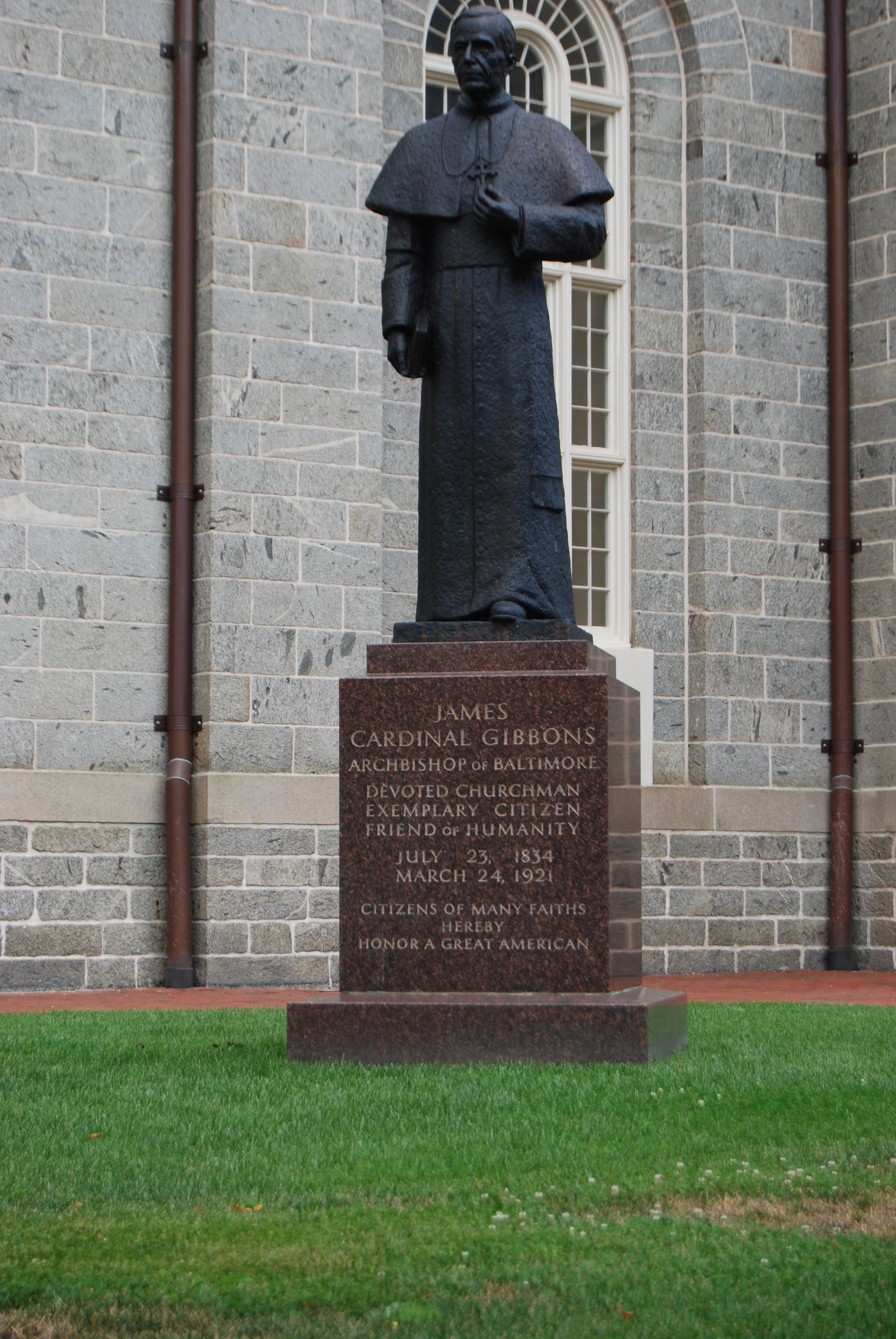
Cardinal Gibbons statue outside of the Baltimore Basilica (2008)

On June 7, 1886, Pope Leo XIII created Gibbons as a cardinal priest and on March 17, 1887, assigned him the titular church of Santa Maria in Trastevere in Rome. He was the second American cardinal after Cardinal John McCloskey.

In 1885, the bishops in the Third Plenary Council in Baltimore decided to build the Catholic University of America in the District of Columbia. The university opened on March 7, 1889, with Gibbons serving as its first chancellor.In 1903, Gibbons became the first American cardinal to participate in a papal conclave. He would have participated in the 1914 conclave but he arrived late.

During World War I, Gibbons was instrumental in the establishment of the National Catholic War Council. He allowed Reverend William A Hemmick to serve American troops in France during the war. Hemmick became known as the patriot priest of Picardy. At the end of the war, Gibbons supported American participation in the new League of Nations.

James Gibbons died on March 24, 1921, in Baltimore at age 86.

== Viewpoints ==
=== Americanism ===
In 1899, Gibbons became embroiled in a controversy with the Vatican about a biography of Reverend Isaac Hecker, the founder of the Paulist Fathers. A biography, Life of Isaac Hecker, had recently been published in French. The Vatican decided that the preface to the French edition contained controversial opinions about individualism and liberalism. The translator, Abbé Félix Klein, had attributed those views to Hecker. The book inflamed an ongoing dispute over Americanism, liberal attitudes on obedience to papal authority in the United States that the Vatican considered a heresy.

On January 22, 1899, Leo XIII sent Gibbons an encyclical, Testem benevolentiae nostrae ("Concerning New Opinions, Virtue, Nature and Grace, with Regard to Americanism"). The encyclical condemned the Hecker biography for Americanism. In response, Gibbons and other American church leaders assured the pope that the opinions in the book preface belonged to Klein, not Hecker. They further asserted that Hecker never promoted any deviation from or minimization of Catholic doctrines.

=== Relations with Jews ===
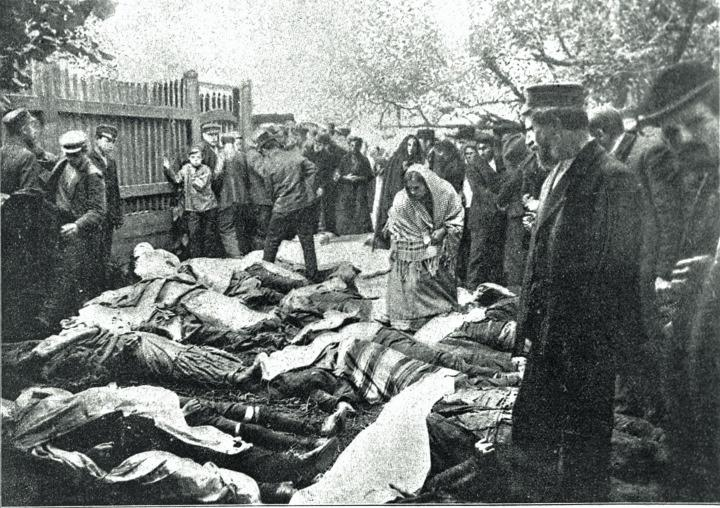
Russian pogrom of Jews (1906)

During his tenures in North Carolina, Virginia and Maryland, Gibbons established cordial relationships with local rabbis. In an 1890 letter, Gibbons said:

For my part I cannot well conceive how Christians can entertain other than most kindly sentiments toward the Hebrew race, when I consider how much we are indebted to them. We have from them the inspired volume of the Old Testament which has been consolation in all ages to devout souls. Christ our Lord, the Founder of our religion, His Blessed Mother, as well as the apostles, were all Jews according to the flesh. These facts attach me strongly to the Jewish race.

In 1890, Gibbons condemned pogroms targeting Jews in the Russian Empire. In 1903, he condemned the Kishinev pogrom in present-day Chișinău, Moldova, in which rioters killed 49 Jews and injured hundreds more. He pleaded for the public to assist Russia's Jews. When Jewish leaders in 1915 in Ohio were opposing a state law that would promote Bible readings in public schools, Gibbons sent them a letter of support. During World War I, he supported American Jewish Relief fundraising in Baltimore.

=== Women's suffrage ===
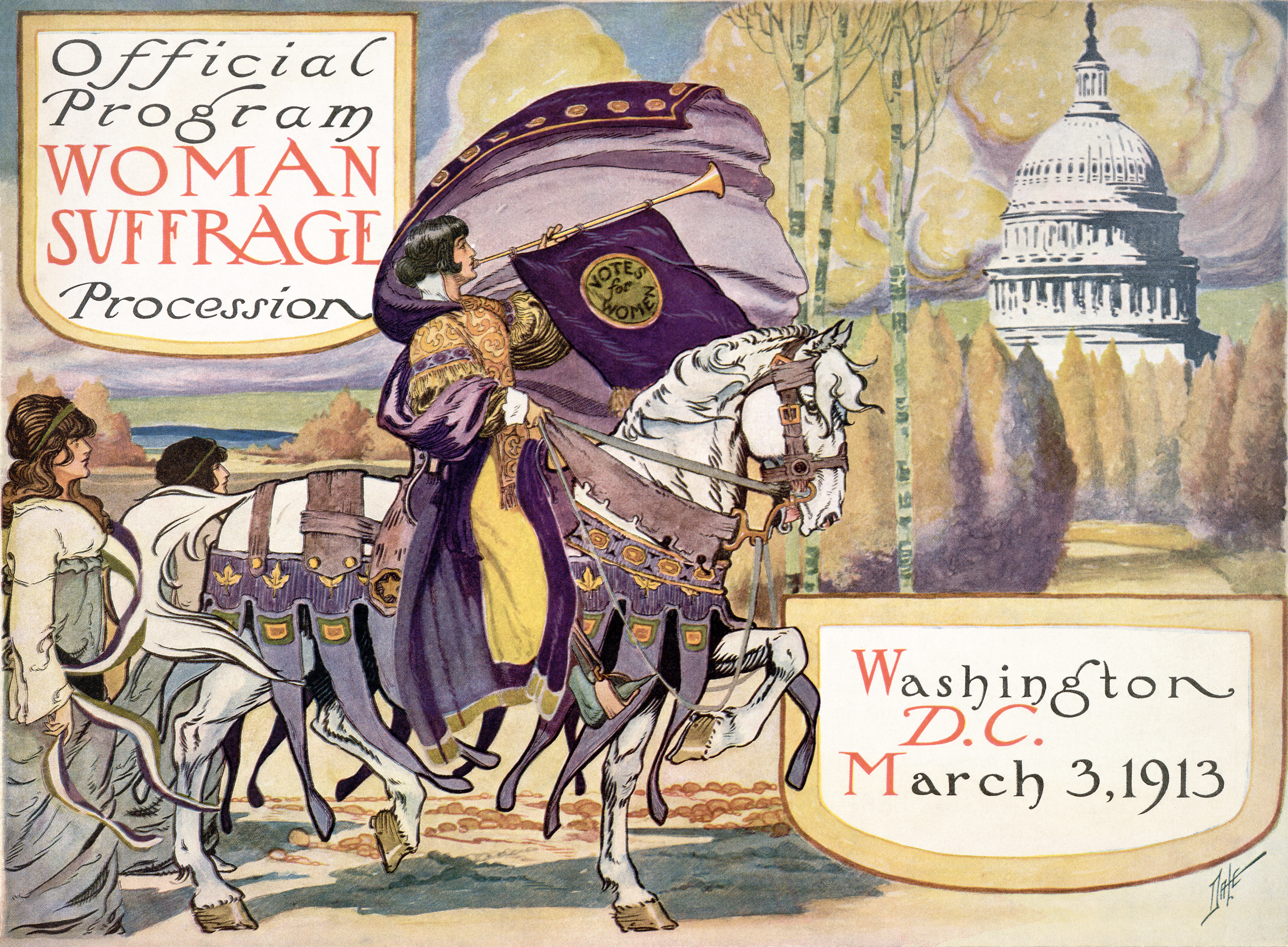
Women's Suffrage Procession, Washington D.C. (1913)

Gibbons initially opposed the women's suffrage movement in the United States. However, when the nineteenth amendment to the US Constitution passed in 1920, allowing women to vote, Gibbons urged women to exercise that right, describing it "...not only as a right but as a strict social duty."

=== Organized labor ===
Gibbons advocated for the protection of working people and their right to organize in labor unions. He believed that industrials in America's eastern cities were exploiting Catholic immigrant workers. He was once quoted as saying, "It is the right of laboring classes to protect themselves, and the duty of the whole people to find a remedy against avarice, oppression, and corruption." Gibbons played a key role in the granting of papal permission for Catholics to join labor unions.

Regarding manual labor Gibbons said that "the Savior of mankind never conferred a greater temporal boon on mankind than by ennobling and sanctifying manual labor, and by rescuing it from the stigma of degradation which had been branded upon it", adding that "Christ is ushered Into the world not amid pomp and splendor of imperial majesty, but amid the environments of an humble child of toil. He is the reputed son of an artisan, and his early manhood is spent in a mechanic’s shop". He concluded that "every honest labor is laudable, thanks to the example and teaching of Christ".

In Rome in 1887 Gibbons implored the Vatican not to condemn the Knights of Labor and defended the rights of workers to organise.

=== Colonialism ===
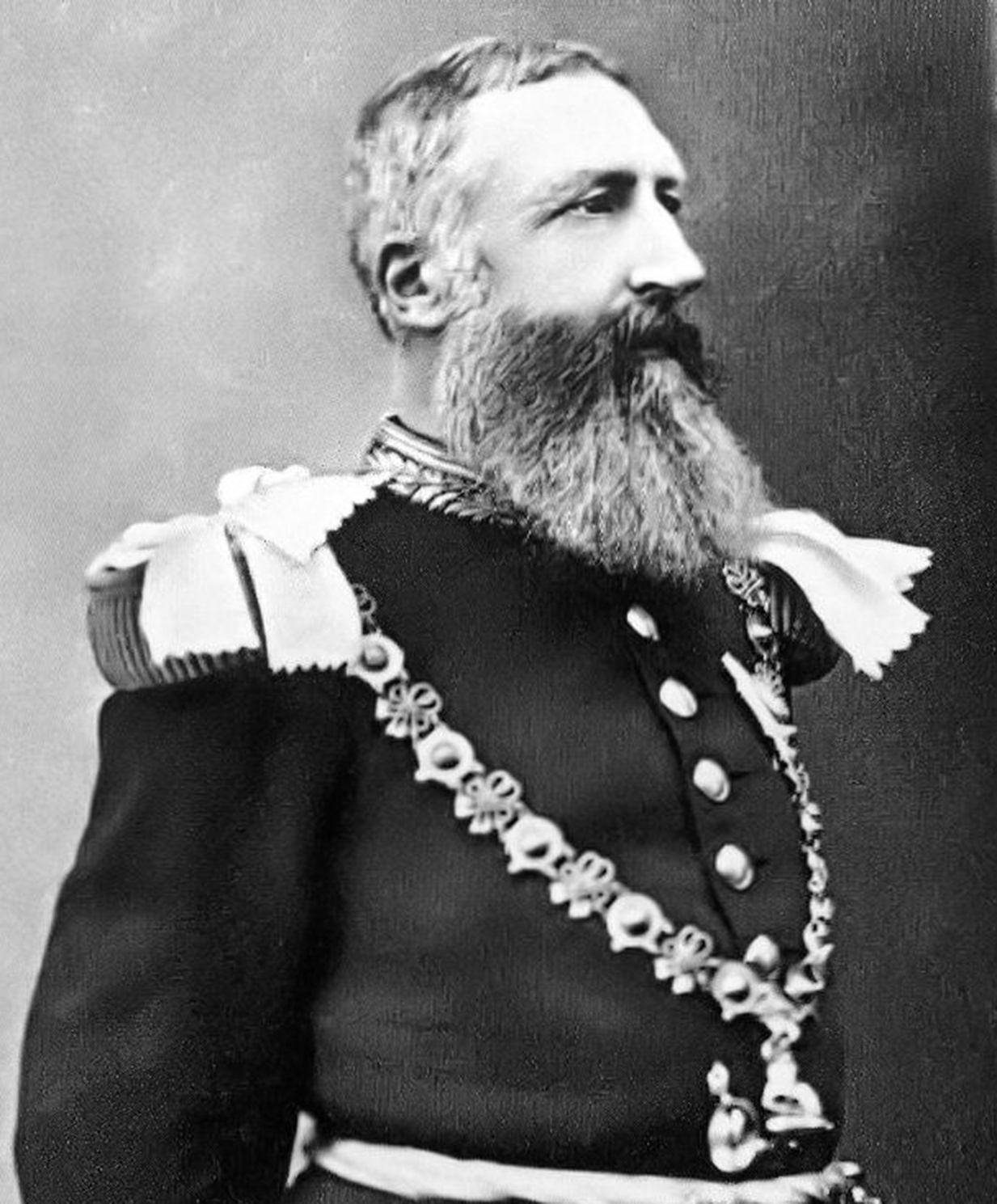
King Leopold II of Belgium (pre-1891)

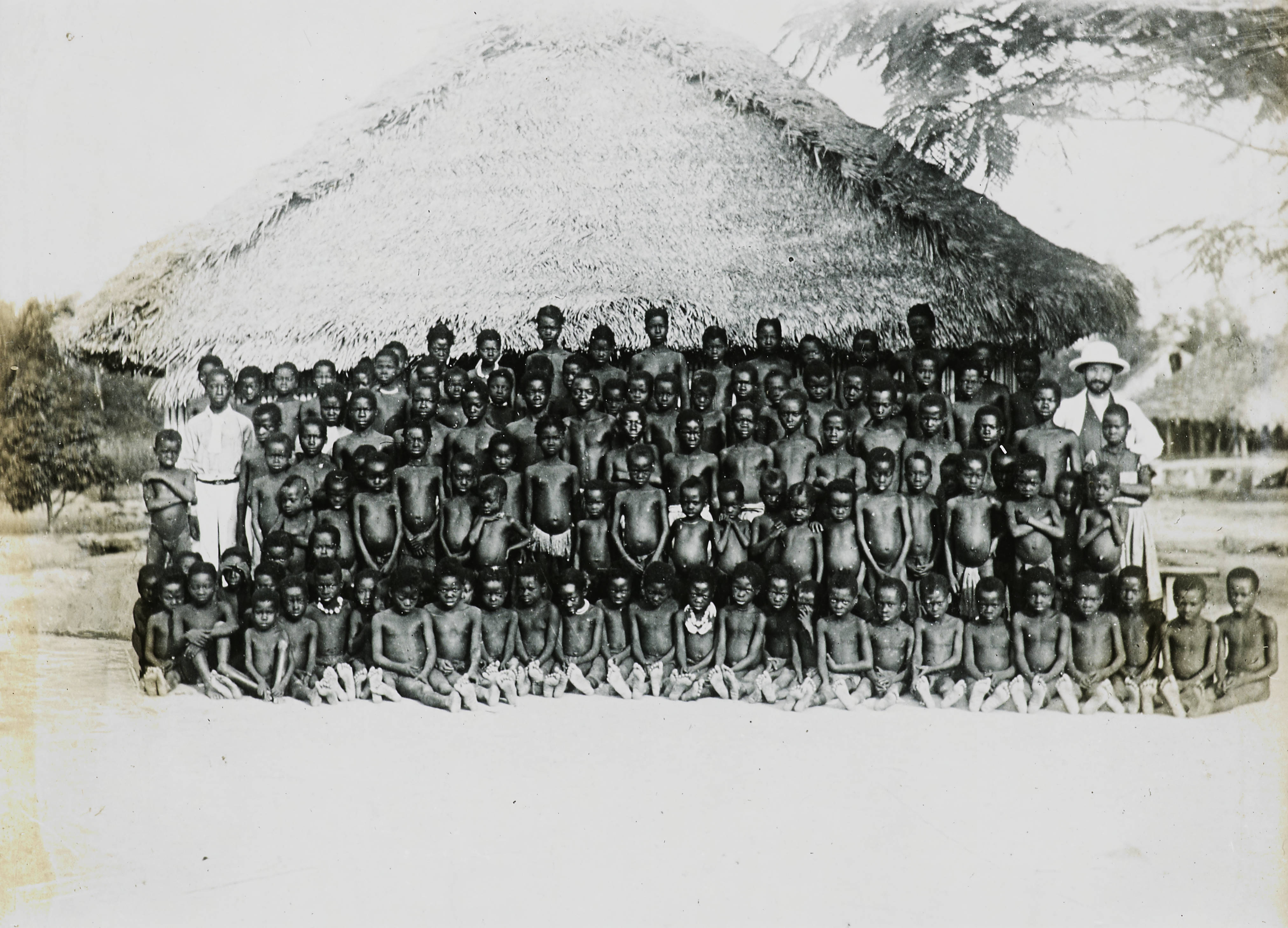
Balolo Mission in Belgium Congo 1900 to 1910

In early 1904, Congolese activists established the Congo Reform Association in England to protest atrocities and injustices against the people of the Congo Free State in Africa. It was a colony under the direct control of King Leopold II, the Catholic king of Belgium. In October 1904, organizers were staging the 13th Universal Peace Congress in Boston, Massachusetts, with Congo being on the agenda. The Belgian Government protested this topic because the organizers had not invited Leopold II to send a representative. At the request of the Belgians, Gibbons wrote a letter to the organizers, asking them to drop discussion of Congo. Gibbons' efforts not only failed to sway the organizers, but made him the target of much criticism. Gibbons responded to his critics, saying "I fear, that this agitation against King Leopold's administration is animated partly by religious jealousy and partly by commercial rivalry." He feared that the British Government, along with British merchants and Protestant missionaries, were conspiring to expel Catholic missionaries from the Congo.

According to the historian John Tracy Ellis, rival business and religious interests were indeed supporting the Congo Reform Association. However, Leopold was exploiting and oppressing the Congolese population. Furthermore, Gibbons had based his support on the views of the Belgian government and intermittent reports from Catholic missionaries. Said Ellie;

"For one of the few times in Gibbons' long life, his normally keen judgment went astray and exposed him to the charge of partisanship and of ignorance of the facts governing an issue. The cardinal should have steered clear of the case."

Author Adam Hochschild’s book, King Leopold’s Ghost, gives a less flattering account of Gibbons' involvement with the Congo issue;

"[King Leopold’s] representatives in Rome successfully convinced the Vatican that this Catholic king was being set upon by unscrupulous Protestant missionaries. A stream of messages in Latin flowed from the Holy See across the Atlantic to the designated Catholic point-man for Leopold in the United States, James Cardinal Gibbons of Baltimore. Cardinal Gibbons believed that the Congo reform crusade was the work of "only a handful of discontented men... depending largely upon the untrustworthy hearsay of the natives."

Leopold later awarded Gibbons with the Grand Cross of the Order of the Crown for his assistance. His support of Leopold gained the recognition of Pope Pius X.

== Works ==
=== The Faith of Our Fathers ===
During his many speaking engagements as a priest, Gibbons' audiences included many Protestants wanting to learn about Catholicism. He wanted to recommend books on Catholicism to interested Protestants, but he found the existing apologetical works to be inadequate for Americans. To fill that need, Gibbons in 1876 published The Faith of Our Fathers: A Plain Exposition and Vindication of the Church Founded by Our Lord Jesus Christ.

Understanding that many Americans viewed their faith as coming directly from the Bible, Gibbons took pains to explain the biblical roots of Catholic doctrine and rituals. He also wanted to show readers that Catholicism was an American faith, rebutting the claims by anti-Catholic nativists that Catholicism was a heretical belief imposed by Europeans.

The first printing of 10,000 copies, a large number for that era, sold out quickly. By 1879, 50,000 copies had been sold. Sales reached 1,400,000 by 1917 and it remained the most popular book in the United States until the publication of the novel Gone With the Wind in 1939.

=== Other publications ===
- Our Christian Heritage, (1889)
- The Ambassador of Christ, (1896)
- The Faith of Our Fathers, (1905).
- Discourses and Sermons (1908)
- A Retrospect of Fifty Years, (1916)

Gibbons wrote essays for the North American Review and Putnams' Monthly. He was also a contributor to the Catholic Encyclopedia.

== See also ==
- Catholic Church in the United States
- Historical list of the Catholic bishops of the United States
- James Cardinal Gibbons Medal
- List of Catholic bishops of the United States
- Lists of patriarchs, archbishops, and bishops
- Papal infallibility

Catholic Church titles
Preceded by Erected	Vicar Apostolic of North Carolina; March 3, 1868 – May 20, 1877	Succeeded by Stanislao Marco Gross
Preceded by Vincenzo Cima	Titular Bishop of Adramyttium; March 3, 1868 – July 30, 1872	Succeeded by Louis-Taurin Cahagne, O.F.M.Cap.
Preceded by John McGill	Bishop of Richmond; July 30, 1872 – May 20, 1877	Succeeded by John Joseph Keane
Preceded by Wincenty Lipski	Titular Bishop of Ionopolis; May 29 – October 3, 1877	Succeeded by Francis Xavier Leray
Preceded by James Roosevelt Bayley	Archbishop of Baltimore; October 3, 1877 – March 24, 1921	Succeeded by Michael Joseph Curley
Preceded by Lorenzo Nina	Cardinal-Priest of Santa Maria in Trastevere; March 17, 1887 – March 24, 1921	Succeeded by Giovanni Tacci Porcelli
