= The Faith of Our Fathers =

The Faith of Our Fathers: a Plain Exposition and Vindication of the Church Founded by Our Lord Jesus Christ is a book by archbishop James Gibbons which was published in Baltimore in 1876, which became a best-selling apologetical work in the United States and by 1980 was in its 111th printing.

In his 1917 preface to the 83rd edition, the Cardinal noted that "since the first edition appeared, in 1876 up to the present time, fourteen hundred thousand copies have been published and the circulation of the book is constantly increasing. The work has been translated into nearly all the languages of Europe." The well-known agnostic, literary critic and fellow Baltimorean H. L. Mencken wrote, in his survey of religion Treatise on the Gods, that "the best exposition of Catholic doctrine is probably The Faith of our Fathers', by the late Cardinal Gibbons."
