= Reuben Parsons (priest) =

American Catholic priest and author

Rev. Reuben Parsons, D.D. (1841 – 13 April 1906) was an American Catholic priest and author.

== Biography ==
Reuben Parsons was born in Paterson, Passaic County, New Jersey and was ordained priest in 1866. He received his early education at Mount St. Mary's University, and later at the Pontifical North American College. For thirteen years Parson was chaplain of St. Joseph's Hospital in Yonkers, where he died after a long illness.

== Works ==
- (1872). A Biographical Dictionary. New York: D. & J. Sadlier & Co.
- (1892). Some Lies and Errors of History. Notre Dame, IND.: Office of the "Ave Maria".
- (1896-1900). Studies in Church History:
  - (1896). Vol. I: Centuries I-VIII. New York: Fr. Pustet & Co.
  - (1896). Vol. II: Centuries IX-XIV. New York: Fr. Pustet & Co.
  - (1897). Vol. III: Centuries XV-XVI. New York: Fr. Pustet & Co.
  - (1897). Vol. IV: Centuries XVII-XVIII. New York: Fr. Pustet & Co.
  - (1898). Vol. V: Century XIX (Part I). New York: Fr. Pustet & Co.
  - (1900). Vol. VI: Century XIX (Part II). New York: Fr. Pustet & Co.
- (1902). Universal History. Yonkers, N.Y. [10 vols.]
- (1908). Sermons. Philadelphia, Pa.: J.J. McVey.

=== Selected articles ===
- (1887). "Pope Clement VIII. and Beatrice Cenci," The American Catholic Quarterly Review 12, pp. 29–38.
- (1887). "The Charge of Heresy against Dante," The American Catholic Quarterly Review 12, pp. 714–725.
- (1894). "A Glance at the Soldier Monks," The Catholic World, Vol. LIX, pp. 502–521.
- (1895). "The Eight Centennial of the First Crusade," The Rosary Magazine 7, pp. 16–23.
- (1895). "Gustavus Adolphus," The American Catholic Quarterly Review 20, pp. 510–527.
- (1896). "Explorers in the Middle Age: Marco Polo," The American Catholic Quarterly Review 21, pp. 43–52.
- (1896). "The Baptism of France," The American Catholic Quarterly Review 21, pp. 497–517.
- (1897). "A Glance at the Reign of St. Louis," The American Catholic Quarterly Review 22, pp. 47–73
- (1897). "Lacordaire and Lamennais," The American Catholic Quarterly Review 22, pp. 256–279.
- (1897). "The Struggle of Polish Catholicity with Russian Orthodoxy," The American Catholic Quarterly Review 22, pp. 694–723.
- (1898). "The Later Religious Martyrdom of Poland," The American Catholic Quarterly Review 23, pp. 71–96.
- (1898). "Freemasonry in Latin America," The American Catholic Quarterly Review 23, pp. 802–835.
- (1899). "The Third French Republic as a Persecutor of the Church," The American Catholic Quarterly Review 24, No. 96, pp. 1–18.
- (1900). "Some Heterodoxies and Inconsintencies of Russian 'Orthodoxy'," The American Catholic Quarterly Review 25, pp. 675–696.
- (1902). "The Commencements of the Normans," The American Catholic Quarterly Review 27, pp. 32–53.
- (1903). "The Historical and Religious Origin of Our Recent Immigrants from Eastern Europe," The American Catholic Quarterly Review 28, pp. 37–59.
- (1904). "Feudalism, Chivalry and the Communes in the Middle Age," The American Catholic Quarterly Review 29, pp. 39–51.
- (1910). "Early Days of the American College," in History of the American College. New York: Benziger Brothers.
