= Félix Klein =

French priest, theologian and author (1862–1953)

Abbé Félix Klein (12 July 1862 in Château-Chinon (Ville) – 30 December 1953 in Gargenville) was a French priest, theologian and author who taught at the Institut Catholique de Paris.

In the United States, he is known as the author of the introduction of Comtesse de Ravilliax's French translation of Walter Elliott's Life of Father Hecker (1896), which started the Americanism controversy.

Klein was made a Knight of the Legion of Honour in 1952. Many of Klein's personal papers are kept in the University of Notre Dame Archives.

== Sources ==
- Guy Thuillier, "Un Nivernais professeur à l’Institut catholique : l’abbé Félix Klein (1862-1953)", Mémoires de la Société académique du Nivernais, t. 73, 1993, p. 65- 75.
