= Multicultural particularism =

Belief that a common culture for all people is either undesirable or impossible

Multicultural particularism is the belief that a common culture for all people is either undesirable or impossible. In discussions of multiculturalism, historian and educator Diane Ravitch draws a distinction between what she terms "pluralistic" and "particularistic" varieties and suggests that other writers often blur or ignore this distinction.

In a long essay about multiculturalism in American education, Ravitch praises the inclusiveness of multicultural pluralism while decrying what she sees as multiple flaws and failures of multicultural particularism.
