= Americanism (Catholic Church) =

Cultural resistance to Church authority among some New World Catholics

Americanism was a political and religious outlook attributed to some American Catholics around the turn of the 20th century and denounced by the Holy See. It allegedly sought to adapt Catholic doctrine to American culture and democratic values, emphasizing active virtues, individualism, and personal conscience over traditional, "passive" virtues like obedience and contemplation.

In the 1890s, European "continental conservative" clerics detected signs of modernism or classical liberalism, which Pope Pius IX had condemned in the Syllabus of Errors in 1864, among the beliefs and teachings of many members of the American Catholic hierarchy, who denied the charges. Pope Leo XIII wrote against these ideas in a letter to Cardinal James Gibbons, published as Testem benevolentiae nostrae.

The long-term result was that the Irish Catholics who largely controlled the Catholic Church in the United States increasingly demonstrated loyalty to the pope, and suppressed traces of liberal thought in Catholic colleges. At bottom, the conflict was cultural, as conservative American Catholics from continental Europe, angered at the heavy attacks on the Catholic Church in Germany, France and other countries, sought to weaken individualist attitudes among American Catholics.

== In Europe ==
During the French Third Republic, which began in 1870, the power and influence of French Catholicism steadily declined. The French government passed laws bearing more and more stringently on the Catholic church, and the majority of French citizens did not object. Indeed, they began to look toward legislators and not to the clergy for guidance.

Observing this, and encouraged by the action of Pope Leo XIII, who in 1892 called on French Catholics to accept the Republic, several young French priests set themselves to stop the decline in church power. They determined that because the church was predominantly sympathetic to the monarchists and hostile to the Republic, and because it held itself aloof from modern philosophies and practices, people had turned away from it. Some progressive priests believed that the church had not adapted to modern needs. They began a domestic apostolate which had for one of its rallying cries, "Allons au peuple" ("Let us go to the people"). They agitated for social and philanthropic projects, for closer contacts between priests and parishioners, and for general cultivation of personal initiative, both in clergy and in laity. They looked for inspiration to America, where they saw a vigorous church among a free people, with priests publicly respected, and with a note of aggressive zeal in every project of Catholic enterprise.

=== Isaac Hecker ===
Isaac Hecker

In the 1890s, this issue was brought forcefully to the attention of European Catholics by Comtesse de Ravilliax's translation of a biography of Isaac Hecker by the Paulist priest Walter Elliott in 1891; the book's introduction by Félix Klein drew ire from the Vatican. Hecker, commonly known as "The Yellow Dart", had been dead for years at this point and had never been viewed by the Pope with disfavor. The French translation of Hecker's biography and Klein's introduction to the book made him appear to have been much more of a radical than he in fact was.

Hecker had sought to reach out to Protestant Americans by stressing certain points of Catholic teaching, but Pope Leo XIII understood that effort as a watering down of Catholic doctrine. Hecker also had used terms such as "natural virtue", which to the pope suggested the Pelagian heresy. Because members of the Paulist Fathers took promises but not the vows of religious orders, many concluded that Hecker denied the need for external authority.

The French liberals particularly admired Hecker for his love of modern times and modern liberty and his devotion to liberal Catholicism. Indeed, they took him as a kind of patron saint. Inspired by Hecker's life and character, the activist French priests undertook the task of persuading their fellow-priests to accept the political system, and then to break out of their isolation, put themselves in touch with the intellectual life of the country, and take an active part in the work of social amelioration. In 1897, the movement received a new impetus when Denis J. O'Connell, former rector of the Pontifical North American College in Rome, spoke on behalf of Hecker's ideas at the Catholic Congress in Fribourg.

=== Opposition ===
Some Catholics complained to the Pope, and in 1898, Charles Maignen wrote an ardent polemic against the new movement called Le Père Hecker, est-il un saint? ("Is Father Hecker a Saint?"). The critiques of European conservatives were reinforced by those of German American Catholic bishops in the Midwest, such as Frederick Katzer and John Joseph Frederick Otto Zardetti, who were deeply concerned by how completely Americanist Bishops of Irish descent like John Ireland, John J. Keane, and James Gibbons had come to dominate the American Catholic Church. Arthur Preuss (1871–1934), the foremost German American Catholic intellectual in the United States, was an outspoken enemy, filling his scholarly journal Fortnightly Review with criticisms of Americanist theology.

Many powerful Vatican authorities also opposed the "Americanist" tendency. Pope Leo XIII was reluctant to chastise the American Catholics, whom he had often praised for their loyalty and faith. In 1899 he wrote Cardinal Gibbons, "It is clear ... that those opinions that, taken as a whole, some designate as 'Americanism' cannot have our approval."

== Opposition ==
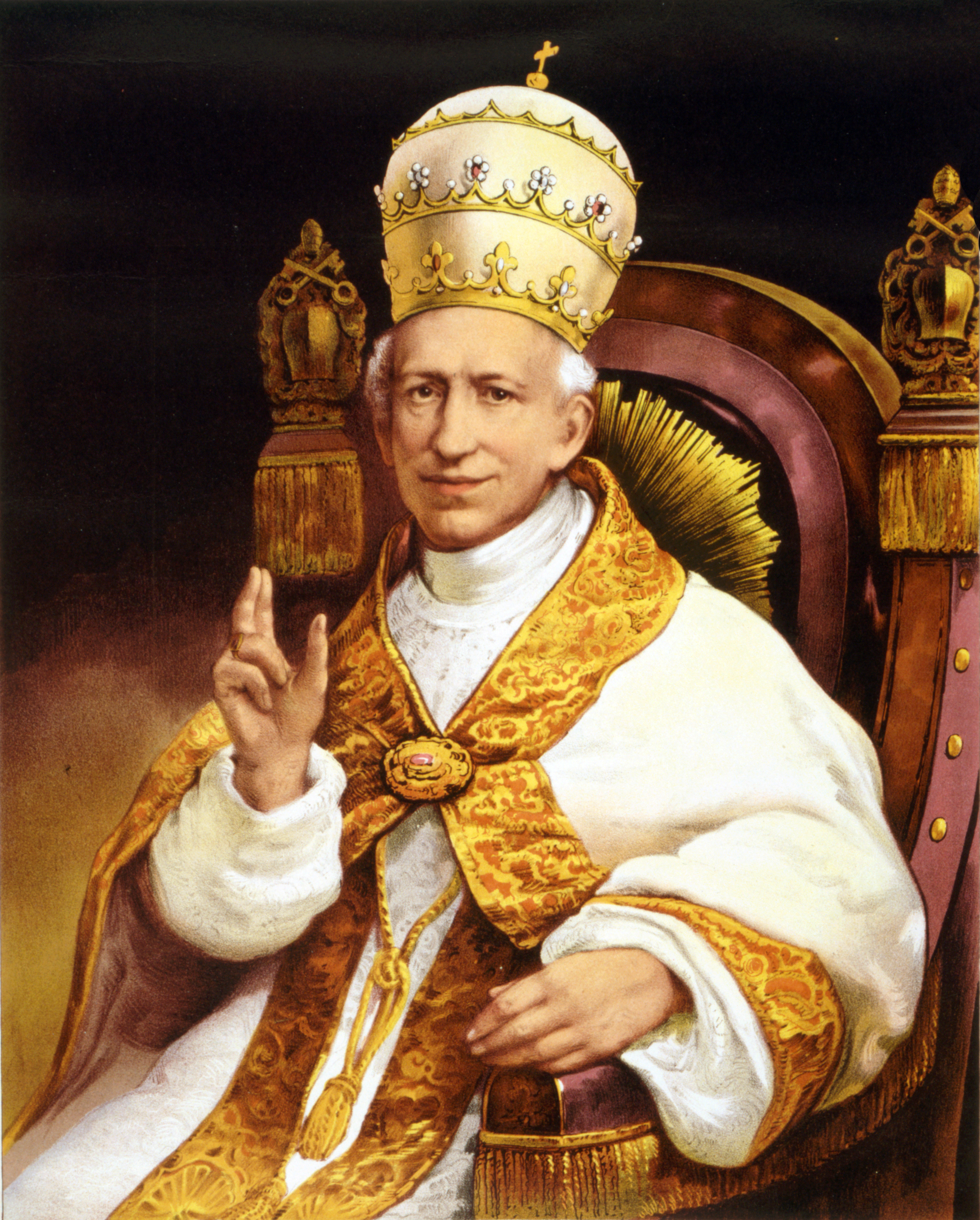
Pope Leo XIII

In the 1895 encyclical Longinqua oceani ("Wide Expanse of the Ocean"), Pope Leo XIII indicated a generally positive view of the American Church, commenting mostly on the success of Catholicism in the US but also noting the view that the church "would bring forth more abundant fruits if, in addition to liberty, she enjoyed the favor of the laws and the patronage of the public authority." Leo warned the American church hierarchy not to support this unique system of separation of church and state.

In 1898, Leo XIII lamented for America where church and state are "dissevered and divorced", and wrote of his preference for a closer relationship between the Catholic Church and the State, along European lines. His 1898 letter Testem benevolentiae nostrae warned the Catholic Church in the United States against the trend towards individualism and the idea of separation of church and state. It was addressed to James Gibbons, Archbishop of Baltimore.

Pope Leo XIII also expressed concerns about the cultural liberalism of some American Catholics: he pointed out that the faithful could not decide doctrine for themselves. He emphasized that Catholics should obey the magisterial teaching authority of the church. In general, he deemed it dangerous to expose children to schools that would prove to be detrimental to their Christian upbringing. The Pope derided the idea that all opinions should be aired publicly, as he felt certain speech could harm general morality. He also condemned the biography of Hecker and Americanism.

This document condemned the following doctrines or tendencies:

- Undue insistence on interior initiative in the spiritual life, as leading to disobedience
- Attacks on religious vows, and disparagement of the value of religious orders in the modern world
- Minimizing Catholic doctrine
- Minimizing the importance of spiritual direction

The brief did not assert that Hecker and the Americans had held any unsound doctrine on the above points. Instead, it merely stated that if such opinions did exist, the local hierarchy was to eradicate them.

=== American response ===
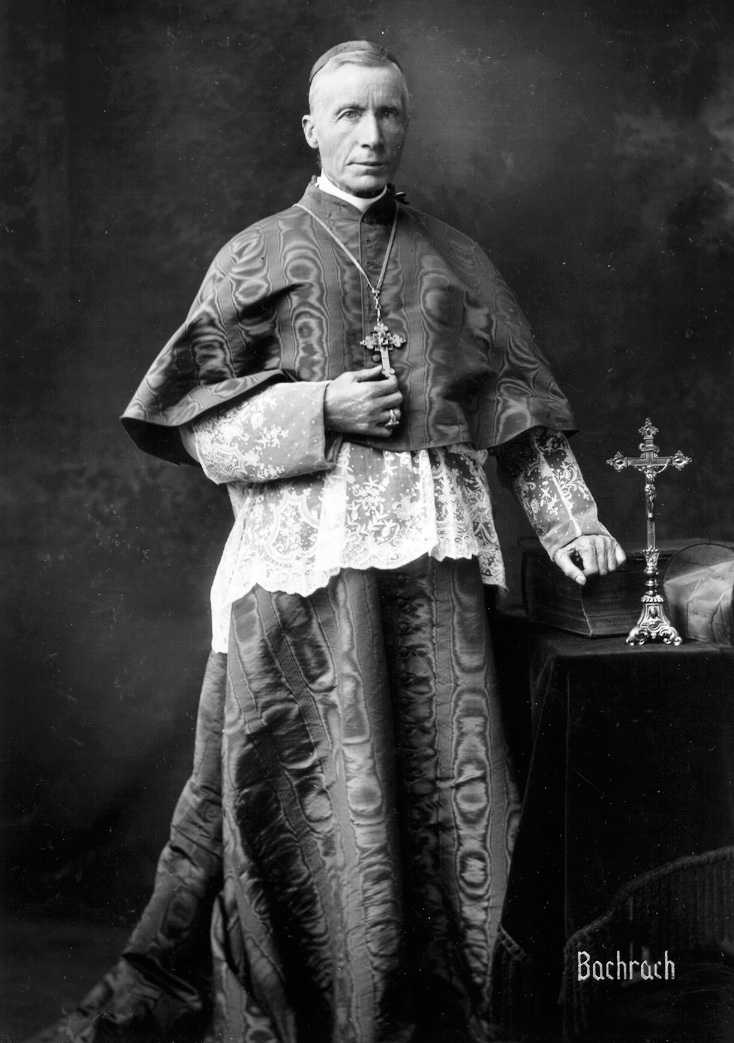
James Gibbons, cardinal archbishop of Baltimore

In response to Testem benevolentiae, Gibbons and many other American prelates replied to Rome with a near-unanimous voice, denying that American Catholics held any of the condemned views. They asserted that Hecker had never countenanced the slightest departure from Catholic principles in their fullest and most strict application.

The disturbance caused by the condemnation was slight; almost the entire laity and a considerable part of the clergy were unaware of this affair. The Pope's brief did end up strengthening the position of the conservatives in France. Leo's pronouncements effectively ended the Americanist movement and curtailed the activities of American progressive Catholics. Historian Thomas McAvoy argues there were grave long-term negative effects on the intellectual life of American Catholics.

Bernard McQuaid, bishop of Rochester, was a forerunner of the Americanism dispute. He was quick to recognize the mingling of liberalism and Catholicism—which he called "false Americanism"—and distinguish it from living the ideals of republicanism and democracy—"true Americanism". McQuaid was very suspicious of secret societies, non-Catholic schooling, and even some of his fellow bishops. He was particularly concerned about John Ireland, John Keane, and James Cardinal Gibbons, all of whom McQuaid considered "too conciliatory to Protestant-minded America".

John Ireland, archbishop of Saint Paul, Minnesota and a foremost modernizer, had to take extreme care to avoid condemnation for his views. Ireland, joined by John J. Keane, archbishop of Dubuque, sought to adapt the social and religious values of the Catholic Church to American political and cultural values, especially religious liberty, separation of church and state, cooperation with non-Catholics, and lay participation in ecclesiastical decisionmaking. Many of his ideas were implicitly condemned by Pope Leo XIII's Testem benevolentiae (1899) as Americanism. Nevertheless, Ireland continued to promote his views. When similar European views were condemned by Pope Pius X's Pascendi Dominici gregis (1907), Ireland actively campaigned against modernism. This apparently inconsistent behavior stemmed from Ireland's concept of a "golden mean" between "ultraconservatism", rendering the Catholic church irrelevant, and "ultraliberalism", discarding the church's message.

== Americanization ==
Others, such as Orestes Brownson—an abolitionist Catholic public intellectual—were not satisfied with the system of national parishes. Considered an Americanizer, he advocated for immigrants to believe their Catholic identities supersede national divides and personally opposed training priests in the ethnically divided American seminaries. Bishop John Hughes believed that Brownson was part of a "'club' of liberal intellectuals ... who wanted to Americanize the church". He publicly denounced Brownson for giving the 1860 commencement address at Fordham University.

== See also ==
- 19th-century history of the Catholic Church in the United States
- Cafeteria Catholicism
- American Islam (term), similar term in Islam
