= Moderne Leben-Jesu-Forschung unter dem Einflusse der Psychiatrie =

Book by Philipp Kneib published in 1908

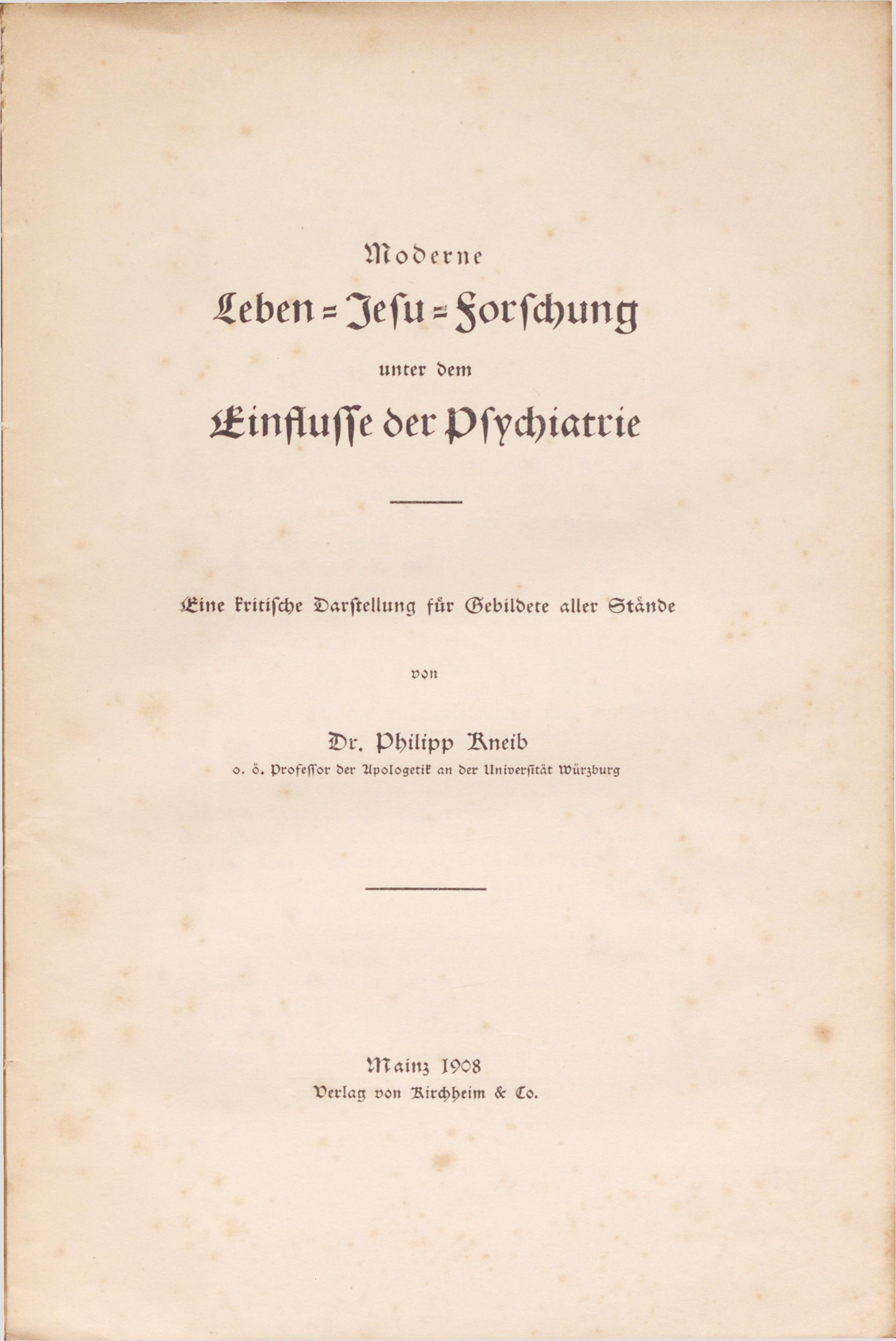
Title page of the book

Moderne Leben-Jesu-Forschung unter dem Einflusse der Psychiatrie (English: Modern Quest for the Historical Jesus Under the Influence of Psychiatry) is a book published in 1908 by Philipp Kneib. In the years before the publication, several authors had brought up the notion that Jesus was not divine, but rather an influential mentally ill individual. Kneib tries to reject this idea in his book by discussing the general possibility of miracles and the resurrection of Jesus. He further deals with every argument for the notion that Jesus was mentally ill and brings up counterarguments. By upholding the believe that Jesus was sane, Kneib tries to reinforce the belief in Jesus' divinity.

== Context ==
=== Author ===
The author of the book, Philipp Kneib (19 February 1870 in Zornheim, Germany – 21 Juli 1915 in Würzburg, Germany), was ordained as a catholic priest in 1895, started teaching in 1899, and was appointed professor of moral theology in 1903. During his time as a teacher and as a professor, Kneib published multiple books in relation to theology. In line with his education, he always defended the Catholic ideology in these books, with the aim to reinforce the believe in Christianity. For example, in "Die Beweise für die Unsterblichkeit der Seele aus allgemeinen psychologischen Tatsachen" he tries to prove the "immortality of the soul by means of common psychological facts". Moderne Leben-Jesu-Forschung unter dem Einflusse der Psychiatrie matches well in this series of publication as the topic is deeply theological and Kneib makes it explicit that he wants to strengthen the Christian believe with his arguments. Consistent with his theological background and his previous publications, he also aims to uphold the believe in Jesus as a divine representative of God. However, it is the only book published by him that deals with a psychiatric topic.

=== Quest for the Historical Jesus ===
Moderne Leben-Jesu-Forschung unter dem Einflusse der Psychiatrie is part of a broader movement of the quest for the historical Jesus. The aim of this movement is to investigate which aspects of Jesus' life can be attributed to the historical Jesus and tries to make a historically accurate portrayal of his doings and personal characteristics. Shortly after the end of Enlightenment, the first attempts to produce biographies of Jesus' life were made. They often either served the purpose to doubt the historicity of Jesus as he is described in the bible, or they made a romanticised portrayal of his life and intentions. These biographies were only loosely based on the Gospels and often disregarded the parts of the gospels that did not fit in the scheme. The most influential publication in this early phase of the quest was contributed by David Strauss in 1835. He asserted that Jesus existed, but that he was not divine. His claims were substantiated on more solid grounds than those of his predecessors. The title of his publication ("Das Leben Jesu"; English: "The life of Jesus") coined the German term for the field (Leben-Jesu-Forschung), which was also used in the title of Kneib's book. In 1906, two years before the publication of Moderne Leben-Jesu-Forschung unter dem Einflusse der Psychiatrie, Albert Schweitzer published his influential book Von Weimarus zu Wrede: eine Geschichte der Leben-Jesu-Forschung (English version: The quest of the historical Jesus). He reviewed the publications that had been made so far and pointed out major methodological shortcomings in the field. The criticism in this book largely decreased the research in relation to the quest for the historical Jesus for nearly the next 50 years.

By using the name of the field in the title of his book, Kneib relates his own work to the movement of the quest for the historical Jesus. It is one of the latest publication in this phase of the quest for the historical Jesus. Similar to the other authors of this movement, the foundation of his arguments are the literal words of the bible. He thereby ignores the criticism that had been expressed by Schweitzer two years before.

=== Challenging the Sanity of Jesus ===
During the course of the quest for the historical Jesus, attempts to challenge the sanity of Jesus were made, starting in the second half of the 18th century. The first to do so was Jean Meslier in his Testament, published in 1773. He aimed to prove that Jesus was "a madman, a fanatic". This notion was repeated in similar form by several other authors, including David F. Strauss, up until right before the publication of Kneib's book and continue til today.

Moderne Leben-Jesu-Forschung unter dem Einflusse der Psychiatrie was a continuation of these publications that deal with the mental health of Jesus. However, it was one of the first books that took the opposite perspective. It aims to defend the mental health of Jesus against the arguments that had been raised. The book directly responds to four of the critics, all of whom had published their work in the early 20th century: Oskar Holtzmann, Georg Lomer, Emil Rasmussen, and Julius Baumann. Oskar Holtzmann (1903) diagnosed Jesus to be "ecstatic", which he described to be a pathologically strong excitability of the imagination and the power of will. Georg Lomer (1905) attempted to retrospectively diagnose Jesus as generally mentally ill, similarly to Meslier. Emil Rasmussen (1905) determined Jesus to be either epileptic or paranoid. Using a few examples, he developed a description of the typical pathological prophet ("Prophetentypus") and applied it to Jesus. Julius Baumann (1908) hypothesised that the abnormalities he found in Jesus' behaviour could be explained by an overstimulation of nerves (Nervenüberreizung). The criticism of these four authors was thought of Kneib to be representative for the general arguments against Jesus of Kneib's time. By refuting these arguments, he aimed to silence the general doubt on the historicity and divinity of Jesus and thereby wanted to reinforce the believe in the Christian teachings

== Contents ==
In his preface, Kneib points out that ever since recently the divine part of Jesus, had been neglected by some, and that it was not a taboo anymore to question the sanity of Jesus' human part. He consequently sets out to evaluate whether the arguments for why Jesus is mentally ill that had been brought forward by Lomer, Rasmussen, Baumann, and Holtzmann can be upheld after thorough analysis. The arguments by Lomer, Rasmussen, Baumann, and Holtzmann, as well as their refutation by Kneib rely entirely on biblical texts and their interpretation.

In the first part of his book, Kneib discusses whether miracles are possible in general and whether Jesus could have actually resurrected from the dead. He asserts that the authors he cites only arrive at their conclusion because they have the false presumption that the supernatural events in relation to Jesus' life are not possible. Since the denial of the divinity of Jesus is both the argument and the conclusion of this argument, it relies on circular reasoning.

After this part, Kneib starts to defend the sanity of Jesus against the arguments by Lomer, Rasmussen, Baumann, and Holtzmann. He goes through each point that had been raised by the other authors, by introducing their argument and then proposing a counterargument. He notices a high overlap of arguments between the four authors.

Lomer, Rasmussen, Baumann, and Holtzmann often compare Jesus to other allegedly mentally ill spiritual leaders or influential people in history like Goethe, Aristotle, or Muhammad, presuming a relationship between genius and mental illness. Rasmussen asserts that "everything that seems surprising about prophets can be observed on a daily basis in mental institutions". Kneib responds that the mental illness of other spiritual leaders does not necessitate the mental illness of Jesus. According to Kneib, Jesus cannot be compared to other spiritual leaders because of his "natural calmness" and "superiority", because of the verity of his prophecies and because he is the only prophet who performed true miracles. "His superhuman wisdom of teaching and his holiness in life and teaching are out of question." Lomer, Rasmussen, Baumann, and Holtzmann doubted the factuality of both Jeus' miracles and prophecies.

A central argument for why Jesus is not considered sane is that in the bible it is described how his contemporaries thought of him as mentally ill ("When his family heard about this, they went to take charge of him, for they said, 'He is out of his mind.'" -Mark 3:21). Kneib responds that Jesus was only seen as mentally ill by his contemporaries because he was different from what they had expected their Messiah to be. He was more simple and modest than he had been anticipated, and mental illness was used to explain this seeming abnormality, Kneib proclaims. He further argues that from the original text it is not clear whether it was Jesus' family who thought of him as "out of his mind", or the scholars of the time.

Lomer, Rasmussen, Baumann, and Holtzmann also note that Jesus, as described in the bible, is lacking human feelings. In particular they noticed a lack of sexual desire and empathy. According to them, in the bible there is no description of Jesus' sexual desire. Additionally, he describes heaven as being without sexual intercourse. This is interpreted as a pathological lack of sexual desire, which is supposedly similarly present in patients with epilepsy. According to Kneib, however, this passage rather expresses that there are clerical tasks which are more important than reproducing mankind. Jesus describes a heaven in which only the higher desires remain, which serve the mind and not the body, says Kneib. The lack of empathy is identified by Lomer, Rasmussen, Baumann, and Holtzmann among other things, in his relationship to his disciples. They assert that Jesus' disciples follow him as servants instead of as friends: Jesus does not allow them to say goodbye to their families or bury the dead father of one of them. Kneib instead presumes that the prohibition to say goodbye or to bury the dead are supposed to test the required "heroic willingness to sacrifice".

Lomer, Rasmussen, Baumann, and Holtzmann deduce from passages like Matthew 3: 16–17 ("As soon as Jesus was baptized, he went up out of the water. At that moment heaven was opened, and he saw the Spirit of God descending like a dove and alighting on him. And a voice from heaven said, 'This is my Son, whom I love; with him I am well pleased'") that Jesus experienced hallucinations. That the vision was co-experienced by John, Peter, and James they explained by assuming that Jesus must have forced his hallucination on them via "a kind of hypnosis". Kneib responds that the reason for the other authors to bring up this argument is that they have the "preexisting assumption that supernatural events are impossible".

Kneib ends his book with a conclusion on the question posed in the beginning, of whether Jesus was mentally ill or not.

Viewing Jesus as only human must lead to desperate attempts at explaining his live and character as seen in this book.

— Philipp Kneib, Leben-Jesu-Forschung unter dem EInflusse der Psychiatrie

He attributes the presence of people who doubt the legitimacy and divinity of Jesus to the existence of free will. He encourages to not be confused by this subjective "deviance", but to rather be led by the objective Catholic Church

== Reception ==
Neither before nor after the publication of Moderne Leben-Jesu-Forschung unter dem Einflusse der Psychiatrie, Kneib ever again made a publication that dealt with topics related to psychiatry or psychology. After finishing the current book, he published three more books, concerning arguments in favour of a Christian belief system, afterlife, and free will, before he died in 1915.

=== Reactions to Kneib's book ===
Although Kneib's book was one of the first to publicly defend the sanity of Jesus, it was not received well by the scientific community of the time. It is cited only sporadically in other scientific literature. In 1910, three years after the publication of Kneib's book, Albert Schweitzer published his book "The Quest of the Historical Jesus". This book summarised the history of an authentic portrayal of the historic Jesus and coined the English term for the field. Kneib's work is not mentioned once. Other authors, like Walter E. Bundy, criticise Kneib for his work:

It suffices to say that Kneib's pamphlet in no way constitutes a contribution to the solution of the problem of the psychic health of Jesus

— Walter Ernest Bundy, The Psychic Health of Jesus

Particularly, he holds against Kneib that he cites too little sources overall, and that his main source are the gospels. Because of this lack of scientific sources, he disregards Kneib's work as non-objective. It is further criticised by Hans Windisch, a German professor of theology and philosophy, that Kneib's explanations are too short and unelaborate to convince the opponents of his positions. Another point for criticism, brought forward by Albert Schweitzer in a later published book, is the lack of Kneib's medical background. He therefore questions the validity and reliability of Kneib's judgments.

=== Influence of Kneib's book ===
In the time during and after the publication of Kneib's book the discussion about Jesus' mental health continued, but was not much influenced by Kneib's work. Several authors continued to challenge the mental health of Jesus, non-regarding the arguments that had been brought forward by Kneib. In the same year of Kneib's publication Charles Binet-Sanglé published the first part of his four-volume work "La folie de Jesus" (English: The madness of Jesus) which prominently challenged the mental health of Jesus. He uses many of the same arguments that Kneib had already tried to refute, without acknowledging Kneib's publication. Similar conclusions to those of Binet-Sanglé are also drawn by William Hirsch who, in 1912, published his book Religion and Civilization: The Conclusions of a Psychiatrist. Again, the work of Kneib is not acknowledged in his arguments. In the end, he concluded that Jesus was mentally ill: "But Christ offers in every respect an absolutely typical picture of a well-known mental disease. All that we know of him corresponds so exactly to the clinical aspect of paranoia, that it is hardly conceivable how anybody at all acquainted with mental disorders, can entertain the slightest doubt as to the correctness of the diagnosis".

There were, however, also authors who, like Kneib, defended the sanity of Jesus. Both Albert Schweitzer (1913) and Walter E. Bundy (1922) expressed similar views in their books as Kneib: "A pathography of Jesus is possible only upon the basis of a lack of acquaintance with the course and conclusions of New Testament criticism and an amateur application of the principles of the science of psychiatry." However, they as well took no notice of the contributions that Kneib had made to the field. This is despite their similarity in argument and conclusion. Considering the heavy criticism and the disregard of his work, the aim of Kneib to strengthen the believe in Christianity and in the divinity of Jesus with his publication can be seen as failed

Still today the psychic health of Jesus is debated with no definite conclusion and with no significant advance in methodology. On the one hand, the mental health of Jesus is still put into question. In 2012 a team of scientists from Harvard Medical School analysed the biblical figures Abraham, Moses, Jesus, and St. Paul with regards to their mental health. They concluded that "these individuals had experiences that resemble those now defined as psychotic symptoms, suggesting that their experiences may have been manifestations of primary or mood disorder-associated psychotic disorders" On the other hand, there are others who still defend the sanity of Jesus, as for example the psychiatrists Andrew Sims and Pablo Martinez in their book Mad or God? Jesus: The healthiest mind of all (2018). The discussions still evolve around the same topics that had already been dealt with by Kneib and just like in Kneib's arguments, the gospels serve as the main evidence. Thus, the publication made by Kneib had little to no influence on the discussion about the mental health of Jesus and his work is still neglected in the modern debate about the topic.

== See also ==
- Christ myth theory
- Christology
- God complex
- Grandiose delusions
- History of psychiatry
- Hypostatic union
- List of messiah claimants
- Miracles of Jesus
- Psychology of religion
- Retrospective diagnosis
- Sexuality of Jesus
