= Mental health of Jesus =

Retrospective inquiry into the psychological state of Jesus

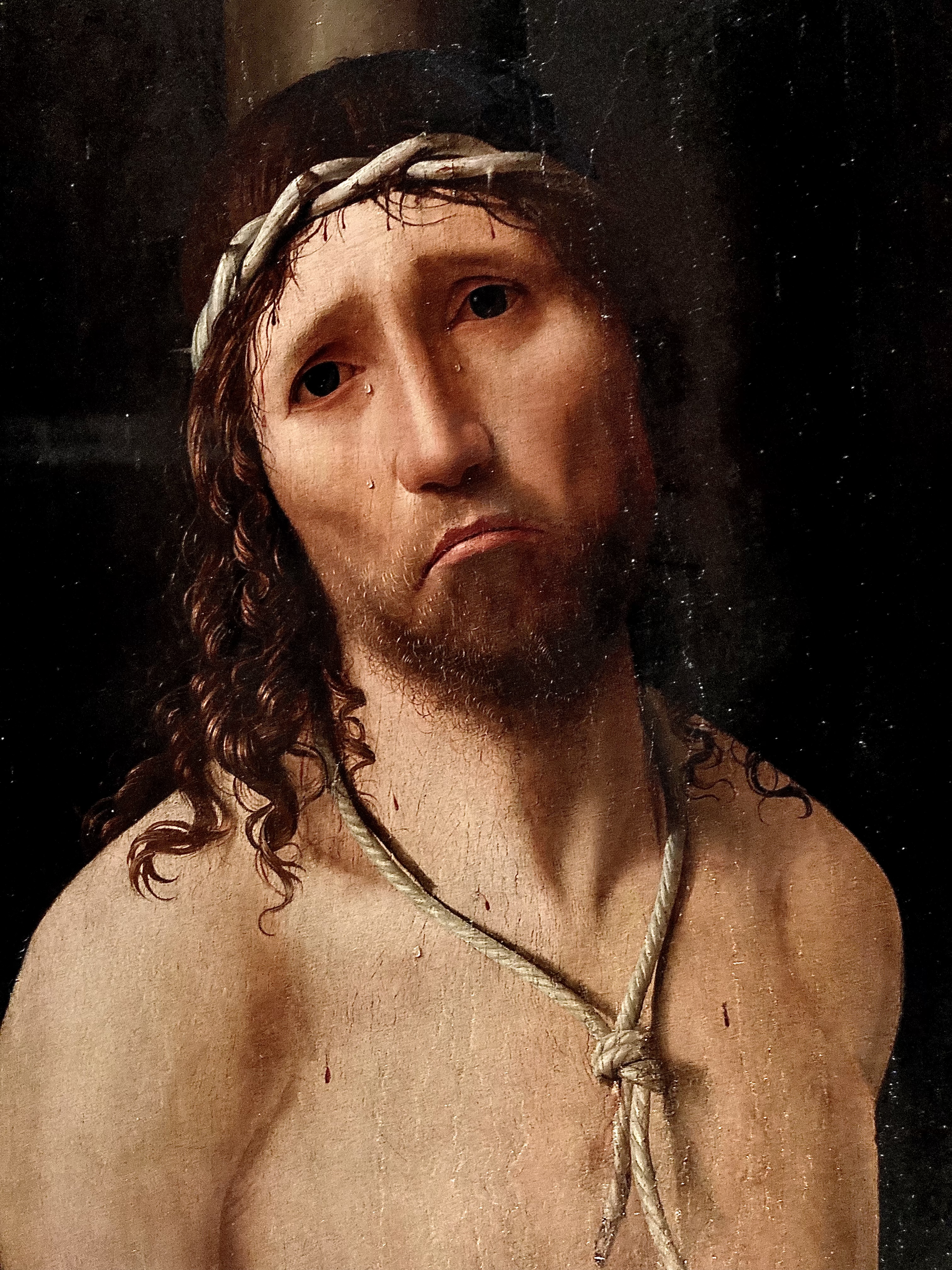
Ecce Homo, by Antonello da Messina, 1473

The question of whether the historical Jesus was in good mental health is a subject of consideration for multiple psychologists, philosophers, historians, and writers. The first person — after several other less comprehensive attempts at tackling the subject — who broadly and thoroughly questioned the mental health of Jesus was French psychologist Charles Binet-Sanglé, the chief physician of Paris and author of a four-volume work La Folie de Jésus (The Madness of Jesus, 1908–1915). This view finds both supporters and opponents.

== Opinions challenging the sanity of Jesus ==
The assessment of the sanity of Jesus first occurs in the gospels. The Gospel of Mark reports the opinion of members of his family who believe that Jesus "is beside himself." Some psychiatrists, religious scholars and writers explain that, according to the gospels, Jesus's family (Mark 3:21), some followers (John 7:20), and contemporaries, at various points in time, regarded him as delusional, possessed by demons, or insane.

And when his family heard it, they went out to seize him, for people were saying, "He is beside himself". And the scribes who came down from Jerusalem said, "He is possessed by Be-el′zebul, and by the prince of demons he casts out the demons".

— Mark 3:21–22, RSV

The accusation contained in the Gospel of John is more literal:

There was again a division among the Jews because of these words. Many of them said, "He has a demon, and he is mad; why listen to him?" Others said, "These are not the sayings of one who has a demon. Can a demon open the eyes of the blind?"

— John 10:19–21, RSV

Justin Meggitt, a lecturer at the University of Cambridge, suggests in his article "The Madness of King Jesus: Why was Jesus Put to Death, but his Followers were not?" (2007) and in his book The Madness of King Jesus (2010) that Pilate and other Romans regarded Jesus as an insane lunatic. According to the Gospels, Jesus was presented to Pilate and sentenced to death as a royal pretender, but the standard Roman procedure was the prosecution and execution of would-be insurgents with their leaders. Therefore, to suggest that Jesus was put to death by the Roman authorities as some kind of royal pretender does not explain sufficiently why he was executed, but his disciples were not. Jean Meslier (1664–1729) had similar thoughts in the 18th century. In chapters 33 and 34 of his Testament, he argues that Jesus "was really a madman, a fanatic" (était véritablement un fou, un insensé, un fanatique).

Challenging the sanity of Jesus continued in the 19th century with the first quest for the historical Jesus. David Strauss (Das Leben Jesu, 1864) claimed that Jesus was a fanatic. Lemuel K. Washburn opined in a pamphlet Was Jesus insane? (1889) that "Jesus was not divine, but insane". Oskar Panizza introduced Jesus as a psychopathological and paranoid case. Oskar Holtzmann in War Jesus Ekstatiker? (1903) presented Jesus as "ecstatic", which he described as a pathologically-strong excitability of the imagination and the power of will. Henry Leffmann claimed in 1904 that Jesus was a megalomaniac with episodes of frenzy and auditory delusions. German psychiatrist Georg Lomer (as George de Loosten, 1905) attempted to retrospectively diagnose Jesus as generally mentally ill, similarly to Jean Meslier. Danish psychiatrist Emil Rasmussen (1905) determined Jesus to be either epileptic or paranoid. Using a few examples, he developed a description of the typical pathological prophet ("Prophetentypus") and applied it to Jesus. Julius Baumann (1908) hypothesised that the abnormalities he found in Jesus' behaviour could be explained by a nerve overstimulation (Nervenüberreizung). However, Charles Binet-Sanglé, in his four-volume work La folie de Jésus, published between 1908 and 1915, extensively, coherently, and thoughtfully questions the sanity of Jesus. Binet-Sanglé diagnosed Jesus as suffering from religious paranoia:

In short, the nature of the hallucinations of Jesus, as they are described in the orthodox Gospels, permits us to conclude that the founder of Christian religion was afflicted with religious paranoia.

— (vol. 2, p. 393)

His view was shared by the New York psychiatrist and neurologist William Hirsch, who in 1912 published his study, Religion and Civilization: The Conclusions of a Psychiatrist, which enumerated a number of Jesus' mentally-aberrant behaviours. Hirsch agreed with Binet-Sanglé in that Jesus had been afflicted with hallucinations and pointed to his "megalomania, which mounted ceaselessly and immeasurably". Hirsch concluded that Jesus was just a "paranoid":

But Christ offers in every respect an absolutely typical picture of a wellknown mental disease. All that we know of him corresponds so exactly to the clinical aspect of paranoia, that it is hardly conceivable how anybody at all acquainted with mental disorders, can entertain the slightest doubt as to the correctness of the diagnosis.

— (p. 103)

Hirsch claims that Jesus, as a typical paranoid, applied prophecies about the coming of the messiah to himself, and had a deep hatred towards anyone who disagreed with him on everything. The Soviet psychiatrist Y. V. Mints (1927) also diagnosed Jesus as suffering from paranoia. The literature of the Soviet Union in the 1920s, following the tradition of the demythologization of Jesus in the works of Strauss, Renan, Nietzsche, and Binet-Sanglé, put forward two main themes: mental illness and deception. That was reflected in Mikhail Bulgakov's novel The Master and Margarita in which Jesus is depicted by Pontius Pilate as a harmless madman. It was only at the turn of the 1920s and the 1930s that the mythological option, the denial of the existence of Jesus, won the upper hand in Soviet propaganda. Jesus' mental health was also questioned by the British psychiatrists William Sargant and Raj Persaud, and a number of psychologists of the psychoanalytic orientation, like Georges Berguer in his study Quelques traits de la vie de Jésus au point de vue psychologique et psychanalytique (1920).

Władysław Witwicki, a rationalist philosopher and psychologist, in the comments to his own translation of the Gospels of Matthew and Mark, Dobra Nowina według Mateusza i Marka (The Good News according to Matthew and Mark), which is in fact a psychobiography of Jesus, attributed that Jesus had subjectivism, an increased sense of his own power and superiority over others, egocentrism and the tendency to subjugate other people. He also had difficulties communicating with the outside world, as well as dissociative identity disorder, which made him a schizothymic or even schizophrenic type (according to Ernst Kretschmer's typology).

American philosopher and science skeptic Paul Kurtz, in one of his most influential writings, The Transcendental Temptation (1986, chapter Was Jesus disturbed?), notices that some passages in the gospels suggest that "Jesus was a disturbed personality." However, he notes, "It is difficult to be certain, since we have no way of submitting him to intensive psychiatric diagnosis." He states that if Jesus had any claim to divinity, "then he was deranged." According to Kurtz, Jesus "kept preaching that doomsday or the last days were at hand." In this context, he cites Matthew 16:28 and 24:34–35. He also quotes passages in the gospels in which Jesus' family (Mark 3:20–21) and other contemporary Jews (Mark 3:22, John 10:20) accused him of demonic possession and insanity.

The American theologian and psychologist of religion Donald Capps, in his book Jesus: A Psychological Biography (1989, 2000), diagnosed Jesus as a utopian-melancholic person due to his presumed illegitimacy and lack of adoption by Joseph. According to him, due to a deep sense of personal desecration and rejection, baptism in the Jordan was for Jesus an act of "fictive adoption" by God, and then he could not wait for the coming of the kingdom of God. The author suggests that Jesus' suicidal tendencies and his entry into a situation leading to execution are part of the psychological pattern of suicidal behavior among melancholic people.

New Testament scholar Andrew Jacob Mattill Jr., in his essay contained in The Book Your Church Doesn't Want You To Read (1993), draws attention to the ever-increasing megalomania of "John's Jesus" (described in the Gospel of John 6:29, 35, 38, 40, 47–58; 7:38; 8:12; 11:25–26; 14:6, 13–14), and concludes:

The more trust one puts in the Fourth Gospel's portrait of Jesus the more difficult it is to defend the sanity of Jesus.

The English psychiatrist Anthony Storr in his final book Feet of Clay; Saints, Sinners, and Madmen: A Study of Gurus (1996) suggested that there are psychological similarities between crazy "messiahs" such as Jim Jones and David Koresh and respected religious leaders including Jesus. (Note: As does neuroendocrinology researcher Robert Sapolsky.) Storr tracks typical patterns, often involving psychotic disorders that shape the development of the guru. His study is an attempt to look at Jesus as one of many gurus. Storr agrees with most scholars of historical Jesus, who are inclined to the hypothesis of Jesus as apocalyptic prophet:

It seems inescapable that Jesus did share the apocalyptic view that God's final conquest of evil was at hand and that God's kingdom would be established upon earth in the near future.

Storr recognises Jesus' many similarities to other gurus, for example, going through a period of internal conflict during his fasting in the desert. According to Storr, if Jesus really considered himself a deputy for God and believed that one day he would come down from heaven to rule, he was very similar to the gurus whom he had previously described as preachers of delusions possessed by mania of greatness. He notes that Jesus was not ideal in family life (Mark 3:31–35, Mark 13:12–13). Gurus often remain indifferent to family ties. Other similarities, according to Storr, include Jesus' faith in receiving a special revelation from God and a tendency to elitism, in the sense that Jesus believed that he had been specially marked by God.

American neuroendocrinology researcher Robert Sapolsky in his essay included in the book The Trouble with Testosterone: and Other Essays on the Biology of the Human Predicament (1997, 1998) suggests the occurrence of schizotypal ("half-crazy", p. 248) behavior and metamagical thinking in shamans, Jesus and other charismatic religious leaders:

Oh, sure, one can overdo it, and our history is darkly stained with abortive religious movements inspired by messianic crackpots. (...) However, if you get the metamagical thoughts and behaviors to the right extent and at the right time and place, then people might just get the day off from work on your birthday for a long time to come.

— (p. 256)

Then Sapolsky notes that "plausible links can be made among schizotypal behaviour, metamagical thought, and the founding of certain religious beliefs in both non-Western and Western societies." (p. 256) According to him: "The notion of the psychopathology of the shaman works just as readily in understanding the roots of major Western religions as well." (p. 255)

In 2012, a team of psychiatrists, behavioral psychologists, neurologists and neuropsychiatrists from the Harvard Medical School published a research that suggested the development of a new diagnostic category of psychiatric disorders related to religious delusion and hyperreligiosity. They compared the thoughts and behaviors of the most important figures in the Bible, such as Abraham, Moses, Jesus, and Paul, with patients affected by mental disorders related to the psychotic spectrum using different clusters of disorders and diagnostic criteria (DSM-IV-TR), and concluded that these Biblical figures "may have had psychotic symptoms that contributed inspiration for their revelations", such as schizophrenia, schizoaffective disorder, bipolar disorder, delusional disorder, delusions of grandeur, auditory-visual hallucinations, paranoia, Geschwind syndrome (especially Paul), and abnormal experiences associated with temporal lobe epilepsy (TLE). According to the authors, in the case of Jesus, it could have been: paranoid schizophrenia, bipolar and schizoaffective disorders. They hypothesized that Jesus may have sought death through "suicide-by-proxy" (indirect suicide). (Note: Justin Meggitt refers to John 8:21–22.)

== Opinions defending the sanity of Jesus ==
Opinions and publications questioning the sanity of Jesus, especially Georg Lomer, Charles Binet-Sanglé and William Hirsch, caused polemical reactions. They were first challenged by Albert Schweitzer in his doctoral thesis, The Psychiatric Study of Jesus: Exposition and Criticism (Die psychiatrische Beurteilung Jesu: Darstellung und Kritik, 1913), defending the sanity of Jesus. Schweitzer was accused of his theological opinions supporting tendencies to portray Jesus as mentally ill or a religious fanatic. In his dissertation, he sought to refute these accusations. He advocated transdisciplinary approaches to retrospective pathographies of historical figures. He accused the authors of pathographies of Jesus of ignorance regarding the historical aspect of the subject. According to Schweitzer, they misunderstand the late Jewish worldview when explaining the world of Jesus' ideas, and are also unable to distinguish historical from ahistorical statements in the source materials. The author concludes at the end of the dissertation that the only psychiatric features that could possibly be considered historical and about which one could discuss – Jesus' high opinion of himself and possible hallucinations during baptism – are not sufficient evidence for the existence of a mental illness.

The opinions of Jesus' pathographers were also challenged by American theologian Walter E. Bundy in his 1922 book, The psychic health of Jesus. Bundy summarized his defense of Jesus' sanity:

A pathography of Jesus is possible only upon the basis of a lack of acquaintance with the course and conclusions of New Testament criticism and an amateur application of the principles of the science of psychiatry.

— (p. 268)

Earlier the mental health of Jesus was defended by: the German Catholic theologian, professor of apologetics at the University of Würzburg, Philipp Kneib (Moderne Leben-Jesu-Forschung unter dem Einflusse der Psychiatrie, 1908) – against the arguments of Holtzmann, Lomer, Rasmussen and Baumann; the German evangelical theologian and pastor Hermann Werner (Die psychische Gesundheit Jesu, 1908) – against the arguments of Holtzmann, Lomer and Rasmussen; and also by the German psychiatrist, chief physician of the Friedrichsberg Mental Asylum in Hamburg, Heinrich Schaefer (Jesus in psychiatrischer Beleuchtung: eine Kontroverse, 1910) – against the arguments of Lomer and Rasmussen.

The mental health of Jesus is defended by Christian psychiatrists Olivier Quentin Hyder, Pablo Martinez, and Andrew Sims. Christian apologists, such as Josh McDowell and Lee Strobel, also take up the subject of Jesus' sanity defense. The defense of Jesus' mental health was devoted to an editorial in the magazine of Italian Jesuits La Civiltà Cattolica, published November 5, 1994. To the title question E se Gesù si fosse ingannato? ("What if Jesus had deceived himself?") the editors replied in the negative by arguing that Jesus was not a fanatic or megalomaniac but a mentally-healthy and very realistic person. Therefore, he did not deceive himself by saying that he was the messiah and the Son of God.

American biblical scholar James H. Charlesworth, in his essay Jesus Research and the Appearance of Psychobiography (2002), discusses previous attempts to write a psychobiography of Jesus. In the final reflection, he suggests that earlier (created at the beginning of the 20th century) images of a mentally disturbed, paranoid Jesus with hallucinations resulted from comparing him to paranoids in the clinics of their creators and applying Freudian psychology to ancient sources. According to the author, Jesus' intentions should be examined in the context of his place and era, using historical research.

Pope Benedict XVI wrote in his book Jesus of Nazareth: From the Baptism in the Jordan to the Transfiguration (2007):

A broad current of liberal scholarship has interpreted Jesus' Baptism as a vocational experience. After having led a perfectly normal life in the province of Galilee, at the moment of his Baptism he is said to have had an earth-shattering experience. It was then, we are told, that he became aware of his special relationship to God and his religious mission. This mission, moreover, supposedly originated from the expectation motif then dominant in Israel, creatively reshaped by John, and from the emotional upheaval that the event of his Baptism brought about in Jesus′ life. But none of this can be found in the texts. However much scholarly erudition goes into the presentation of this reading, it has to be seen as more akin to a "Jesus novel" than as an actual interpretation of the texts. The texts give us no window into Jesus' inner life – Jesus stands above our psychologizing. (Guardini, Das Wesen des Christentums).

American philosopher and Christian minister Robin Meyers devotes the first chapter of his book The Underground Church: Reclaiming the Subversive Way of Jesus (2012) to defending the mental health of Jesus. According to him, "many of those who questioned the mental health of Jesus did it to render claims about him suspect and thus dismiss the gospel as nonsense" (p. 28). Further (p. 32) the author quotes Thomas Merton in reaction: "The whole concept of sanity in a society where spiritual values have lost their meaning is itself meaningless."

C. S. Lewis famously considered Jesus' mental health in what is known as Lewis's trilemma (the formulation quoted here is by John Duncan):

Christ either deceived mankind by conscious fraud, or He was Himself deluded and self-deceived, or He was Divine. There is no getting out of this trilemma. It is inexorable.

The agnostic atheist New Testament scholar Bart Ehrman wrote on his own blog:

And he may well have thought (I think he did think) that he would be made the messiah in the future kingdom. That may have been a rather exalted view of himself, but I don't think it makes Jesus crazy. It makes him an unusually confident apocalyptic prophet. There were others with visions of grandeur at the time. I don't think that makes him mentally ill. It makes him a first-century apocalyptic Jew.

== See also ==
- Criticism of Jesus
- Divine madness
- Foolishness for Christ
- God complex
- Jerusalem syndrome
- List of messiah claimants
- Messiah complex
- Psychology of religion
- Rejection of Jesus
- Religion and schizophrenia
- Sexuality and marital status of Jesus
- The Three Christs of Ypsilanti (Milton Rokeach psychiatric case study)
