= Andrew Sims =

Andrew Sims may refer to:

- Sims (rapper), real name Andrew Sims, member of the indie hip hop collective Doomtree
- Andrew Sims (psychiatrist), British psychiatrist
