= Baâlons =

- Commune
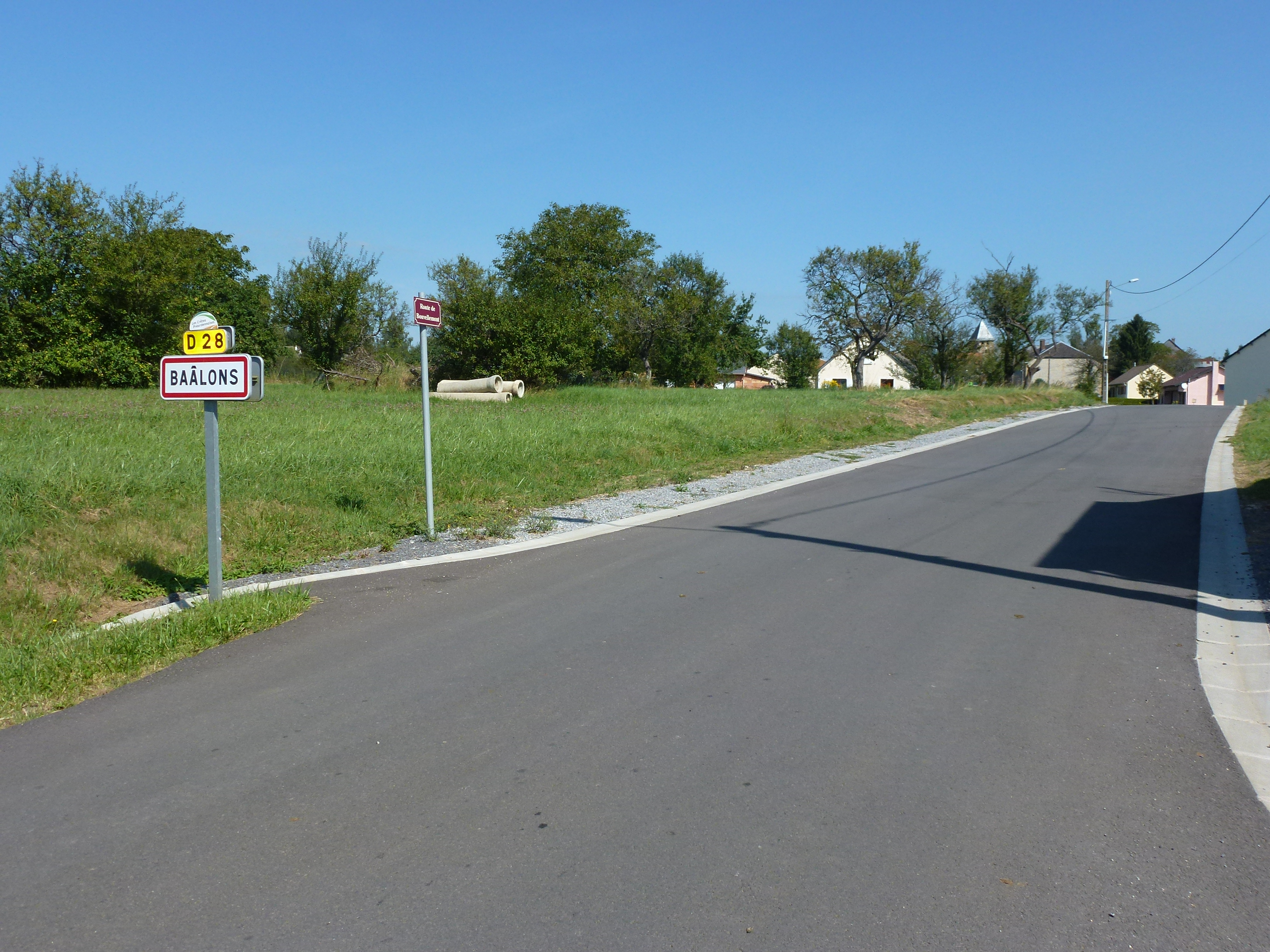
- The road into Baâlons

- Coat of arms
- Location of Baâlons
- Location within France Location within Grand Est
- Coordinates: 49°35′42″N 4°40′16″E
- Country: France
- Region: Grand Est
- Department: Ardennes
- Arrondissement: Charleville-Mézières
- Canton: Nouvion-sur-Meuse
- Intercommunality: Crêtes Préardennaises

Government
  - Mayor (2024–2026): Régis Chopin
- Area^{1}: 14.72 km^{2} (5.68 sq mi)
- Elevation: 220 m (720 ft)
- Population (2023): 210
  - Density: 14/km^{2} (37/sq mi)
- Time zone: UTC+01:00 (CET)
  - Summer (DST): UTC+02:00 (CEST)
- INSEE/Postal code: 08041 /08430
- ^{1} French Land Register data, which excludes lakes, ponds, glaciers > 1 km^{2} (0.386 sq mi or 247 acres) and river estuaries.

Baâlons (French pronunciation: [balɔ̃]) is a commune in the Ardennes department in the Grand Est region of northern France.

== Geography ==
Baâlons is located some 25 km north-east of Rethel and 18 km south of Charleville-Mézières. Access to the commune is by the D28 road from Bouvellemont in the south which passes through the village and continues north-east then north to join the D27. The D991 also goes north from Bouvellemont passing through the west of the commune to join the D951 north of Mazerny. The commune is mixed forest and farmland with particularly large forests in the east.

The Ruisseau du Fond Cahors rises west of the village and flows west to join the Ruisseau de la Fontaine aux Chênes. The Ruisseau des Puiselets forms the western border of the commune as it flows south to join the Ruisseau du Fond Cahors. The Ruisseau de Baâlons rises in the north of the commune and flows south towards the village then turns east to join the Ruisseau de Bairon on the eastern border. The Ruisseau de Bairon forms the eastern border of the commune as it flows south to join the Étang de Bairon which feeds into the Canal des Ardennes west of Tannay.

=== Hamlets and localities in the commune ===
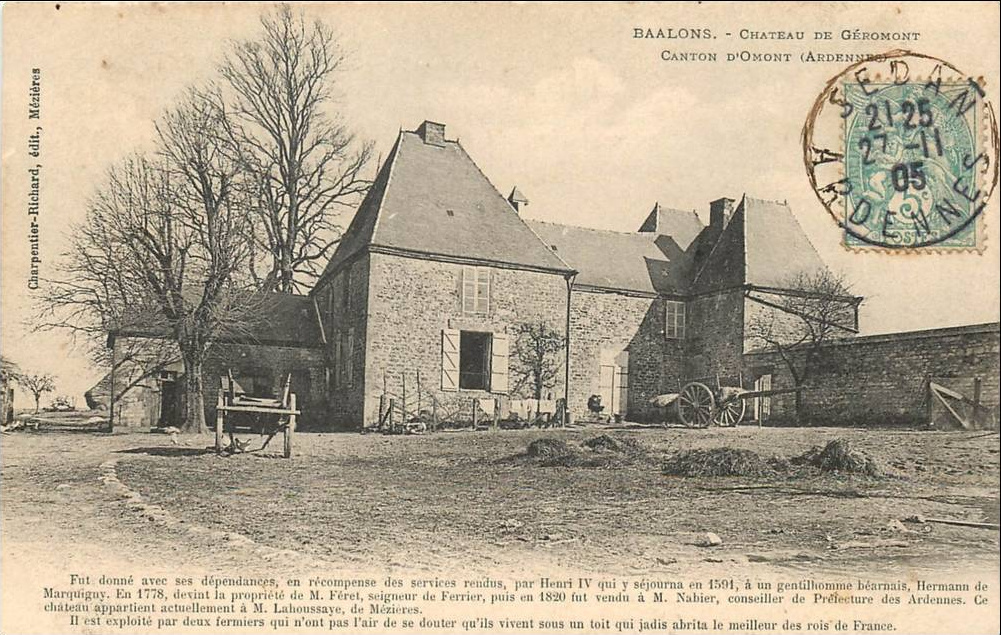
Géraumont in 1905

Géraumont

Géraumont was a former fief where there is still a castle, now Géromont Farm.

Les Puiselets

A small hamlet west of Baâlons village. It is now very sparsely populated however the General Dictionary of cities towns, villages, hamlets and farms of France by Duclos says that in 1846 there were 70 inhabitants.

Beauvois

A Hamlet in the north of the commune which is still populated.

== History ==
Various objects have been found in the commune:

- Tools and shards of flint which are probably Neolithic
- Gallo-Roman Bronze Statuettes of Mars and Jupiter
- A Merovingian and Carolingian Cemetery

The Universal Dictionary of Ancient and Modern France and New France by Marin Saugrain stated in 1726 that:

"BAALON in Champagne, Diocese of Reims, Parliament of Paris, Intendance of Chalons, Election of Rhetel, has 419 inhabitants. The Curate is worth nine hundred livres.".

=== Heraldry ===
Arms of Baâlons	Blazon: Parti per pale: 1 Or a lion Sable, 2 Argent with 3 fesses Sable; the whole in chief Gules charged with 3 mullets Or.

== Administration ==
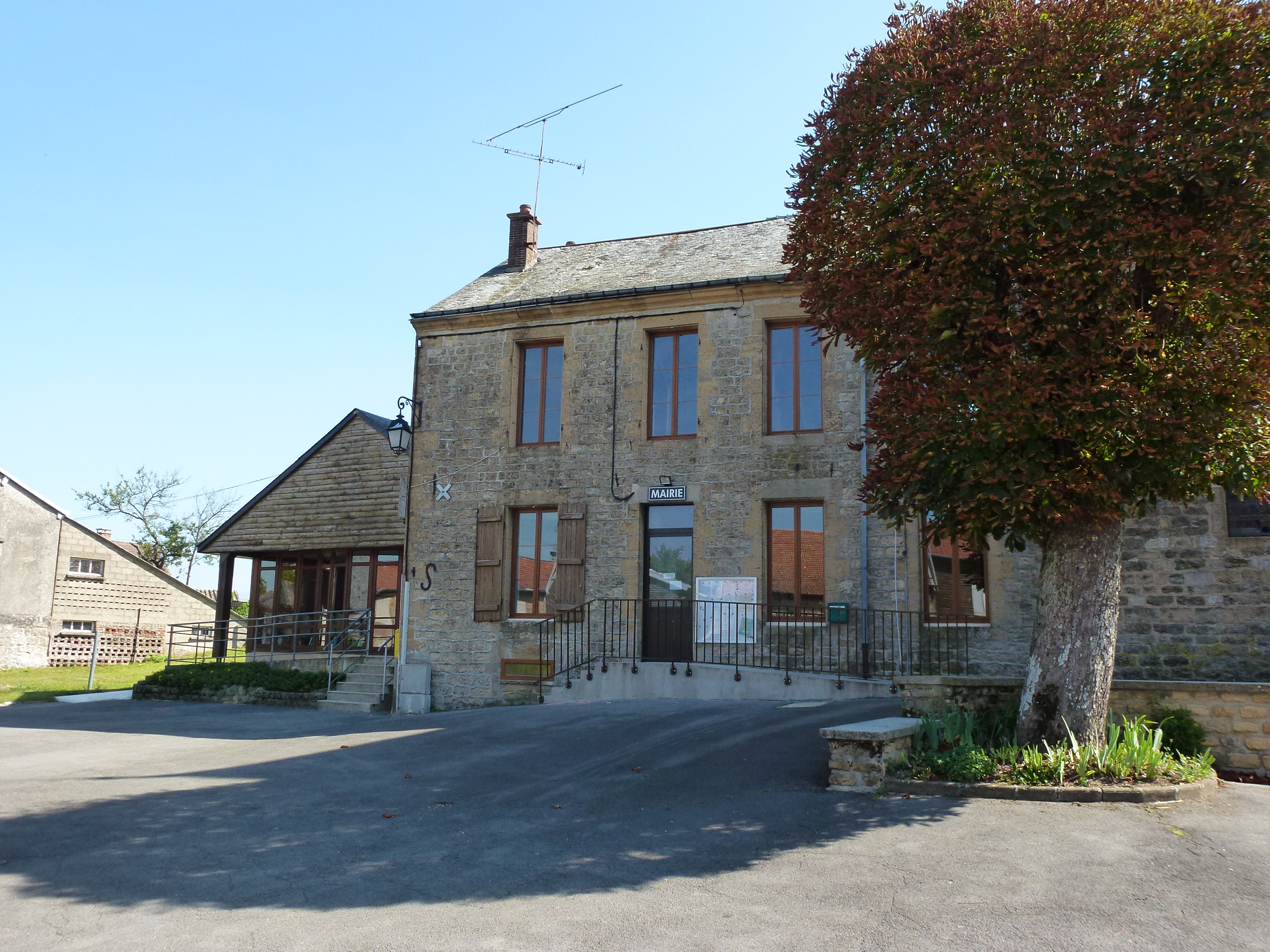
The Town Hall

List of Successive Mayors

From	To	Name
2001	2008	Ludovic Dasnois
2008	2012	Henri Charpentier
2012	2020	Pascal Nihotte
2020	2024	Raoul Charbonneaux
2024	Current	Régis Chopin

== Population ==
The inhabitants of the commune are known as Baâlonnais or Baâlonnaises in French.

Historical population

Year	Pop.	±% p.a.
1793	660	—
1821	902	+1.12%
1846	907	+0.02%
1872	633	−1.37%
1901	377	−1.77%
1926	288	−1.07%
1946	251	−0.69%
1962	173	−2.30%
1968	169	−0.39%

Year	Pop.	±% p.a.
1975	163	−0.52%
1982	147	−1.47%
1990	160	+1.06%
1999	170	+0.68%
2007	199	+1.99%
2012	235	+3.38%
2017	207	−2.51%
2023	210	+0.24%

Source: EHESS and INSEE

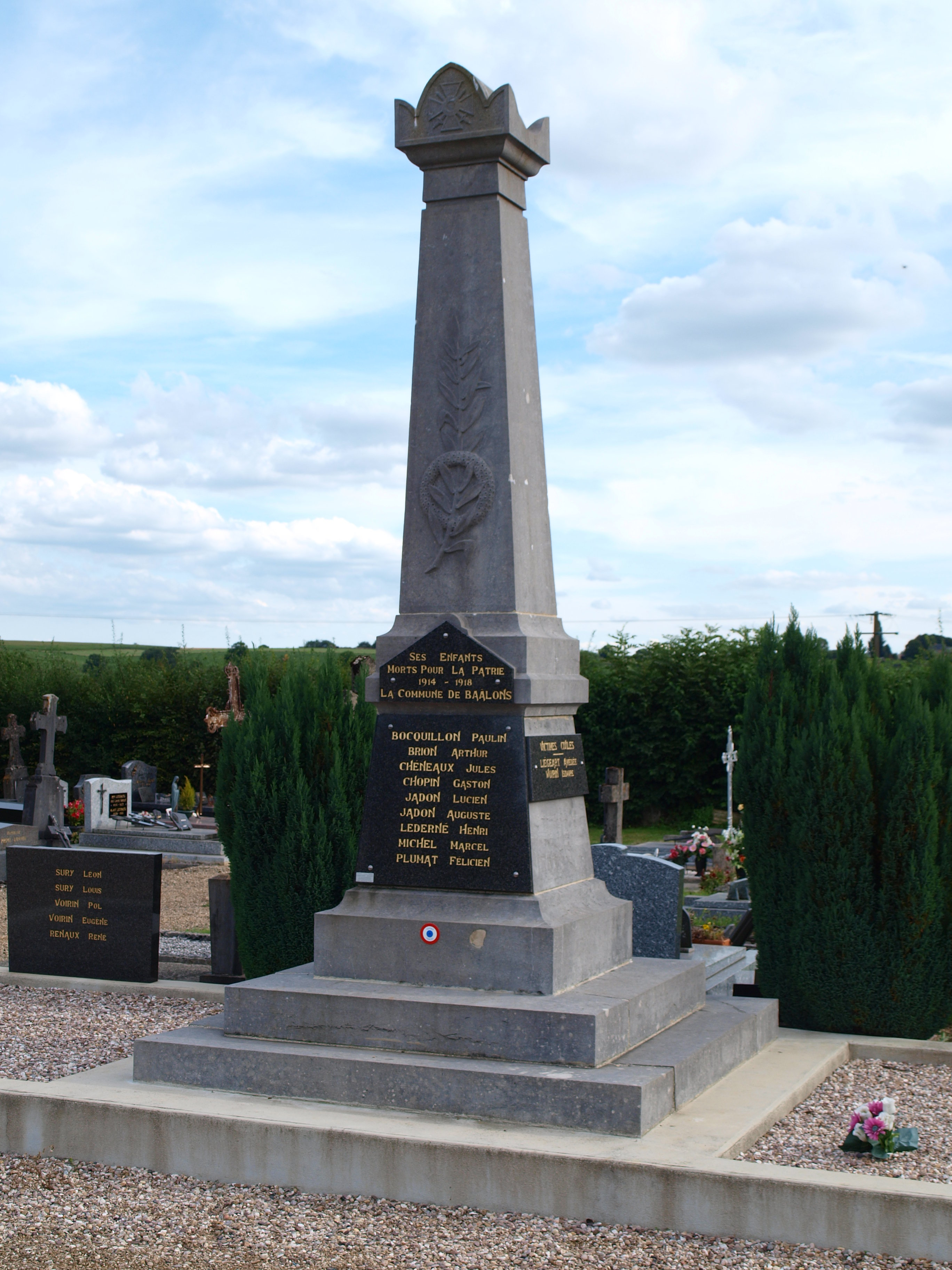
The War Memorial

== Sites and Monuments ==
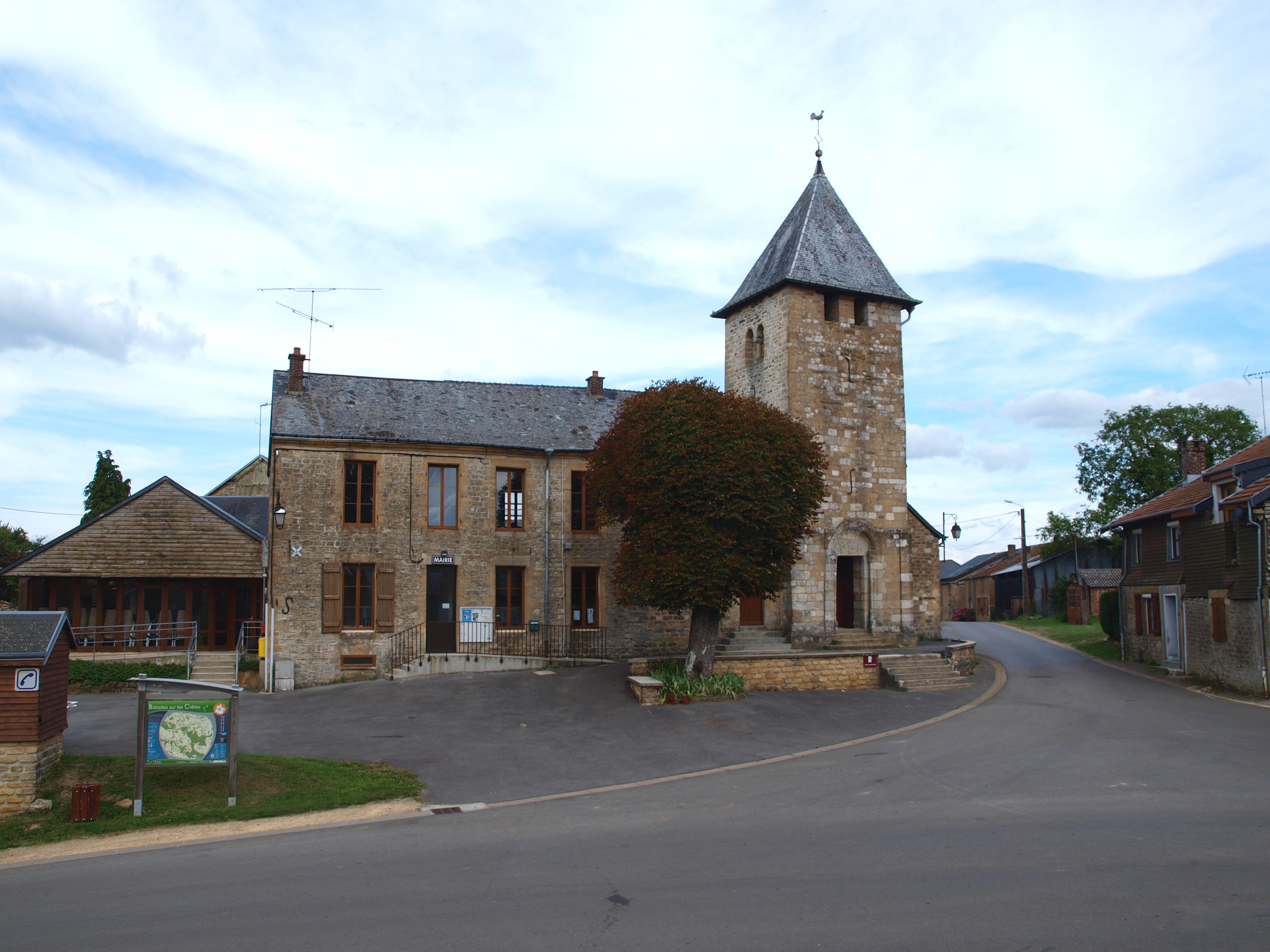
The Church of Saint-Rémi and the Town Hall

- The Church of Saint-Rémi is a church dating to the 13th century in the late Romanesque style with a tympanum over the door from the 10th century representing a man with a crosier and an open book flanked by two angels. The church contains two items which are registered as historical objects:
  - A Group Sculpture: Saint Nicolas (17th century)
  - A Statue: Virgin and child (14th century)
- The Chapel of Saint Anne was built in 1911 on the site of a chapel dating from 1807 near the Saint Anne spring which was a place of pilgrimage. The Procession of Saint Anne is held on 26 July of each year.

Church and Chapel Picture Gallery

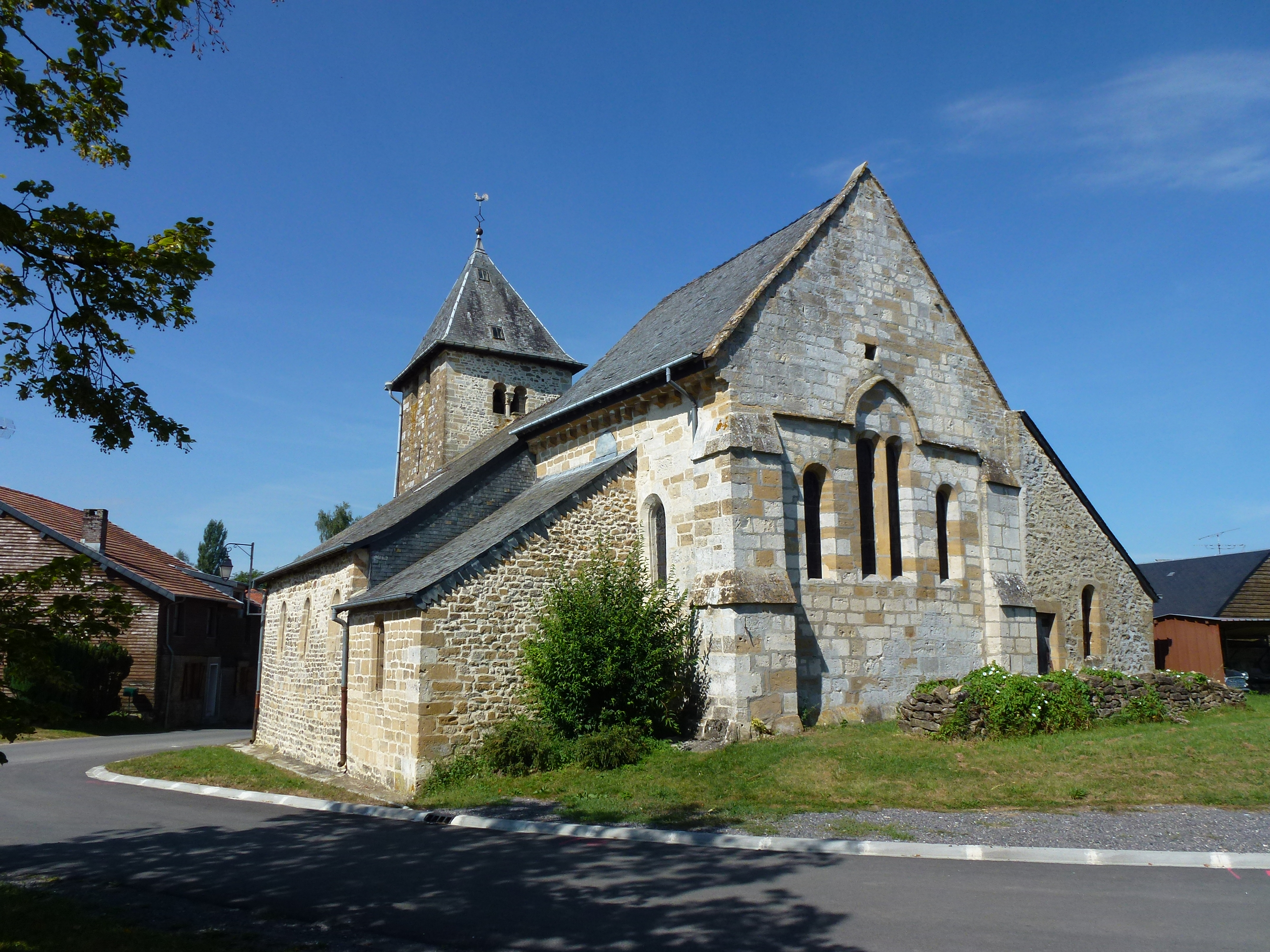
The Church of Saint-Rémi

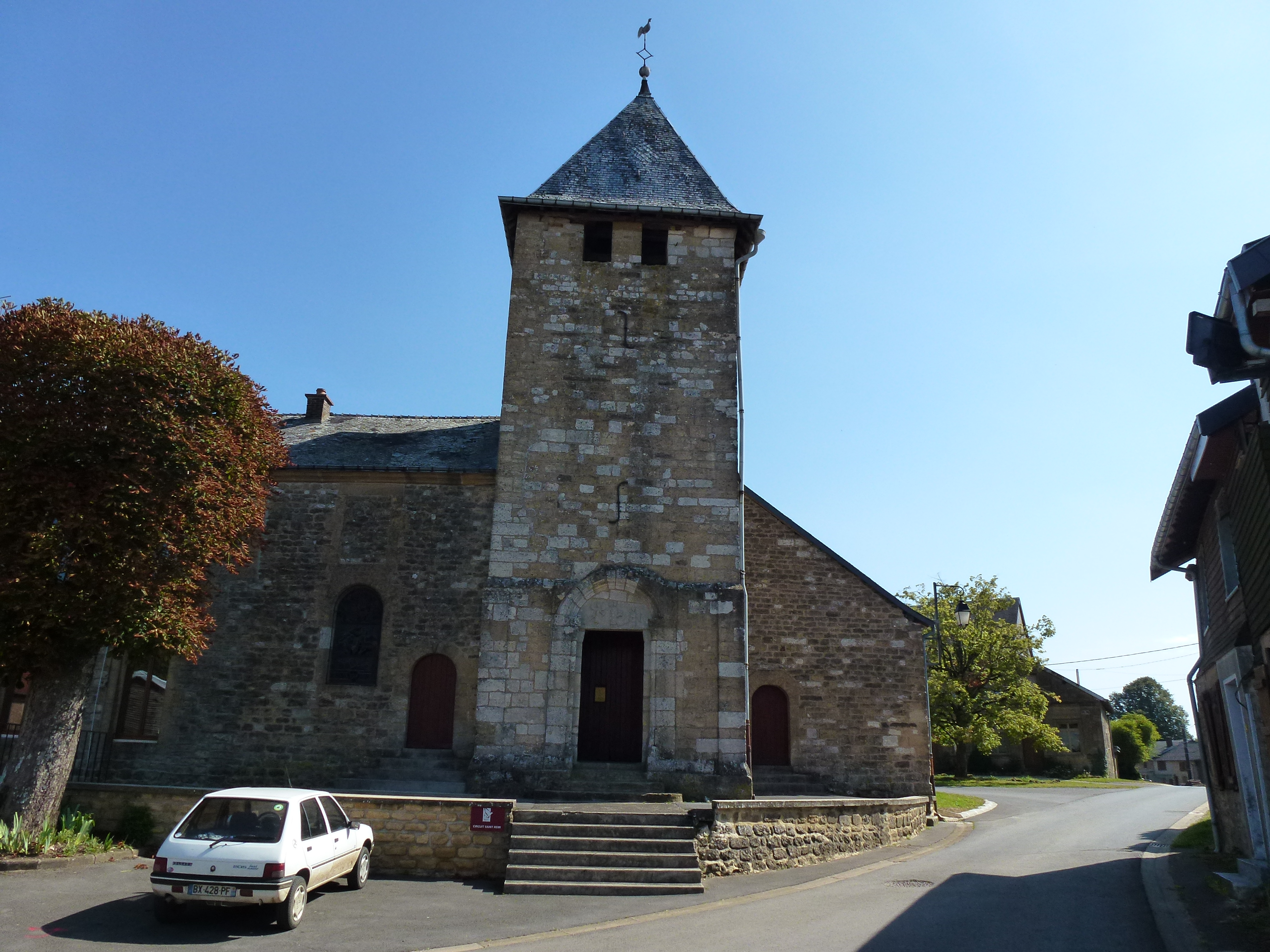
The facade of the Church

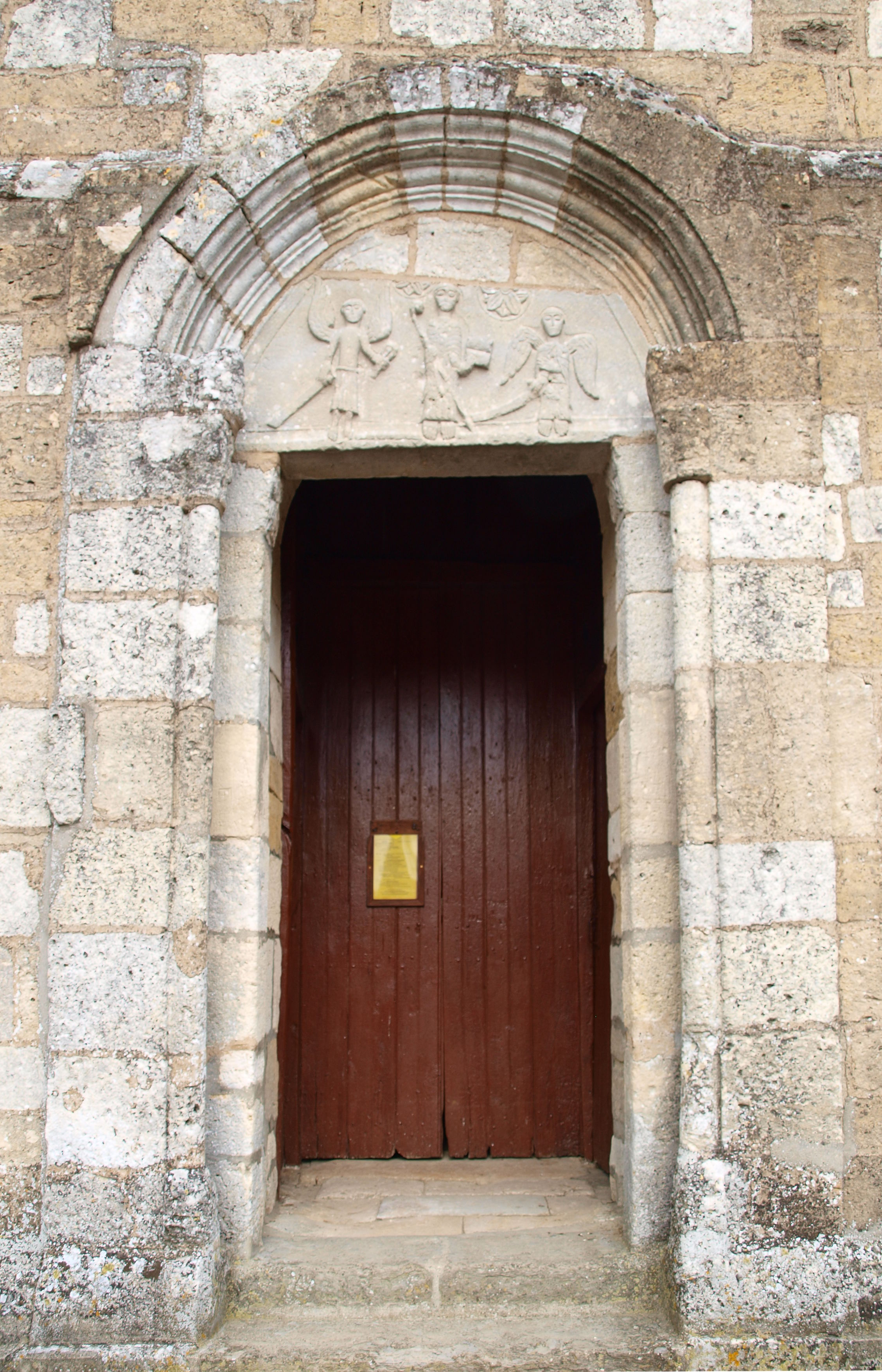
The door to the Church

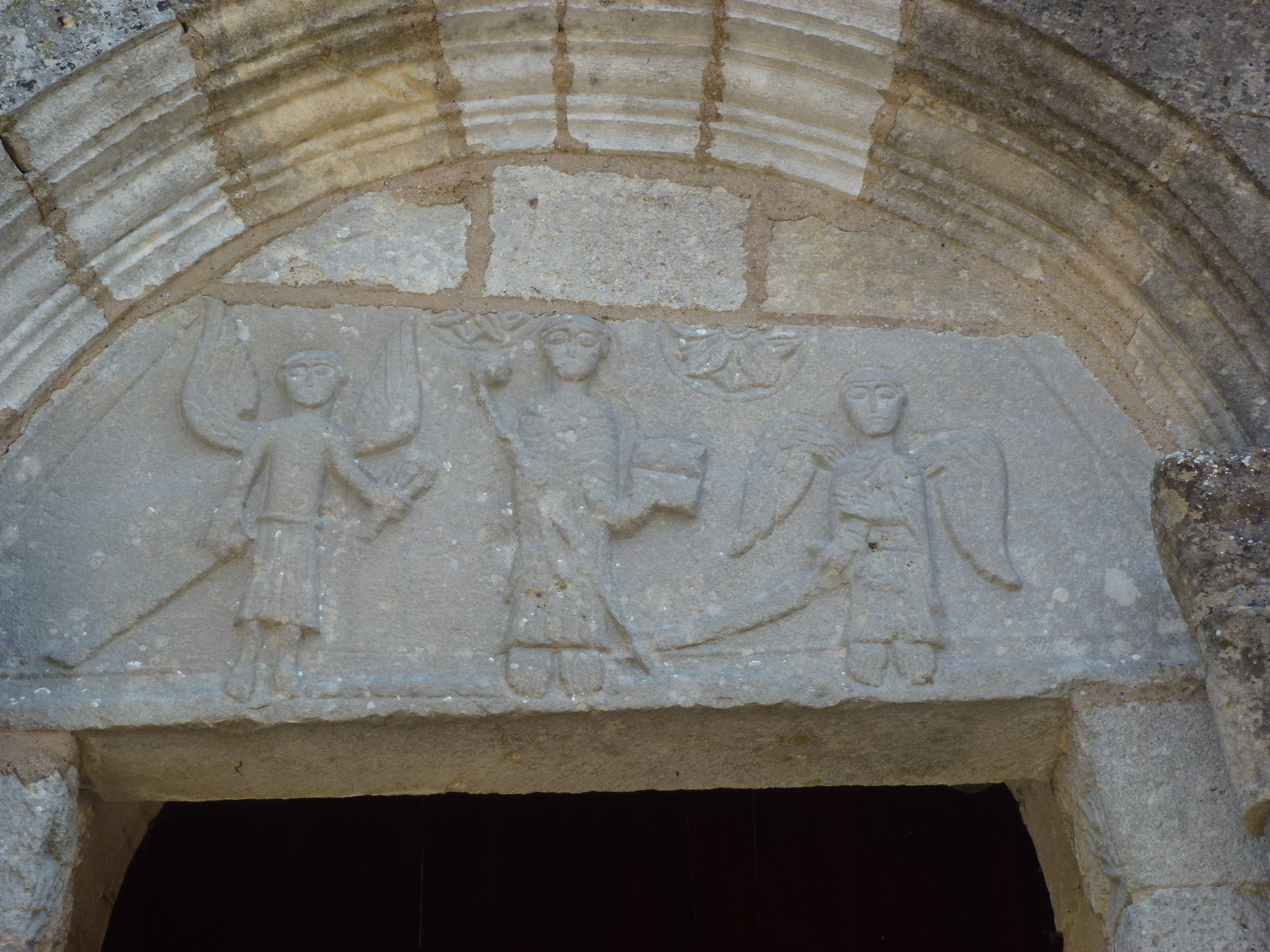
The Tympanum

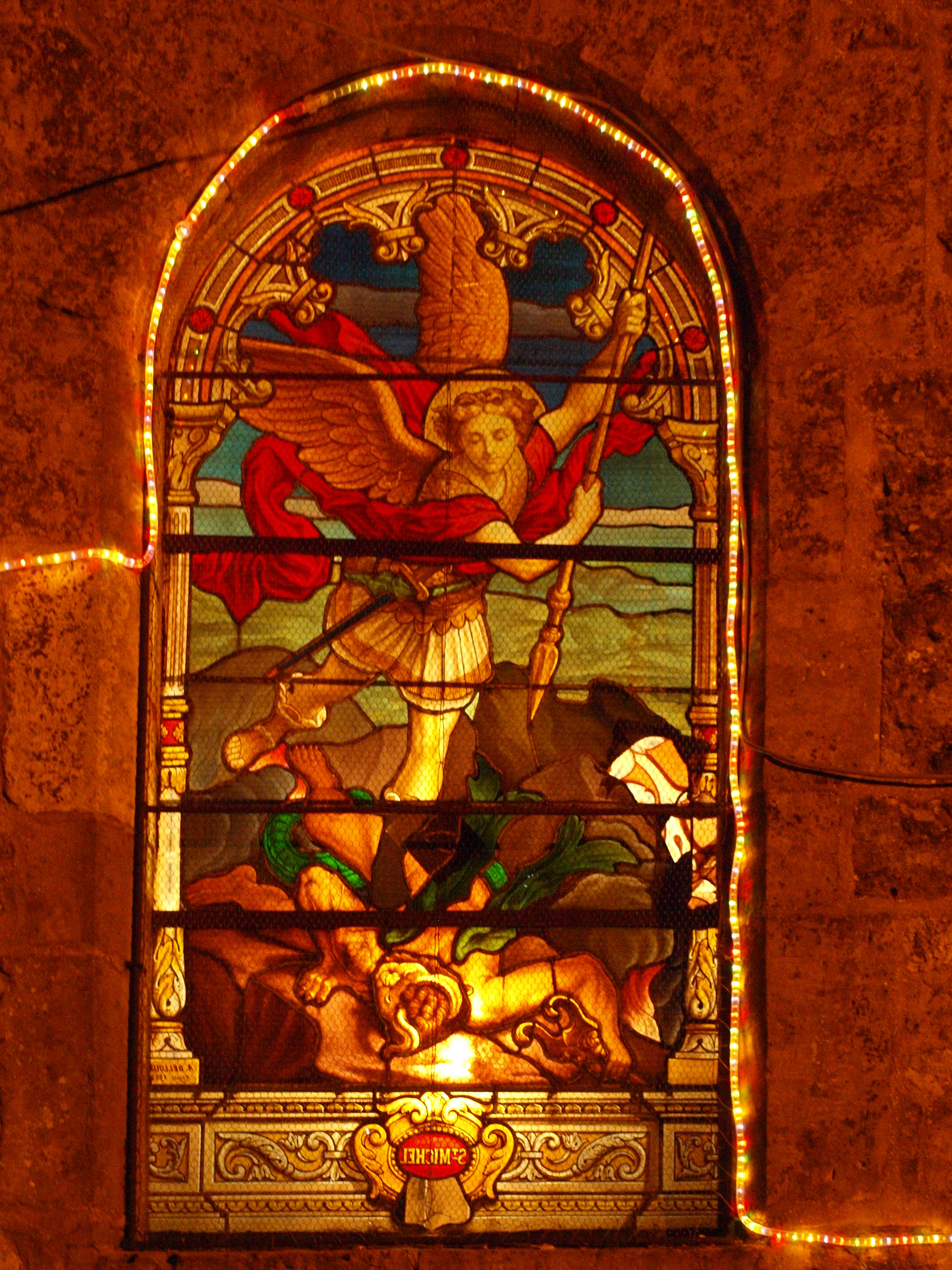
Stained glass in the Church

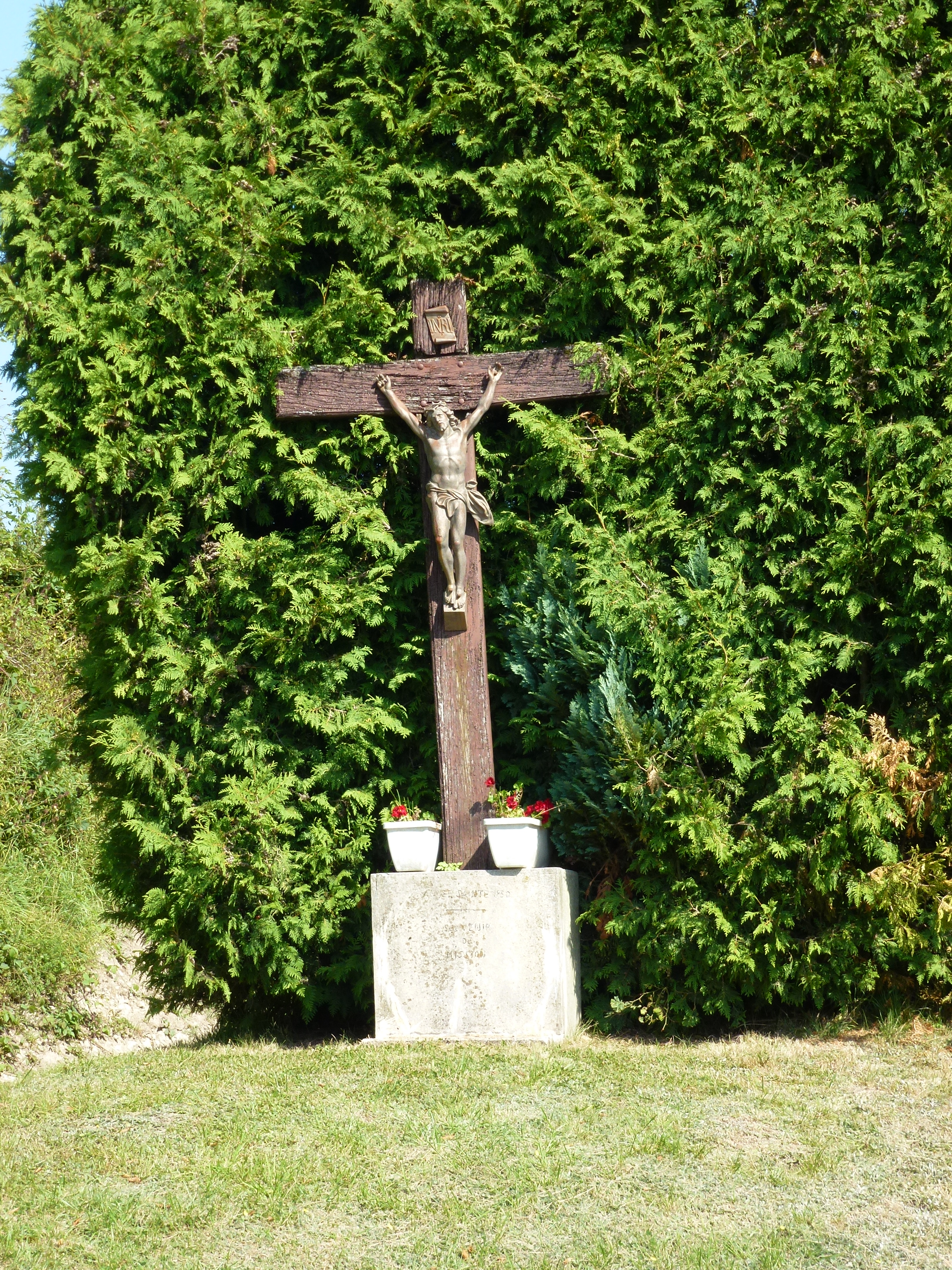
A Wayside Cross

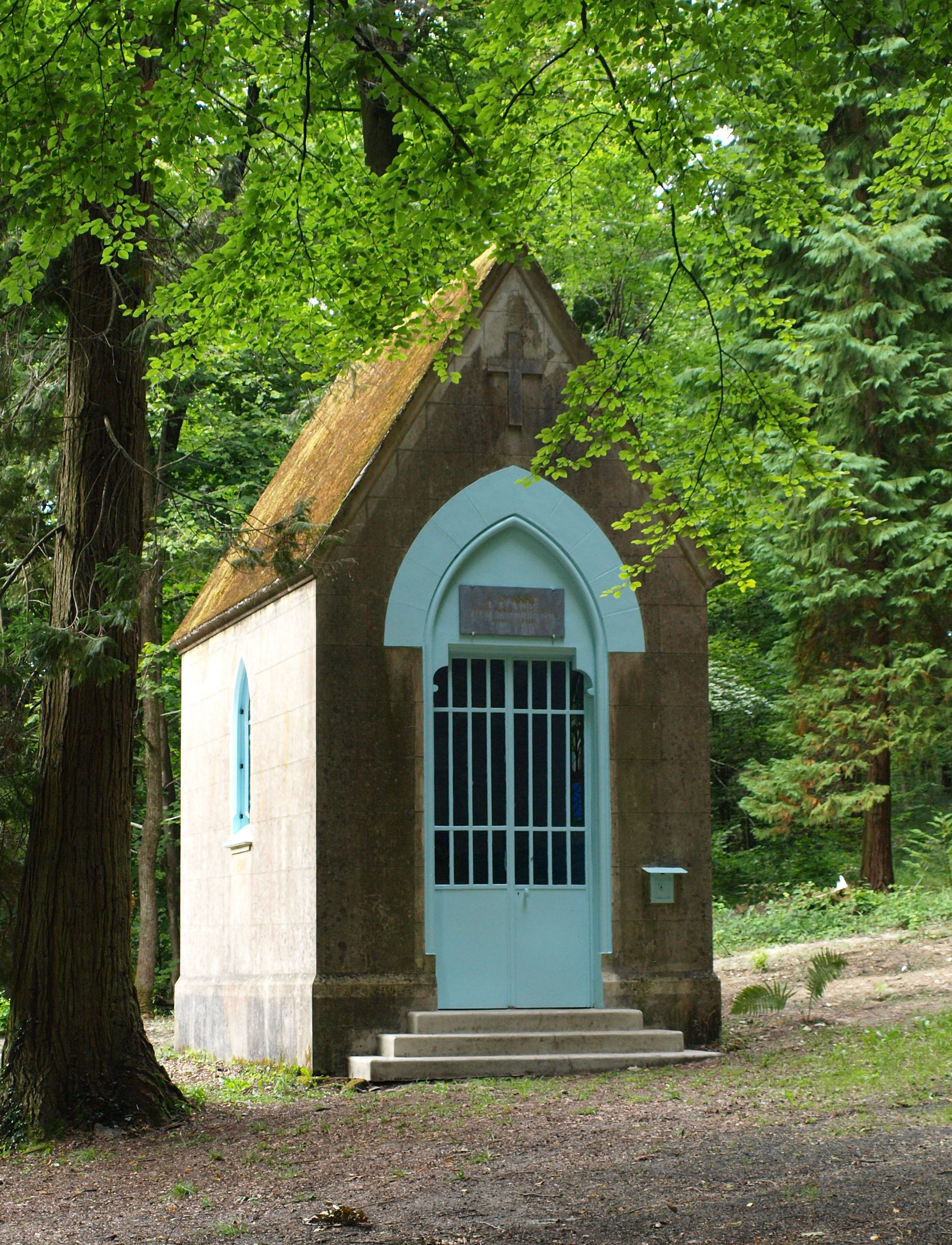
The chapel of Saint Anne

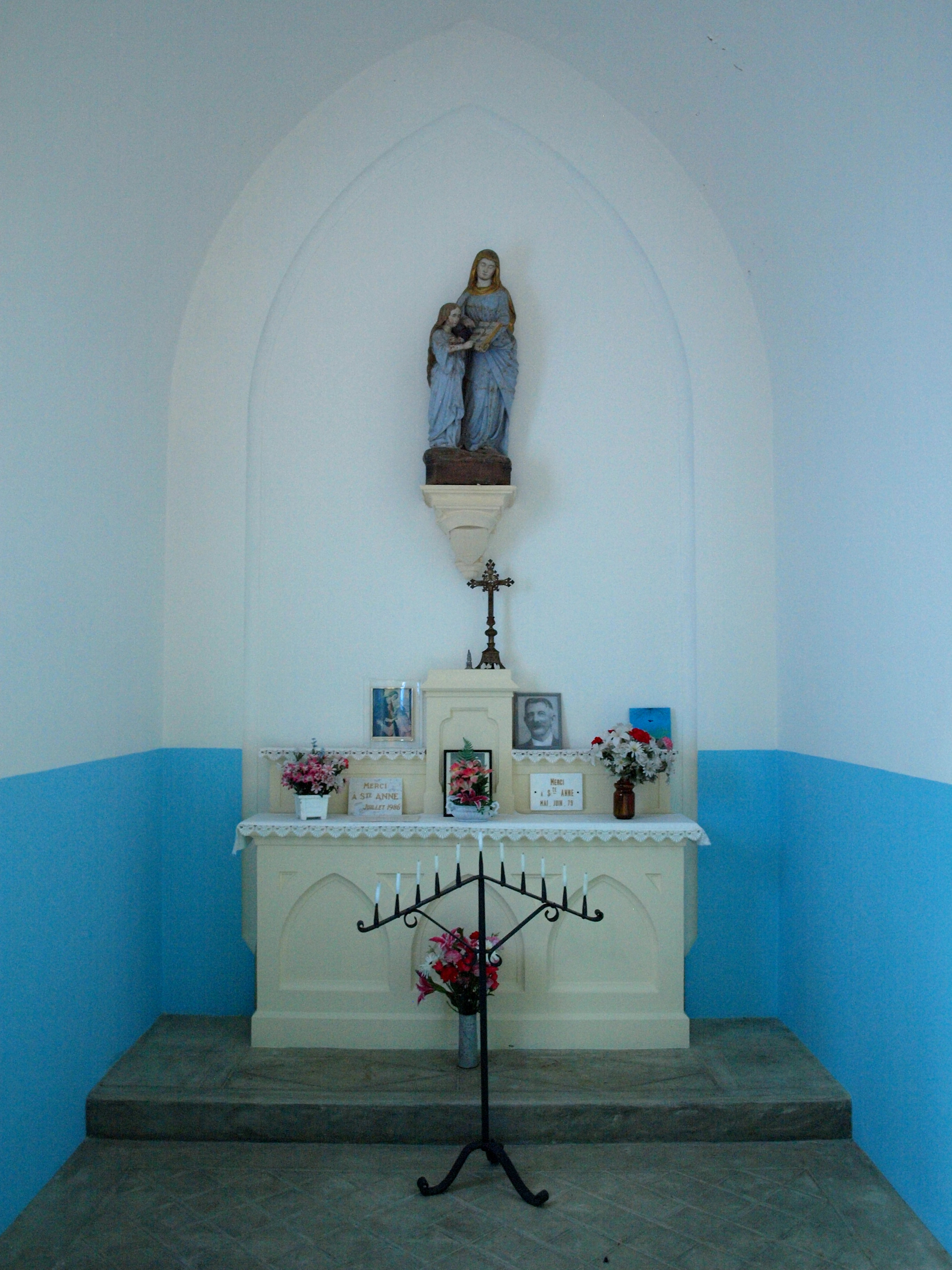
The Altar in the Chapel

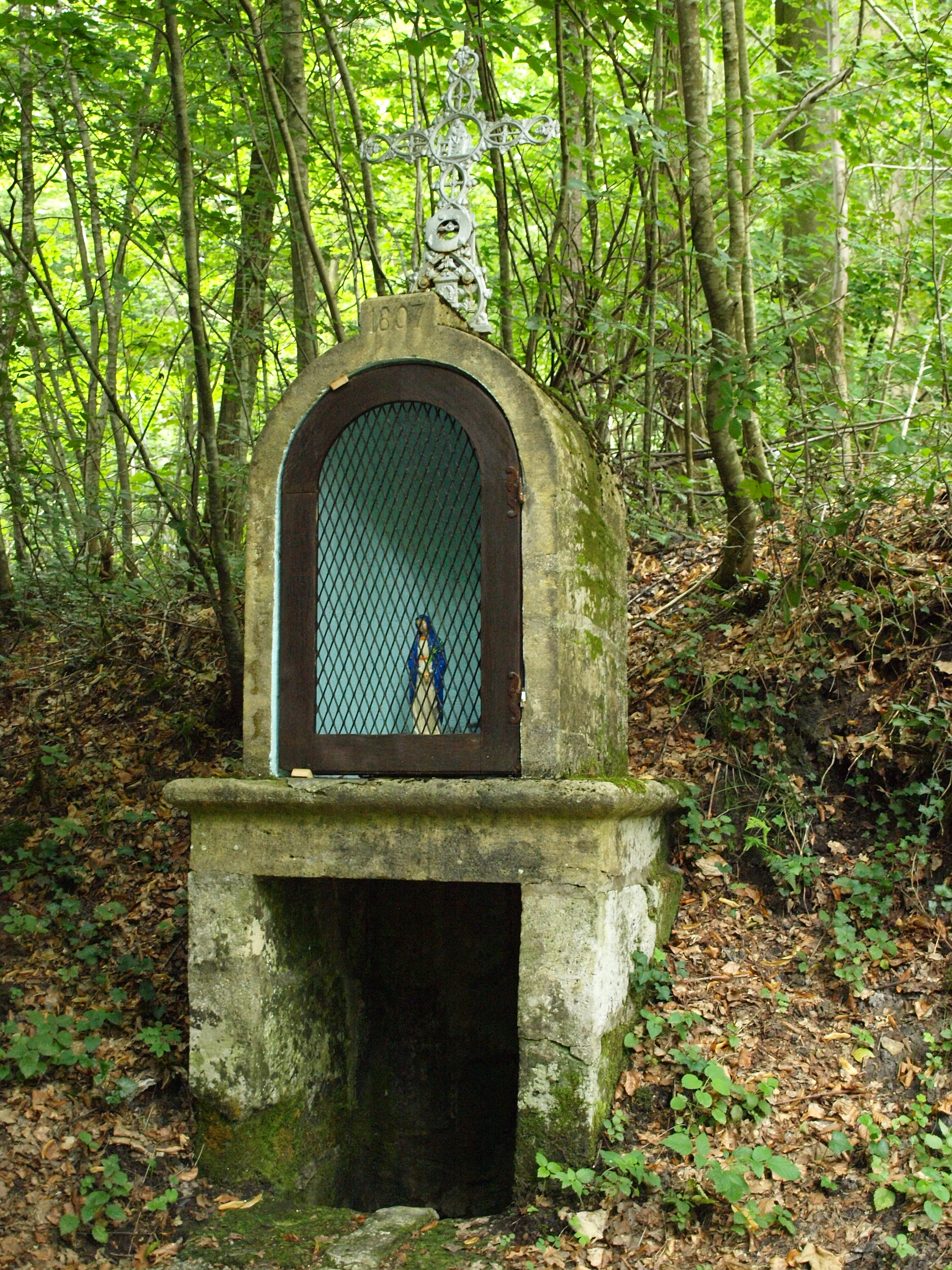
An Oratory at the Chapel of Saint Anne

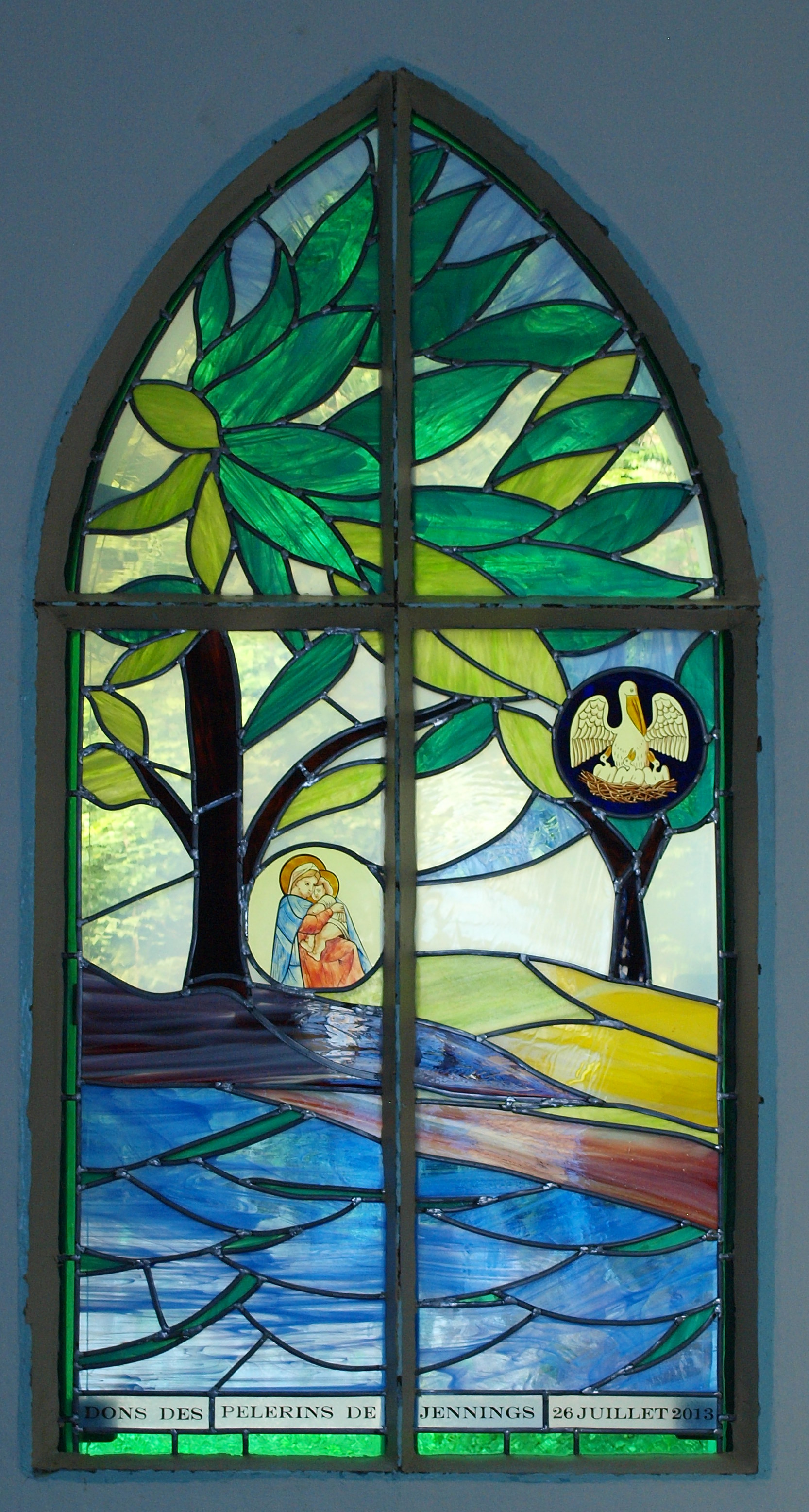
Strained glass in the Chapel

== Notable people linked to the commune ==
- Eugène Houssière, emigrated to Louisiana USA in 1883, donated the Chapel of Saint Anne in 1911.

== See also ==
- Communes of the Ardennes department
