= Carl Siegfried =

German theologian (1830–1903)

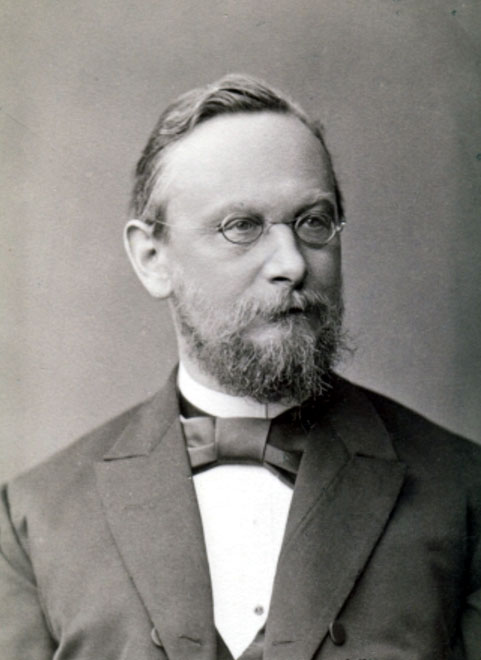
Carl Gustav Adolf Siegfried (c. 1880)

Carl Gustav Adolf Siegfried (22 January 1830, Magdeburg – 9 January 1903, Jena) was a German theologian who specialized in Old Testament studies.

He studied theology and philology at the universities of Halle and Bonn. In 1859, he received his doctorate from Halle, and afterwards worked as a teacher at the cathedral gymnasium in Magdeburg and at the regional school in Pforta. In 1875, he was appointed professor of Old Testament theology at the University of Jena.

== Selected works ==
- Spinoza als Kritiker und Ausleger des Alten Testaments, 1867 – Spinoza as a critic and interpreter of the Old Testament.
- Philo von Alexandria als Ausleger des Alten Testaments. 1875 – Philo of Alexandria as an interpreter of the Old Testament.
- Lehrbuch der neuhebräischen Sprache und Litteratur. 1884 (with Hermann Leberecht Strack) – Textbook of modern Hebrew language and literature.
- Briefwechsel zwischen Goethe und V. Diez, (as editor) In: Goethe-Jahrbuch 1, 1890, S. 24–41 – Correspondence between Goethe and Heinrich Friedrich von Diez.
- "The book of Job. Critical edition of the Hebrew text", Leipzig, J.C. Hinrichs; Baltimore, Johns Hopkins Press, 1893. (notes by Siegfried, English translation of the notes by Rudolf Ernst Brünnow).
- Hebräisches Wörterbuch zum Alten Testament, 1893 (with Bernhard Stade) – Hebrew dictionary of the Old Testament.
- Kommentare: Prediger und Hoheslied. 1898 – Commentary on Ecclesiastes and the Song of Solomon.
- Esra, Nehemia, Esther. 1901 – Ezra, Nehemiah, Esther.

Siegfried was the author of many articles in the Allgemeine Deutsche Biographie.
