= Bernhard Stade =

Bernhard Stade (May 1848, Arnstadt, Thuringia – 6 December 1906) was a German Protestant theologian and historian.

== Biography ==
He studied at Leipzig and Berlin, and in course of time became (1875) professor ordinarius at Giessen. Once a member of Franz Delitzsch's class, he became a convinced adherent of the newest critical school. In 1881 he founded the Zeitschrift für die alttestamentliche Wissenschaft, which he continued to edit; and his critical history of Israel (Geschichte des Volks Israel, 2 vols., 1887–1888; vol. ii in conjunction with Oskar Holtzmann) made him very widely known.

With Carl Siegfried, he revised and edited the Hebrew lexicon, Hebräisches Wörterbuch zum Alten Testament (1892–1893). Stade's other works included:

- Über die alttestamentlichen Vorstellungen vom Zustand nach dem Tode (1877).
- Lehrbuch der hebräischen Grammatik (vol. i, 1879).
- Ausgewählte akademische Reden und Abhandlungen (1899).
- Biblische Theologie des Alten Testaments (1905, etc.).
