= Jean Meslier =

French Catholic priest (1664–1729)

The Reverend Jean Meslier
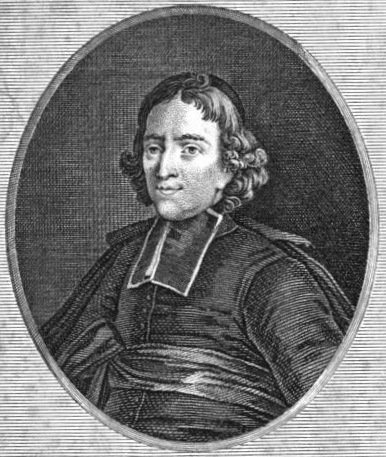
- Church: Catholic Church

Personal details
- Born: 15 June 1664 Mazerny, Champagne, France
- Died: 17 June 1729 (aged 65) Étrépigny, Champagne, France
- Denomination: Catholic

Jean Meslier (French: [melje]; also Mellier; 15 June 1664 - 17 June 1729 was a French Catholic priest (abbé) who was discovered, upon his death, to have written a book-length philosophical essay promoting atheism and materialism. Described by the author as his "testament" to his parishioners, the text criticises and denounces all religions.

== Life ==
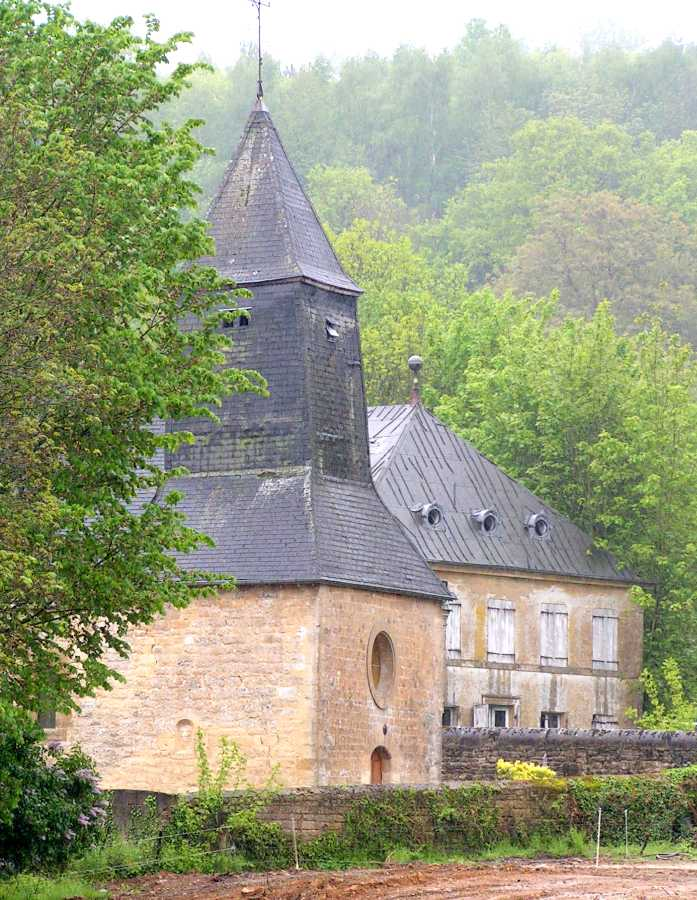
Church of Étrépigny, the parish church where Meslier preached.

Jean Meslier was born in Mazerny in the Ardennes to Gérard Meslier and Symphorienne Braidy, who both worked in the textile manufacturing industry. He began learning Latin from a neighbourhood priest in 1678 and eventually joined the seminary; he later claimed, in the Author's Preface to his Testament, this was done to please his parents. At the end of his studies, he took Holy orders and, on 7 January 1689, became priest at Étrépigny.

Aside from one public disagreement with local nobleman Antoine de Touilly over the lord's treatment of the peasantry, Meslier was to all appearances generally unremarkable. However, he was twice reproved by clerical authorities for inappropriately employing young adult servant women, with whom the atheist and Meslier biographer Michel Onfray suggests he was sexually involved. "Discreetly and secretly, the curé had to practice the joy of free love advocated in his work," writes Onfray. He was also reprimanded by his archbishop for accusing the local lord of robbing the poor in a sermon. Meslier claimed to have lived like a pauper and to have donated every spare penny to the poor.

When Meslier died in Étrépigny, there were found in his house three copies of a 633-page octavo manuscript in which the village curate denounces organised religion as "but a castle in the air" and theology as "but ignorance of natural causes reduced to a system".

== Testament text ==
In his Testament, Meslier repudiated not only the God of conventional Christianity, but even the generic God of the natural religion of the deists. For Meslier, the existence of evil was incompatible with the idea of a good and wise God. He denied that any spiritual value could be gained from suffering, and he used the deist's argument from design against God, by showing the evils that he had permitted in this world. To him, religions were fabrications fostered by the ruling elite; while the earliest Christians had been exemplary in sharing their goods, Christianity had long since degenerated into encouraging the acceptance of suffering and submission to tyranny as practised by the kings of France: injustice was explained away as being the will of an all-wise Being. None of the arguments used by Meslier against the existence of God were original. In fact, he derived them from books written by orthodox theologians in the debate between the Jesuits, Cartesians, and Jansenists. Their inability to agree on a proof for God's existence was taken by Meslier as a good reason not to presume that there were compelling grounds for belief in God.

Meslier's philosophy was that of an atheist. He also denied the existence of the soul and dismissed the notion of free will. In Chapter V, the priest writes, "If God is incomprehensible to man, it would seem rational never to think of Him at all". Meslier later describes God as "a chimera" and argues that the supposition of God is not prerequisite to morality. In fact, he concludes that "Whether there exists a God or not ... men's moral duties will always be the same so long as they possess their own nature". In chapters XXXIII and XXXIV, Meslier challenged Jesus' mental health by implying that Jesus "was really a madman, a fanatic" (étoit véritablement un fou, un insensé, un fanatique).

Meslier wrote that kings and religion were the root cause of the suffering of the common people. In his most famous quote, Meslier refers to a man who "wished that all the great men in the world and all the nobility could be hanged, and strangled with the guts of the priests." Meslier admits that the statement may seem crude and shocking, but comments that this is what the priests and nobility deserve, not for reasons of revenge or hatred, but for love of justice and truth. Equally well-known is the version by Diderot, in the poem Les Éleuthéromanes: "And [with] the guts of the last priest let's strangle the neck of the last king" ("Et des boyaux du dernier prêtre serrons le cou du dernier roi". During the political unrest of May 1968, the radical students of the Sorbonne Occupation Committee paraphrased Meslier's epigram, stating that "humanity won’t be happy till the last capitalist is hung with the guts of the last bureaucrat."

Meslier also vehemently attacked social injustice and sketched out a kind of rural proto-communism. All the people in a region would belong to a commune in which wealth would be held in common, and everybody would work. Founded on love and brotherhood, the communes would ally to help each other and preserve peace. An opponent of cruelty to animals, Meslier wrote that "it is an act of cruelty, of barbarism, to kill, to strike unconscious, and to cut the throat of animals, who do no harm to anyone, the way we do." He considered the lack of compassion and concern by Christians for animal suffering at the hands of man to be, according to Matthieu Ricard, further proof of "the nonexistence, or the malice, of their God."

=== Voltaire's Extrait ===
Various edited abstracts (known as "extraits") of the Testament were printed and circulated, condensing the multi-volume original manuscript and sometimes adding material that was not written by Meslier. Abstracts were popular because of the length and convoluted style of the original. Voltaire often mentions Meslier (referring to him as "a good priest") in his correspondence, in which he tells his daughter to "read and read again" Meslier's only work, and says that "every honest man should have Meslier's Testament in his pocket." He also described Meslier as writing "in the style of a carriage-horse". Voltaire published his own expurgated version as Extraits des sentiments de Jean Meslier (first edition, 1762). Voltaire's edition changed the thrust of Meslier's arguments, or drew on other Extraits which did this, (Note: See Wade (1933) for a discussion of the different versions and Extraits of the manuscript of the Testament) so that he appeared to be a deist—like Voltaire—rather than an atheist.

The following passage is found at the end of Voltaire's Extrait, and has been cited in support of the view that Meslier was not really an atheist; (Note: See for example: McGrath, Alister (2004). p. 24) however, the passage does not appear in either the 1864 complete edition of the Testament, published in Amsterdam by Rudolf Charles, (Note: see also Wade (1933), p. 387, especially pp. 393–94) or in the complete works of Meslier published 1970–1972.

I will finish by begging God, so outraged by that sect, to deign to recall us to natural religion, of which Christianity is the declared enemy. To that simple religion that God placed in the hearts of all men, which teaches us that we only do unto others what we want to have done unto us. Then the universe will be composed of good citizens, of just fathers, of submissive children, of tender friends. God gave us this religion in giving us reason. May fanaticism no longer pervert it! I die more filled with these wishes than with hopes. This is the exact summary of the in-folio testament of Jean Meslier. We can judge how weighty is the testimony of a dying priest who asks God's forgiveness.

Another book, Good Sense (French: Le Bon Sens), published anonymously in 1772, was long attributed to Meslier, but was in fact written by Baron d'Holbach. The complete Testament of Meslier was published in English translation (by Michael Shreve) for the first time in 2009.

== Legacy ==
In his book In Defense of Atheism (2007), the atheist philosopher Michel Onfray describes Meslier as the first person to write an entire text in support of atheism. He writes:

For the first time (but how long will it take us to acknowledge this?) in the history of ideas, a philosopher had dedicated a whole book to the question of atheism. He professed it, demonstrated it, arguing and quoting, sharing his reading and his reflections, and seeking confirmation from his own observations of the everyday world. His title sets it out clearly: Memoir of the Thoughts and Feelings of Jean Meslier; and so does his subtitle: Clear and Evident Demonstrations of the Vanity and Falsity of All the Religions of the World. The book appeared in 1729, after his death. Meslier had spent the greater part of his life working on it. The history of true atheism had begun.

Prior to announcing Meslier as the first atheist philosopher, Onfray considers and dismisses Cristóvão Ferreira, a Portuguese and former Jesuit who renounced his faith under Japanese torture in 1633 and went on to write a book titled The Deception Revealed. Onfray decides that Ferreira was not such a good candidate as Meslier, since Ferreira converted to Zen Buddhism.

The Situationist cultural theorist Raoul Vaneigem praised Meslier's resistance to hierarchical authority, claiming that "the last full-fledged exemplars of priests genuinely loyal to the revolutionary origins of their religion were Jean Meslier and Jacques Roux fomenting jacquerie and riot". According to Colin Brewer (2007), who co-produced a play about Meslier's life,

Historians argue about who was the first overt, post-Classical atheist but Meslier was arguably the first to put his name to an incontrovertibly atheist document. That this important event is largely unrecognised (Meslier was absent from both Richard Dawkins' and Jonathan Miller's recent TV series on atheism) is due partly to Voltaire who published, in 1761, a grossly distorted "Extract" that portrayed Meslier as a fellow-deist and entirely suppressed Meslier's anti-monarchist, proto-communist opinions.

This account, however, ignores the earlier publication of a philosophical treatise entitled De non existentia Dei (On the non-existence of God) by Kazimierz Łyszczyński, executed for atheism in the Polish-Lithuanian Commonwealth in 1689. The treatise, of which fragments survive, ended with the words Ergo non est Deus (Therefore, there is no God.)

== Bibliography ==
- Meslier, Jean (2009). Testament: Memoir of the Thoughts and Sentiments of Jean Meslier. Translated by Michael Shreve. Prometheus Books. ISBN 1-59102-749-7
