= Femi Oyebode =

Nigerian-Born Academic in the Diaspora and Retired Professor of Psychiatry

- Education: University of Ibadan
- Awards: Royal College of Psychiatrists Lifetime Achievement Award
- Scientific career
- Workplaces: University Hospitals Birmingham NHS Foundation Trust

Femi Oyebode is a retired professor and head of the Department of Psychiatry at the University of Birmingham. He has investigated the relationships between literature and psychiatry. His research has considered descriptive psychopathology and delusional misidentification syndrome. He was awarded the 2016 Royal College of Psychiatrists lifetime achievement award.

== Early life and education ==
Oyebode was born in Lagos. He was initially interested in literature and poetry, but his father encouraged him to become a physician. He attended a boarding school, where he had to decide between specialising in science or the humanities. He eventually settled on biology. He studied medicine at the University of Ibadan and moved to Newcastle upon Tyne in 1979. There he completed his higher training under the supervision of Allan Ker, Hamish McClelland and Kurt Schapira. He earned his MRCPsych (membership of the Royal College of Psychiatrists) in 1983 and was soon appointed a consultant psychiatrist in the University Hospitals Birmingham NHS Foundation Trust.

== Research and career ==
In 2005 Oyebode took over writing Sim's Symptoms in the Mind from its original author, psychiatrist Andrew Sims. Sim's Symptoms in the Mind is a textbook that has become a leading introduction in clinical psychopathology. It has been translated into Estonian, Korean, Portuguese and Italian. It is currently in its seventh edition. His MD thesis, which he completed in 1989, was supervised by Ken Davison. He was appointed medical director of the South Birmingham Mental Health Trust in 1997. He completed a further doctorate in the philosophy of mind at Swansea University in 1998.

Oyebode was a consultant psychiatrist at the National Centre for Mental Health Birmingham until his retirement in 2021. He was made director of the South Birmingham Mental Health Trust in 1997. In 2002 he was appointed chief examining officer at the Royal College of Psychiatrists. His research considers the neuropsychiatry of delusional misidentification syndrome. He served as head of the Department of Psychiatry at the University of Birmingham from 2003 to 2009. In 2016 he was awarded the Royal College of Psychiatrists Lifetime Achievement Award.

=== Poetry ===
Alongside his research career, Oyebode is interested in the intersection of psychiatry of literature. He has written about the need for humanities in postgraduate medical education. He has published over seven volumes of poetry. He was given Legend Recognition at the Creativity and Arts Awards in 2017.

=== Selected publications ===
His publications include;

- Oyebode, Femi (2022). Sims' Symptoms in the Mind: Textbook of Descriptive Psychopathology, 7th Edition. ISBN 978-0-7020-8525-3.
- Oyebode, Femi (2009). Mindreadings: Literature and Psychiatry. RCPsych Publications. ISBN 978-1-904671-60-2.
- Oyebode, Femi (2012). Madness at the Theatre. RCPsych Publications. ISBN 978-1-908020-42-0.
- Oyebode, Femi (2004). "Poverty, social inequality and mental health". Advances in Psychiatric Treatment. 10 (3): 216–224. doi:10.1192/apt.10.3.216.

He has served as associate editor of the British Journal of Psychiatry.
