= Étrépigny =

- Commune
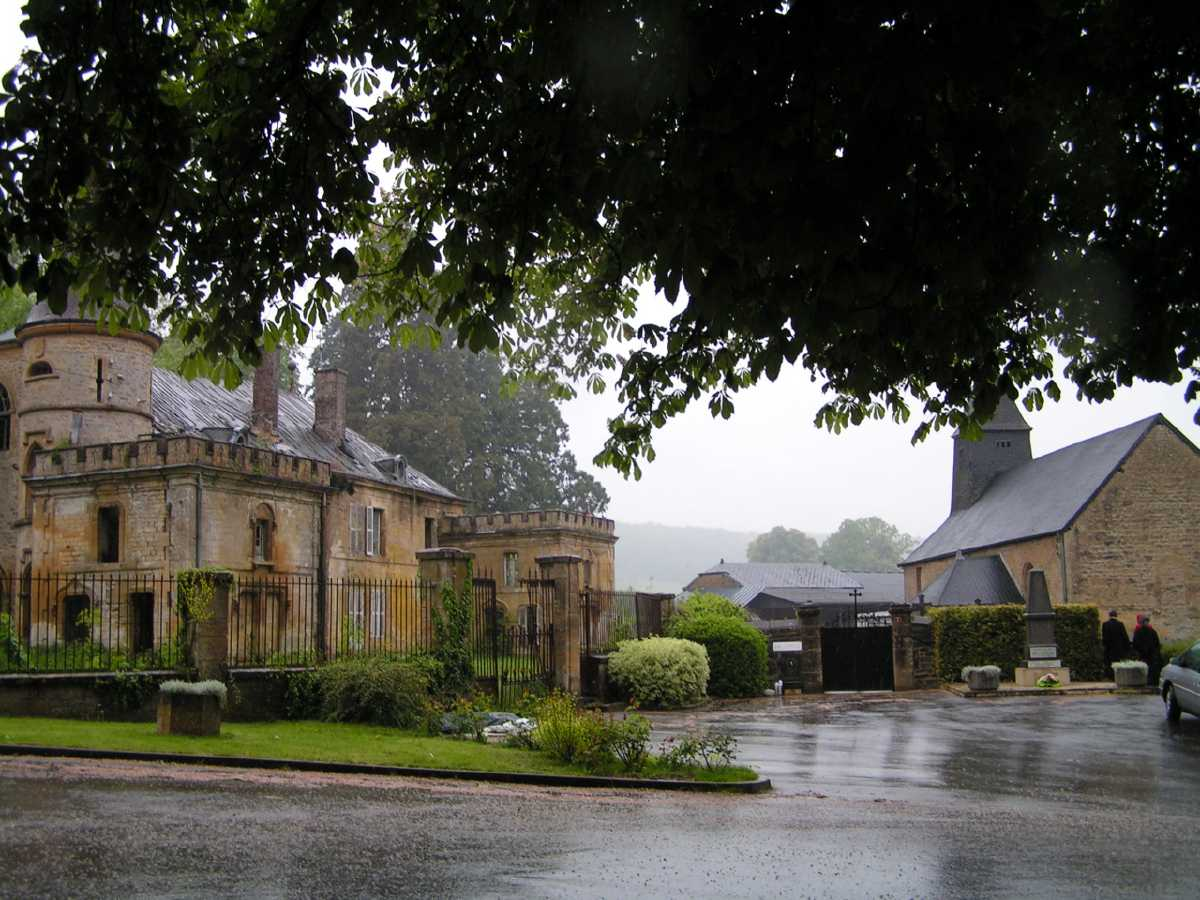
- The church and chateau in Étrépigny

- Coat of arms
- Location of Étrépigny
- Location within France Location within Grand Est
- Coordinates: 49°41′07″N 4°45′17″E
- Country: France
- Region: Grand Est
- Department: Ardennes
- Arrondissement: Charleville-Mézières
- Canton: Nouvion-sur-Meuse
- Intercommunality: CA Ardenne Métropole

Government
  - Mayor (2020–2026): Sarah Mineur
- Area^{1}: 4.23 km^{2} (1.63 sq mi)
- Population (2023): 268
  - Density: 63.4/km^{2} (164/sq mi)
- Time zone: UTC+01:00 (CET)
  - Summer (DST): UTC+02:00 (CEST)
- INSEE/Postal code: 08158 /08160
- ^{1} French Land Register data, which excludes lakes, ponds, glaciers > 1 km^{2} (0.386 sq mi or 247 acres) and river estuaries.

Étrépigny (French pronunciation: [etʁepiɲi]) is a commune in the Ardennes department in the Grand Est region in northern France.

== History ==
The atheist Jean Meslier was the priest at Étrépigny from 1689 to 1729.

== See also ==
- Communes of the Ardennes department
