= Philipp Kneib =

German Catholic theologist

Philipp Kneib (19 February 1870 in Zornheim – 21 July 1915 in Würzburg) was a German Catholic theologist.

== Life and career ==
Bishop Paul Leoplod Haffner ordained Kneib as a priest in 1895 in Mainz. After serving as a Chaplain in Gernsheim, St. Quintin (Mainz), St. Alban, and at the Cathedral in Mainz, he got a precarium in Seligenstadt. In 1899 he became a teacher at a local secondary school, the Progymnasium Seligenstadt. Kneib started to lecture at the seminar for priests in Mainz in 1900, first about the history of the church, and later about moral theology. He qualified as professor in 1903 and became the successor of his former teacher Herman Schell as professor of moral theology at the University of Würzburg in 1906.

The numerous books he published dealt with theological topics and were often combined with an ethical point of view. He made publications in relation to the afterlife ("Jenseits"), the defense of Jesus' mental health, free will, and the soul. His arguments supported the Catholic belief system. He had the explicit aim to convey his readers the belief in central concepts of Christianity.

== Publications ==
- 1898: Die Willensfreiheit und die innere Verantwortlichkeit. (English: The Freedom of Will and Inner Responsibility)
- 1900: Die Unsterblichkeit der Seele: bewiesen aus dem höheren Erkennen und Wollen (English: The immortality of the Soul: Proven from higher recognition and desire)
- 1901: Der Evangeliumsbaumeister Harnack. Eine populäre Auseinandersetzung über ‘Das Wesen des Christentums‘ (English: The Gospel-builder Harnack. A popular Debate About 'The Essence of Christianity)
- 1903: Die Beweise für die Unsterblichkeit der Seele aus allgemeinen psychologischen Tatsachen (English: The Prove for the Immortality of the Soul by Means of Common Psychological Facts)
- 1903: Die "Heteronomie" der christlichen Moral: eine apologetisch-moraltheologische Studie (English: The heteronomy of Christian ethics: An apologetic, moral, and theological study)
- 1904: Die „Lohnsucht“ der christlichen Moral. Ein Beitrag zur Apologie der christlichen Sittenlehre (English: The"Addiction for Reward" in Christian Ethics. A Contribution to the Apologia of the Christian Deontology)
- 1906: Die 'Jenseitsmoral' im Kampfe um ihre Grundlagen (English: The 'ethics of afterlife' in battle with its foundations)
- 1908: Wesen und Bedeutung der Enzyklika gegen den Modernismus (English: Nature and meaning of the encyclical against modernism)
- 1908: Moderne Leben-Jesu-Forschung unter dem Einflusse der Psychiatrie. (English: Modern Quest for the Historical Jesus under the influence of Psychiatry)
- 1912: Handbuch der Apologetik als der wissenschaftlichen Begründung einer gläubigen Weltanschauung (English: Manual of Apologia as the scientific reason of a religious belief system)
- 1913: Ein theoretischer Beweis für die Tatsächlichkeit der Freiheit des menschlichen Willens (English: A theoretical prove for the factuality of the free will)
- 1914: Lebensaufgaben und Jenseitssinn (English: Tasks of life and meaning of afterlife)
