= Herman Schell =

German theologian

Jakob Herman Schell (28 February 1850 – 31 May 1906) was a German philosopher and theologian. He was ordained as a Roman Catholic priest in 1873, he became Professor of theology in 1888.

== Biography ==
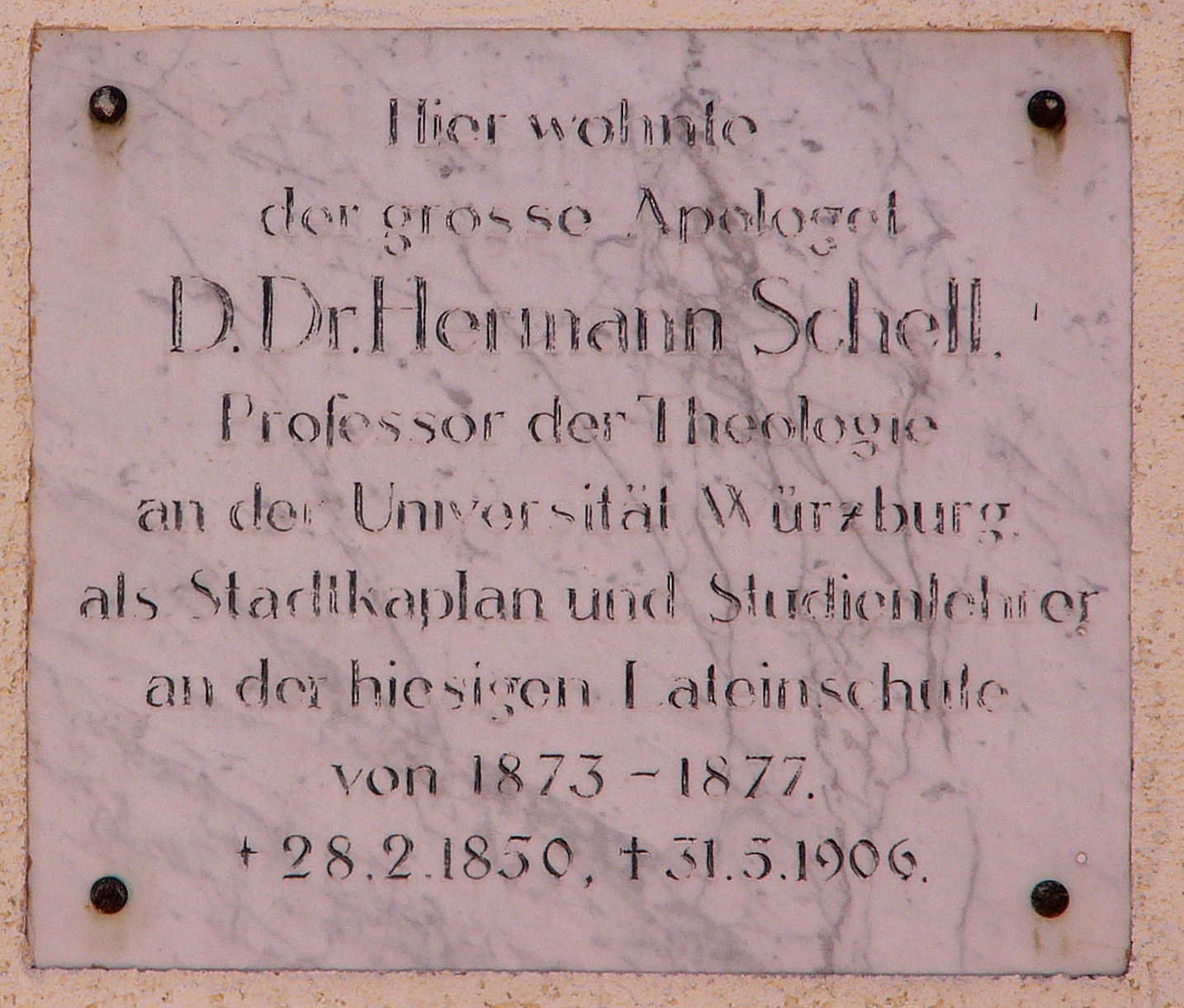
Inscription at the Sceel's house, at number 6 of Pfarrgasse in Amorbach.

Schell attended the Gran ducal Lyceum of Freiburg and in 1868 joyned the local seminary. Then he studied theology and philosophy at the University of Freiburg, where he had Constantine von Schäzler as professor of Scholastic dogmatics, meeting Jakob Sengler, one of the later Christian idealists. In 1870, Schell was dismissed by the seminary (for disciplinary reasons) and moved to University of Würzburg, starting to work with Franz Brentano to his PhD dissertation in Philosophy, titled Die Einheit des Seelenlebens aus den Principien der Aristotelischen Philosophy. In 1872, he delivered the dissertation to Sengler, who was professor at the University of Freiburg. The work was published in 1873 and in the same year Brentano left the Roman Catholic Church. Until his death Schell remained an assiduous apprentice of the Catholic student association named Walhalla Würzburg.

On 17 August 1873 Schell received the priesthood under the hands of Johann Valentin von Reißmann (1807-1875), the then bishop of Würzburg. For six years he covered the role of chaplain and teacher of religion in Amorbach and in Obertheres. In 1879, he moved to Rome to complete his theological formation. Two years later, he returned in Germany and was employed in Margetshöchheim, Dimbach and Marktheidenfeld, and meanwhile he also applied to his thesis in theology, whose title was Das Wirken des dreieinigen Gottes. In November 1883, this work was accepted as a doctoral dissertation by the University of Tübingen and it was finally published two years later. During the 1884/5 wintry semester, Schell was appointed in Würzburg as extraordinary professor of apologetics, archeology and history of the Christian art. In 1888, he got a chair of Christian apologetics and Christian archeology. Two years later, Schell become ordinary professor of dogmatics and in 1894 professor of comparative theology and history of the Christian art.

In 1892, he began to work as university pastor and his Dominical sermons become very popular, as he referred in 1899. In 1893, after the publication of Katholische Dogmatik (in three parts), the local bishop blocked his promotion to the chair of dogmatics.

Subsequently, the monographies Der Katholicismus als Princip des Fortschritts (1897) e Die neue Zeit und der alte Glaube (1898) gave him an international reputation, but they were indexed by the Roman Curia on 24 February 1899. This decision caused resentment in Würzburg and beat Neothomist theologians accused his thought of being monist, rationalist and Protestant.

Between 1901 and 1905 Scheel published Religion und Offenbarung, Jahwe und Christus and Das Evangelium und seine weltgeschichtliche Bedeutung, that didn't cause particular criticisms within the Roman Catholich Church.

On 31 May 1906 Schell died at age 56 of heart failure. The funeral took place on 11 June 1906 at the university church of Würzburg. On 18 July 1908 it was unveiled a public monument in his honour, an initiative which many Roman Catholics saw as a provocation. Subsequently, Schell's chair at the University of Würzburg was assigned to professor Philipp Kneib.

The Schell's writings have been substantially rehabilitated only after the Second Vatican Council.

== Works ==
- Die Einheit des Seelenlebens aus den Principien der Aristotelischen Philosophy, 1873. (PhD dissertation in Philosophy)
- Katholische Dogmatik, (1893). OCLC 1072444397
- Das Wirken des dreieinigen Gottes, 1895, pp. XV, 622. OCLC 1070172812 (PhD dissertation in Theology)
- Der Katholicismus als Princip des Fortschritts (1897). OCLC 215235937
- Die neue Zeit und der alte Glaube (1898)
- Das Evangelium und seine weltgeschichtliche Bedeutung, 1906, 242 pp. OCLC 482129471
- Die göttliche Wahrheit des Christentums, 2 voll., 1895-1896 (part of Gott und Geist). OCLC 471849487
