= Charles Binet-Sanglé =

French military doctor and psychologist

Charles Hippolyte Louis Jules Binet
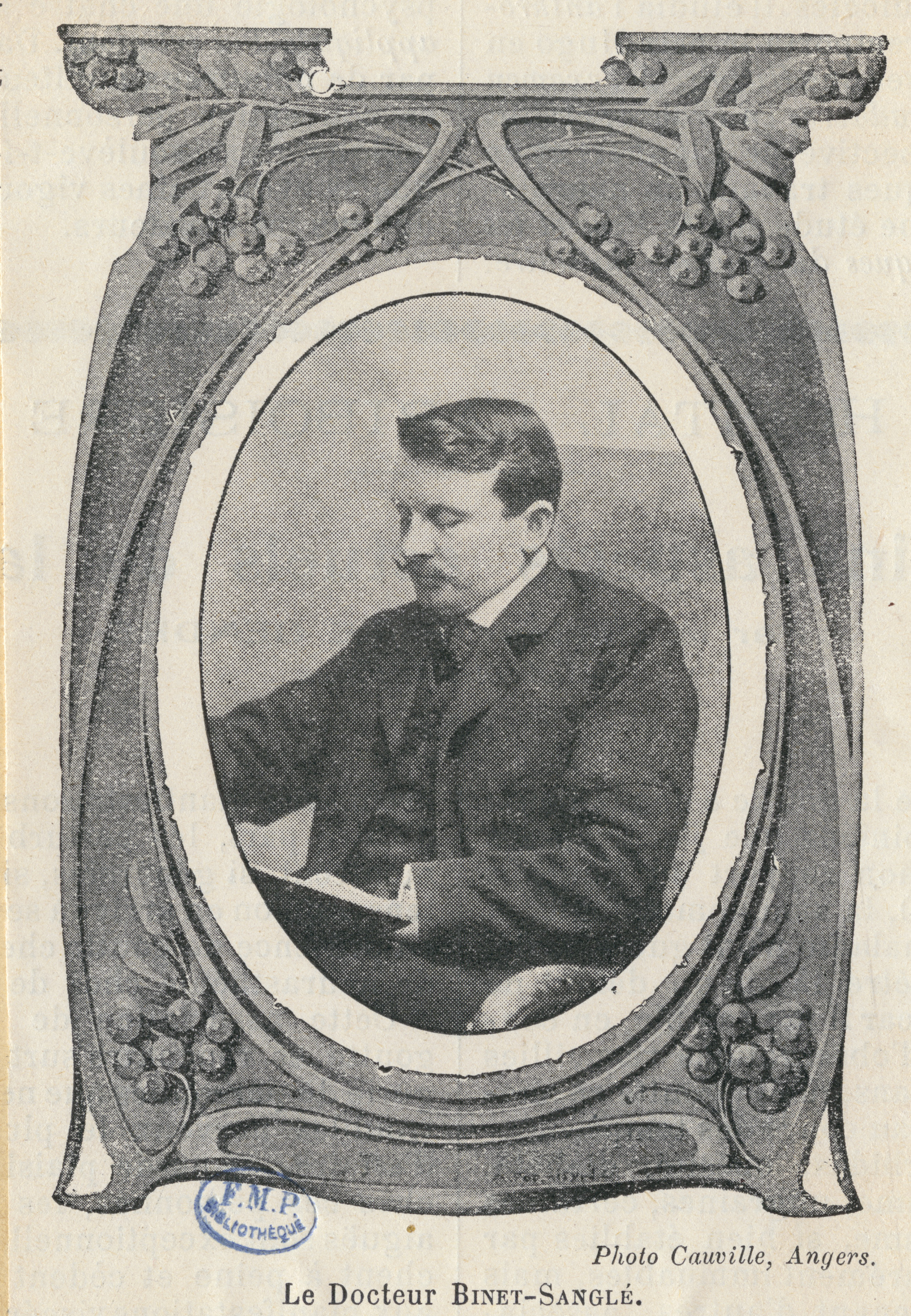
- Born: 4 July 1868; Clamecy, France
- Died: 14 November 1941 (aged 73); Nice, France
- Occupations: Physician, psychologist
- Notable work: La Folie de Jésus; Le Haras humain
- Awards: Legion of Honour

Charles Binet-Sanglé (4 July 1868 – 14 November 1941) was a French military doctor and psychologist, who notably was the first to broadly and thoroughly question the mental health of Jesus, which he did in his four-volume work La Folie de Jésus. It sparked controversy and particularly affected conservative Christians. Albert Schweitzer, among others, referred to this work in his medical dissertation Die psychiatrische Beurteilung Jesu: Darstellung und Kritik (The Psychiatric Study of Jesus: Exposition and Criticism, 1913). Schweitzer writes in his booklet Out of My Life and Thoughts, referring to Charles Binet-Sanglé and other authors dealing with the mental health of Jesus:

Now I had to complete a year of practical work as an intern in the hospitals and to write my thesis for the doctorate. As my subject I chose a critical review of all that had been published about the mental illness from which Jesus was supposed to have suffered. In the main I was concerned with the works of De Loosten, William Hirsch, and Binet-Sangle. In my studies on the life of Jesus I had documented that he lived in the world of contemporary Judaic thought, which seems fantastic to us now, with the expectation of the end of the world and the appearance of a supernatural Messianic Kingdom. I was immediately reproached for making Him a visionary, or even a person under the sway of delusions. Now my task was to decide whether, from a medical standpoint, this peculiar Messianic consciousness of His was in any way bound up with some psychic disturbance.

— (p. 107)

His other most influential work, Le Haras Humain (The Human Stud-Farm), suggested that euthanasia was necessary in some cases, and that a eugenic institute must be founded to encourage education of the improvement for the human race. The book was heavily censored in France.

He was decorated Knight of the Legion of Honour in 1912 and promoted Officer of the same order in 1922.
