= Oskar Holtzmann =

German theologian (1859–1934)

Oskar Holtzmann (20 January 1859, Stuttgart – 10 March 1934, Giessen) was a German theologian who specialized in New Testament studies.

From 1877 to 1883 he studied theology at the universities of Strasbourg, Göttingen and Giessen and at the seminary in Friedberg. Afterwards, he served as a pastor in Bickenbach and as a teacher at a number of different schools. In 1889 he became a lecturer at the University of Giessen, where during the following year, he was appointed an associate professor of New Testament exegesis.

Albert Schweitzer in his work The Quest of the Historical Jesus described Holtzmann's research on Jesus.

== Published works ==
In 1901 he issued Leben Jesu, a book that was later translated into English and published as The life of Jesus, translated by J.T. Bealby and Maurice A. Canney (London: Black, 1904). Holtzmann's other noted works include:

- Das Johannesevangelium, untersucht und erklärt, 1887 – The Gospel of John, investigated and explained.
- Geschichte des volkes Israel; 2 volumes, 1887–88 (with Bernhard Stade) – History of the people of Israel.
- Das Leben Jesu, 1901 (English translation: The Life of Jesus, by J. T. Bealby and Maurice A. Canney, London, 1904).
- Das Messianitätsbewusstsein Jesu und seine neueste Bestreitung. Vortrag, 1902 – The Messianic Consciousness of Jesus and the most recent denial of it. A Lecture.
- Religionsgeschichtliche Vorträge, 1902 – Religious history lectures.
- War Jesus ekstatiker? : eine Untersuchung zum Leben Jesu, 1903 – Was Jesus ecstatic? : A study of Jesus' sanity.
- Der christliche Gottesglaube : seine Vorgeschichte und Urgeschichte, 1905 – The Christian belief in God: its history and prehistory.
- Neutestamentliche Zeitgeschichte, 1906 – New Testament history.
- Christus, 1907 – Christ.
- Der Tosephtatraktat Berakot; Text, Übersetzung und Erklärung, 1912 – The Tosephtatraktat Berakot; translation and explanation.
