= Mazerny =

- Commune
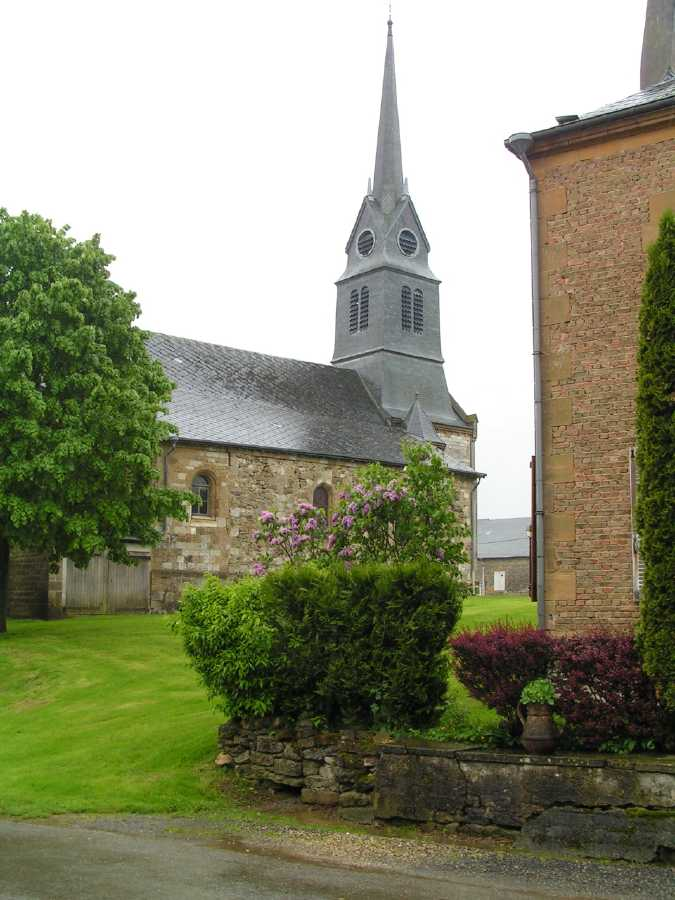
- The church in Mazerny
- Location of Mazerny
- Location within France Location within Grand Est
- Coordinates: 49°36′38″N 4°36′50″E
- Country: France
- Region: Grand Est
- Department: Ardennes
- Arrondissement: Charleville-Mézières
- Canton: Nouvion-sur-Meuse
- Intercommunality: Crêtes Préardennaises

Government
  - Mayor (2020–2026): Anne Oudart
- Area^{1}: 12.3 km^{2} (4.7 sq mi)
- Elevation: 220 m (720 ft)
- Population (2023): 119
  - Density: 9.67/km^{2} (25.1/sq mi)
- Time zone: UTC+01:00 (CET)
  - Summer (DST): UTC+02:00 (CEST)
- INSEE/Postal code: 08283 /08430
- ^{1} French Land Register data, which excludes lakes, ponds, glaciers > 1 km^{2} (0.386 sq mi or 247 acres) and river estuaries.

Mazerny (French pronunciation: [mazɛʁni]) is a commune in the Ardennes department in northern France.

== Population ==
Historical population
Year	Pop.	±% p.a.
1968	150	—
1975	107	−4.71%
1982	111	+0.53%
1990	110	−0.11%
1999	112	+0.20%
2007	119	+0.76%
2012	123	+0.66%
2017	125	+0.32%
2023	119	−0.82%
Source: INSEE

== See also ==
- Communes of the Ardennes department
