= Andrew Sims (psychiatrist) =

British psychiatrist (1938–2022)

Andrew Sims (1938–2022) was president of the Royal College of Psychiatrists from 1990 to 1993. He was Professor of Psychiatry at the University of Leeds. He wrote a textbook on descriptive psychopathology titled Symptoms in the Mind, now titled Sims' Symptoms in the Mind and in its 6th edition written by Femi Oyebode.

== Early life and education ==
He grew up in Exeter and then went on to read medicine at Emmanuel College, Cambridge and Westminster Hospital Medical School. He completed his postgraduate training in psychiatry at the University of Manchester, and in Birmingham. In 1974 he earned his MD from the University of Cambridge for his thesis on prognosis in neurotic disorders.

== Personal life ==
He had a wife, Dr. Ruth Sims who is also a psychiatrist and four children including Dr. David Sims and 12 grandchildren. A memorial service for Professor Sims was held on Friday 17 March at 2.30pm at St. George's Church, Great George Street, Leeds, LS1 3BR.
