= Hewat =

Hewat is a given name and a surname. Notable people with the name include:

Surname:

- Alexander Hewat (1739–1824), the first historian of South Carolina and Georgia
- Andrew Fergus Hewat FRSE (1884–1957), Scottish physician involved with mental health
- Brian Hewat (1894–1970), New Zealand politician
- Corrina Hewat (born 1970), Scottish harpist and composer, Music Tutor of the Year at Na Trads in 2013
- David Hewat (1866–1959), New Zealand cricketer
- Elizabeth G. K. Hewat (1895–1968), PhD (University of Edinburgh), missionary, campaigner for women's equality, historian of Scottish missions
- Peter Hewat (born 1978), Australian rugby union player now playing in Japan's Top League for Suntory Sungoliath
- Reece Hewat (born 1995), South African-born Australian rugby union player
- Richard Alexander Hewat (1896–1918), American pursuit pilot who flew with the Royal Flying Corps (RFC) in World War I
- Robert Hewat (1863–1953), New Zealand cricketer
- Tim Hewat (1928–2004), Australian television producer and journalist
- William Hewat, Irish politician and company director

Given name:

- James Hewat McKenzie (1869–1929), British parapsychologist, founder of the British College of Psychic Science
- William Hewat McLeod (1932–2009), New Zealand scholar who helped establish Sikhism studies as a distinctive field outside India

== See also ==
- Hewitt (name)
- Hewit, surname
