= William Laurel Harris =

American painter

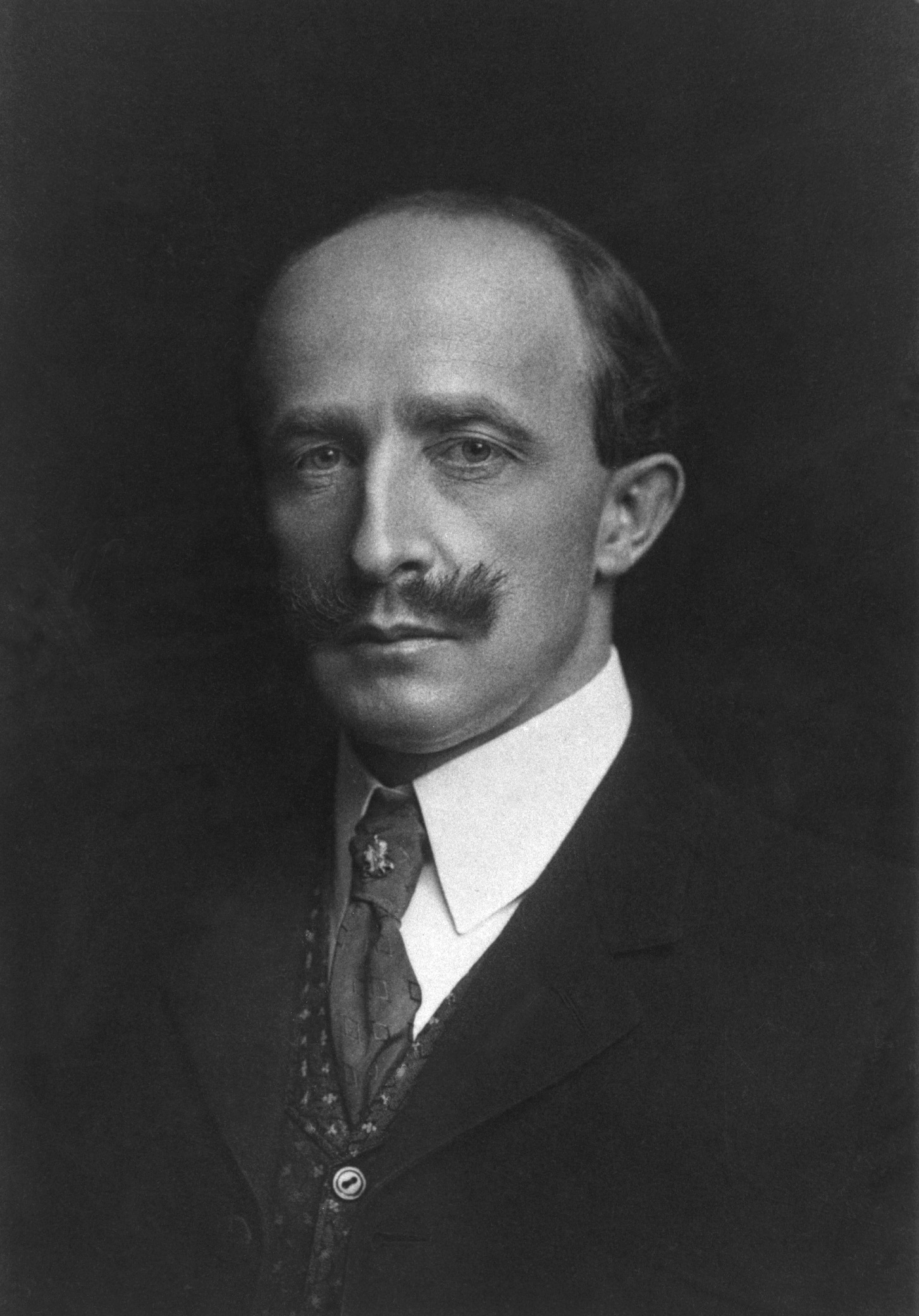
- Will Harris, portrait probably in New York City around 1912 at the time of the feature article on the artist's work at the Paulist Father's Church in Architectural Record
- Born: February 18, 1870; Brooklyn, New York
- Died: July 3, 1924 (aged 54); Lake George, New York
- Education: Art Students League, New York, École des Beaux-Arts, Paris, T. W. Dewing, Jean-Léon Gérôme
- Known for: Muralist
- Notable work: Paulist Fathers Church, New York
- Movement: Pre-Raphaelite, City Beautiful, Beaux-Arts

William Laurel Harris (February 18, 1870 – September 24, 1924) was an American muralist, educator, editor, and arts organizer.

Harris was a member of the Municipal Art Society (of which he was president in 1912), the Architectural League of New York (of which he was vice president), The National Mural Painters Society, and The Fine Arts Federation; he also founded the Art Centre with Katherine Dreier. He painted murals, designed the decorative elements, and continued the work of John LaFarge at the Church of Saint Paul the Apostle (also known as the Paulist Fathers Church) on 59th Street and 9th Avenue, New York City. The church was called "an experiment in democracy in American art" by the order's founder, Isaac Thomas Hecker. Other contributors to its decoration include Augustus Saint-Gaudens, Stanford White, Frederick William MacMonnies, and Bela Pratt.

Harris labored on this project for 15 years, from 1898 to 1913 until fired by the Paulists in what appears to have been a personal dispute. A disastrous "cleaning" in 1958 removed fourteen of Harris's Saints on side chapel walls, much of Harris's unique ornamentation, and his color treatment. A renovation in the 1990s did not restore any of Harris's decorative painting, but did preserve many of his most important works, including a nativity scene, the Virgin Mary Enthroned, St. Patrick's and St. Catherine's altars, "The Precious Blood", a carved and painted frieze featuring lambs, a memorial to deceased Paulists, and a 60-foot-wide (18 m) crucifixion.

== Boyhood and education ==
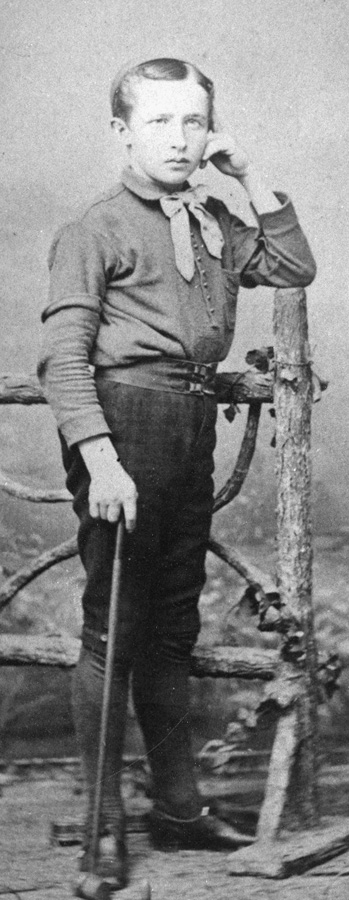
As a boy, Harris was befriended by both Thomas Wilmer Dewing and Augustus and Augusta Saint-Gaudens who welcomed him at their Cornish, New Hampshire homes and studios.

Harris was born in Brooklyn, New York, to Henry and Julia (Gillingham) Harris. Orphaned in Brooklyn at age 4, Harris was raised by his grandmother in Windsor, Vermont. He there met Augustus Saint-Gaudens, Maxfield Parrish, Stephen Parrish; and began his studies with T.W. Dewing.

Harris traveled to Boston and studied with Dewing at the School of the Museum of Fine Arts, Boston. At age 17 he was Dewing's monitor at the Art Students League in New York City.

The next year Harris studied art at Académie Julian, Paris with, among others, Paul Gauguin and at École des Beaux-Arts where he became massier under Jean-Léon Gérôme. While in Paris Harris pursued his lifelong interest in the applied arts while in Paris, studying, and perhaps working, at the Gobelin Tapestry Works.

Harris's pastel sketch appeared on the cover of Architectural Record Magazine in 1913, the year of his dispute with the Paulists.

== The Paulist fathers ==
The Paulists (Society of St. Paul the Apostle) were the first order in the Roman Catholic Communion founded in the United States. Featuring works by John LaFarge, Stanford White, Frederick MacMonnies, Bela Pratt, Paulist leader Isaac Hecker wished the church edifice at 59th Street and 9th Avenue in Manhattan to be "an experiment in Democracy in American art." In the 1890s, William Laurel Harris began, under Father George Deshon, decoration of the church. He would work and live with the Paulists until 1913, taking over from John LaFarge not only the mural paintings of Saints and Parables, but the "complete decorative scheme" of the massive edifice.

== Other murals ==
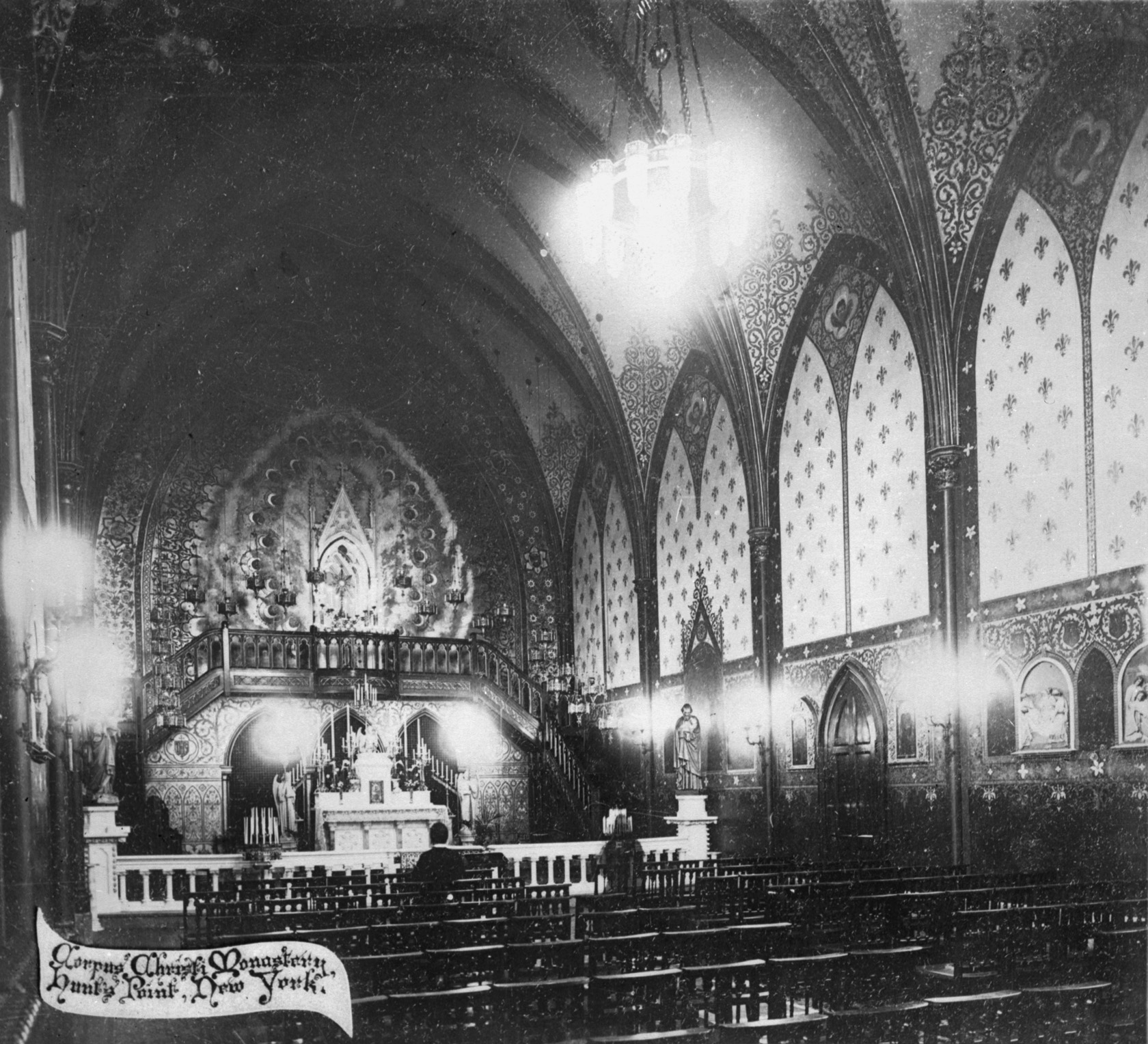
Interior view of Corpus Christie Chapel showing Harris's decorations "echoing and balancing one another in well defined color harmony."

Along with his work for the Paulist Fathers Harris's other work included paintings and color schemes in the church of St. Nicholas of the Children in Pasaic, NJ, a Dominican Monastery in Hunts Point, NY, Catholic Club of New York, as well as outdoor murals and chapels at Lake George, NY.

Among his educational work was the founding of an "art and trades school" in New York City called the Art Centre. He also trained younger painters as assistants during his projects. Harris himself had been an assistant to Edwin Howland Blashfield during the painting of the dome of Library of Congress in Washington, D.C. He also wrote editorials for the New York Times and was editor of Good Furniture, a magazine of home decor.

He was president of Municipal Art Society at the time of the historic 1916 city zoning resolution.

William Laurel Harris died at age 54 at his studio adjacent to the Paulist Fathers retreat at Lake George, New York, of a stroke. He is buried in Windsor, Vermont.

== Writer and editor ==
Harris's first articles on church decoration appear in ecclesiastical publications in 1903. He wrote book reviews for the New York Times, compiled a published catalog of murals in the United States for the Fine Arts Federation and, for over 11 years, was contributing editor for Good Furniture magazine.

For out of old fields, as men saithe,
Cometh al this new corn from yere to yere.
And out of old bookes, in good faithe,
Cometh al this new science that men lere.

— Chaucer.

The idea thus quaintly expressed as a truism some five hundred years ago is equally true today; it is true not only of old fields and old books, but of our art. Thus it is quite necessary in beginning our article on Church Decoration to turn our thoughts backward to the art of days long past ...

The spirit of St. Francis is still operative; the struggle against the powers of evil is still going on. In art and in life it is the struggle between honesty and falsehood, between simplicity and ostentation, between true nobility and vulgarity. On the outcome of this struggle hangs the future of American Art.

— William Laurel Harris, "St. Francis and his Influence on Church Decoration," Christian Art, Aug. 1908, p. 203:

It is by reading the histories of great men that we learn to appreciate the lessons they taught and comprehend the heroic purposes of their lives. The perspective of ages makes clear the exalted characters of artists long since departed. Unimportant facts and accidental details are soon eliminated or forgotten in a forceful expression of some great ideal. With men of our own time and country our opinion is confused and our judgment bewildered by a multiplicity of facts and a conflict of figures. Yet, it is by studying the actions of our contemporaries, and the lives of those men who have immediately preceded us, that we may most easily learn the varying and prodigious forces that have, in our own day, aided in the upbuilding of our American commonwealth. The lives of great artists are like shining objects floating on troubled water, indicating to us by the direction of their actions the tendency of mighty currents. Of no artist can this be said more truly than of the late John White Alexander, whose untimely death and impressive funeral were recorded in the July issue of Good Furniture.

— William Laurel Harris, John White Alexander, His Influence on American Art and Industry, New York City, 1916.
