= Walter Elliott (priest) =

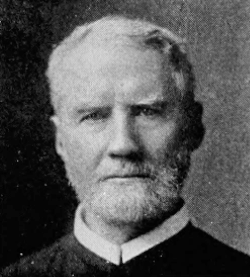
- Born: 1842; Detroit, Michigan
- Died: April 18, 1928 (aged 86); Washington, D.C.
- Burial place: St. Paul the Apostle Church
- Education: University of Notre Dame
- Occupations: Lawyer, clergyman

Walter Elliott (1842–1928) was an American Roman Catholic priest and missionary, who authored the controversial 1891 book Life of Father Hecker, a biography of the missionary Isaac Hecker, which sparked the Americanism controversy. Elliott was a graduate of Notre Dame, successful attorney, and Civil War veteran before joining the Paulists.

== Life ==
Walter Elliot was born in Detroit, Michigan in 1842, the son of Judge Robert Thomas Elliott, formerly of Tipperary. He was educated in the Christian Brothers schools and at the age of twelve was sent to Notre Dame. Upon graduation, he prospected for gold around Pikes Peak before returning east to Cincinnati, where he entered law school.

Elliott was admitted to the bar shortly before the outbreak of hostilities, whereupon he enlisted in the 5th Ohio Infantry. In 1862, the regiment was sent into Virginia's Shenandoah Valley. On June 9. 1862, he was captured at the Battle of Port Republic but was exchanged three months later and returned to his regiment. Elliot saw action at Chancellorsville, Gettysburg, Lookout Mountain and took part in the capture of Atlanta. After the death in combat of two of his brothers, he acceded to his mother's request and left the army some six months after his enlistment expired.

Elliott returned to Cincinnati and resumed the practice of law. He first met Isaac Hecker in Detroit, during one of Hecker's lecture tours. In 1868 he joined the Missionary Society of Saint Paul the Apostle and was ordained in 1872. He then set sail for California via Cape Horn, along with four other Paulist missioners. In 1894 he founded the "Cleveland Apostolate", a group of missionary priests who spoke on Catholic doctrine and practices to non-Catholics.

Elliott was a close associate of Hecker's and wrote a biography of him after Hecker's death. The preface to the French translation inaccurately indicated that Hecker had supported a Catholicism that put less emphasis on authority and more on individual initiative. This drew the attention of Rome and prompted a letter from Pope Leo XIII to Cardinal Gibbons expressing concern that the Church in America should be cautious of adapting too much to American culture.

Elliott served as novice master from 1899 to 1902. He followed Hecker in a type of spirituality influenced by the humanist tradition of Francis de Sales. For several years he helped to edit the Paulist monthly magazine The Catholic World. In his later years, Elliott served as editor of and contributor to The Missionary magazine. He died in Washington, D.C., on April 18, 1928, and was laid to rest in the crypt at St. Paul the Apostle Church in New York.

== Works ==
- Life of Father Hecker, (1891)
- Sermons and Conferences of Johannes Tauler, trans. (1910).
- The Life of Christ, The Catholic Book Exchange: New York, (1903).
- Parish Sermons, (1917).
- A Retreat for Priests, (1924).
- Jesus Crucified
- The Spiritual Life
- contributions to the Catholic Encyclopedia
