= St. Paul the Apostle Church (Manhattan) =

Catholic church in New York City

Saint Paul the Apostle Church
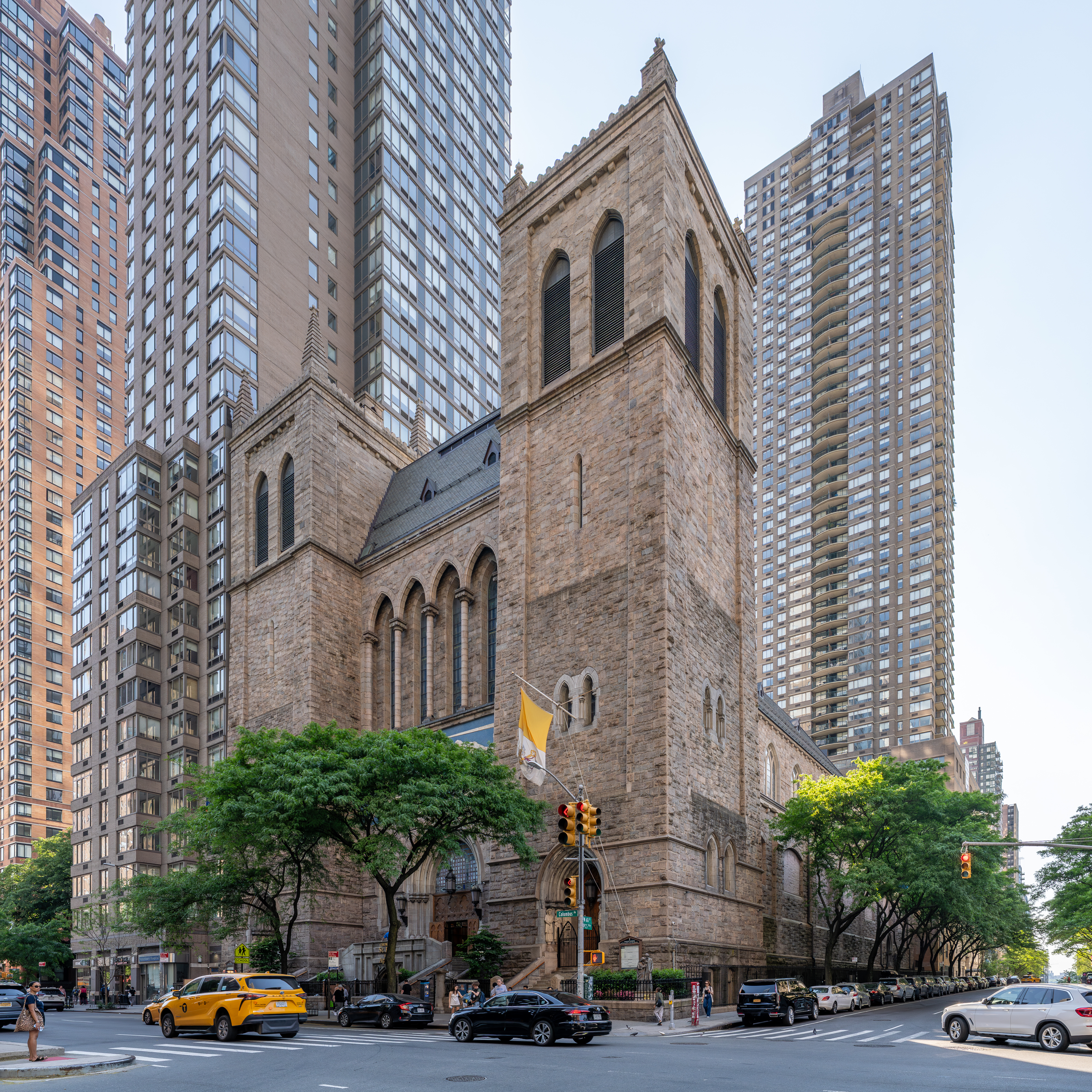
- (2026)

- Location within New York City
- 40°46′11″N 73°59′7″W
- Location: 8-10 Columbus Avenue; Manhattan, New York
- Country: United States
- Denomination: Roman Catholic
- Religious order: Paulist Fathers
- Website: stpaultheapostle.org

History
- Status: Parish church Mother church of the Paulist Fathers
- Founded: 1858 (parish); 1859 (original church and rectory); 1876 (current church)
- Dedicated: January 25, 1885

Architecture
- Functional status: Active
- Heritage designation: NRHP; NYC Landmark
- Years built: 1876–1884

Administration
- Archdiocese: New York

Clergy
- Pastor(s): Fr. Eric Andrews, CSP
- Church of St. Paul the Apostle
- U.S. National Register of Historic Places
- New York State Register of Historic Places
- New York City Landmark
- Architect: Jeremiah O'Rourke and George Deshon
- Architectural style: Late Gothic Revival
- NRHP reference No.: 91001723
- NYSRHP No.: 06101.001488
- NYCL No.: 2260A

Significant dates
- Added to NRHP: December 5, 1991
- Designated NYSRHP: October 10, 1991
- Designated NYCL: June 25, 2013

The Church of St. Paul the Apostle is a Catholic church on the Upper West Side of Manhattan in New York City. It is the mother church of the Paulist Fathers, the first religious community of Catholic priests founded in the United States.

== History and architecture ==
The parish was founded in 1858, and their original church was a simple brick structure built on part of the current lot, but the congregation soon outgrew it.

A new Late Victorian Gothic Revival-style church was built between 1876 and 1884 designed by Jeremiah O'Rourke and Paulist priest George Deshon, a military engineer trained at West Point, who took over the project six years into construction when O'Rourke died, and probably simplified the design. Isaac Hecker, who founded the Paulist Fathers, may have had a hand in its design as well, using the thirteenth-century Santa Croce in Florence as a model. The building utilized Tarrytown gray granite stones salvaged from the Croton Aqueduct along with stones from other structures in Manhattan. The granite for the stone entrance steps was salvaged from the French Second Empire-style Booth's Theatre on Sixth Avenue at 23rd Street.

The new building was dedicated on January 25, 1885, but was still not complete at that time: the 114-foot (35 m) towers had yet to reach their final height, and much of the interior declarations were still to be installed.

The church is known for its ecclesiastical art, and contains interior elements designed between 1887 and 1890 by Stanford White and many large decorated side chapels. Later stained glass windows were added by John LaFarge. Other artists who worked within include Augustus Saint-Gaudens, Frederick MacMonnies, and Bertram Goodhue, who is responsible for the floor mosaics. White and Goodhue also offered advice on design elements. Lumen Martin Winter's Angel of the Resurrection adorns Hecker's sarcophagus, located in the northeast corner of the nave. Other Paulist Fathers are entombed in crypt off a chapel on the lower level of the church.

The New York Daily Tribune reviewed the architecture as "vast, plain, fortress-like in its solidity—almost repelling in the aesthetic cast without and within, yet it is the most August, unworldly interior of this continent."

The church was added to the National Register of Historic Places in 1991, and designated a New York City Landmark in 2013. A major renovation and restoration of the church was begun around 2000, and as of 2013 is still underway.

== Parish ==
In 1858, the Paulist Fathers first took possession of a frame house containing a small chapel at 14 West 60th Street. The community's motherhouse is on West 59th Street, adjacent to the church. The present building dates from the 1930s.

The life of the parish has mirrored the growth, decline and rebirth of the Hell's Kitchen neighborhood. In 1903 the 9th Avenue elevated train ran directly in front of the church. In 1925, the Paulists launched radio station WLWL that operated from 1925 to 1937. The parish opened an elementary school in 1886 and a high school division in 1922. When financial issues forced the Archdiocese of New York to close the school, St. Paul's established pre-school centers funded by Project Head Start under the Economic Opportunity Act of 1964, providing students with free lunches and medical and dental care. The parish's last school closed in 1974.

The parish went through a financially difficult period in the 1960s and 1970s, with the possibility of bankruptcy in 1973, and razing the church for an apartment building was briefly considered. The church sold the western part of their lot in the mid-1980s, and was able to build a new Parish Center at 405 West 59th Street by selling its air rights to enable the building of a 40-story apartment tower, which sits close to the church's south tower.

Today, the parish, with five Masses each Sunday, has a large young professionals community and a Spanish-speaking community. "Apostolist" is the Young Adult Program at St. Paul's; the Young Adult Choir sings at the 5 p.m. Mass on Sunday. The Youth Ministry also sponsors a Food Bank Pantry. "Out at St Paul (OSP)" is the LGBTQ+ ministry of the parish. The "Mustard Seed Guild" supports orphanages in Nicaragua and the Dominican Republic. The parish also has an active conference of the Society of Saint Vincent de Paul.

St. Paul's also hosts a bookstore and gift shop at the east end of the nave. St. Paul the Apostle serves as the parish for Catholic students at nearby Fordham University, the John Jay College of Criminal Justice, and the Juilliard School.

The large church basement has been used as a cafeteria for the parish school, a homeless shelter, soup kitchen, rehearsal space for The Rockettes, and for boxing matches. From 1996 to 2003, it was the home of the multi-annual Big Apple Comic Convention.

== Möller pipe organ ==
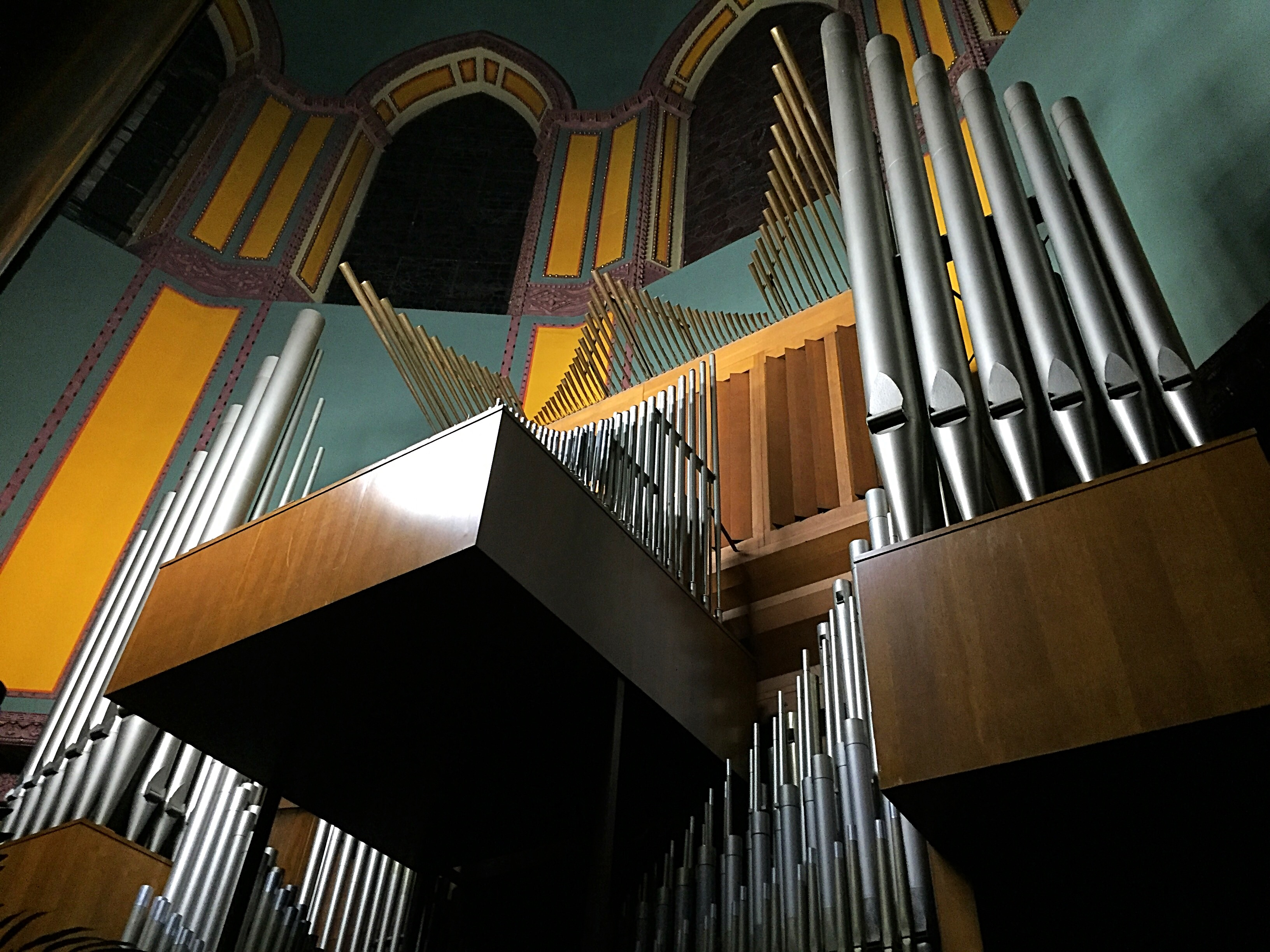
M.P. Möller Pipe Organ Company's Opus 9987, built in 1965.

The current organ at The Church of St. Paul the Apostle is M.P. Möller Pipe Organ Company's Opus 9987, built in 1965. With 4,965 pipes, the instrument has 4 manuals (keyboards), 83 ranks, and 78 stops. Twelve of the stops are made up of pipework from the church's previous instrument, E.M. Skinner Opus 544, built in 1925. The organ speaks from two different parts of the room, giving the effect of two instruments in one. At the front of the sanctuary, with large pedal towers that surround the high altar, sits the main organ. Perched on the south wall of the sanctuary is the nave organ. Both organs are playable simultaneously from one French-style console, built by the Peragallo Pipe Organ Company in 2000, which rests on a movable platform. Renowned organist Virgil Fox recorded The Christmas Album on the Möller Organ in 1965. By 2020 the Möller instrument was in need of restoration. In February 2021 the church acquired the historic Roosevelt Organ Works Opus 525 that had previously been installed at the former All Saints Church.

== See also ==
- List of New York City Designated Landmarks in Manhattan from 14th to 59th Streets
- List of New York City Designated Landmarks in Manhattan from 59th to 110th Streets
- National Register of Historic Places listings in Manhattan from 14th to 59th Streets
- National Register of Historic Places listings in Manhattan from 59th to 110th Streets
