= Hewit =

Hewit is a surname. Notable people with the name include:

- Alex Hewit (born 1985), American lacrosse player
- Augustine Francis Hewit (1820–1897), American priest
- Gordon Hewit (1958–2009), British swimmer
- Mabel Hewit (1903–1984), American woodblock print artist
- Nathaniel Hewit (1788–1867), American clergyman

== See also ==
- Hewitt (name), given name and surname
