= Augustine Francis Hewit =

American Redemptorist priest (1820–1897)

Father Augustine Francis Hewit, CSP

Augustine Francis Hewit (Fairfield, Connecticut, U.S.A., 27 November 1820 – New York, 3 July 1897) was an American Redemptorist priest, and second Superior General of the Paulist Fathers.

== Life ==
Nathaniel Augustus Hewit was born in Fairfield, Connecticut. His father was Nathaniel Hewit, a prominent Congregationalist minister; and his mother, Rebecca Hillhouse Hewit, was a daughter of James Hillhouse, United States Senator from Connecticut. He was educated at the Fairfield public school, Phillips Andover Academy, and Amherst College, where he was a member of Alpha Delta Phi He was graduated in 1839.

Brought up a Protestant, he was a convinced Christian only after graduation. Shortly after his conversion he began the study of theology at the Congregationalist seminary at East Windsor, Connecticut. Scarcely had he finished its prescribed course and been licensed to preach, he entered the Episcopal Church. The Oxford Movement in that Church had already extended to America, and Hewit became one of its most ardent followers. He received the Anglican order of deacon in 1844, but with the expressed condition that he might interpret the Thirty-nine Articles in the sense of Tract 90. He traveled south for his health where he ministered to slaves on a large North Carolina plantation.

The conversion of John Henry Newman in 1845 gradually unsettled his belief in the validity of the claims of Anglicanism, and he was received into the Roman Catholic Church, 25 March 1846. He then studied Catholic theology privately under the direction of Patrick N. Lynch, afterwards bishop of Charleston, and James A. Corcoran, subsequently professor at Overbrook Seminary, Philadelphia. He was ordained priest on the first anniversary of his conversion by Ignatius A. Reynolds, bishop of Charleston. He then became a teacher in a Bishop England at Charleston, and assisted Reynolds in the compilation of Bishop England's works for publication. This occupation called him to Baltimore and Philadelphia, where he resided with Francis Kenrick and became acquainted with John Nepomucen Neumann. Here he was attracted to the Congregation of the Most Holy Redeemer, which he entered in 1849. He made his religious profession 28 November 1850.

As a Redemptorist he became Consulter to the Provincial and worked on parish missions with Isaac Hecker, Clarence A. Walworth, Francis A. Baker, and George Deshon, until with them he was dispensed from his religious vows by a decree of the Roman Congregation of Bishops and Regulars, 6 March 1858. Under the leadership of Hecker all of these priests immediately formed the Missionary Society of St. Paul the Apostle (Paulist Fathers) in New York, with a rule enjoining poverty and obedience with the obligations of the vows. Hewit took the name in religion of "Augustine Francis".

Hewit was chosen to draft the first constitution and laws of this new institute, which aimed to satisfy the aspirations of clerics who desire to lead an apostolic and religious life in community without assuming the canonical responsibilities of the religious state, strictly so called. "Hewit's great scholarship, his balance of judgment, and his intellectual keenness gave to his counsels a weight and maturity that had no little influence in pruning the spirit and traditions of the community."

As a Paulist, Hewit preferred teaching to giving parish missions, and taught for thirty years in the Paulist scholasticate. He was a frequent contributor to Hecker's Catholic World magazine.

On the death of Hecker (1888), Hewit was almost unanimously chosen superior general of the institute and held this office until his death. One of his first acts as superior was to pledge the Paulist community to support the Catholic University of America in Washington, D.C. St. Thomas College for the education of candidates of the institute was accordingly opened in one of the university buildings in 1889. Under his direction, Walter Elliott gave the first regular missions to non-Catholics in the United States, and a new foundation of the institute was established in San Francisco.

Pope Leo XIII conferred upon him the degree of D.D. as did his alma mater, Amherst College. Hewit died in New York, 3 July 1897 at the age of 76.

== Works ==
A prolific writer, he was for twenty years one of the foremost Catholic apologists in the United States. In this field he was orthodox, noted for his loyalties to the magisterium of the Church and his agreement with the opinions of the most approved theologians. He wrote nothing that could be styled original; he simply aimed to explain and popularize the teaching of the doctors and saints of the Catholic Church.

Most of his articles were published in "The Catholic World" and "The American Catholic Quarterly Review"; a few of them are in a volume entitled "Problems of the Age with Studies in St. Augustine on Kindred Topics". His most popular book was "The Life of Rev. Francis A. Baker", one of his companions, who died in 1865.

== Sources ==
- Hewit, How I became a Catholic, Stories of Conversions (New York, 1892).
- "Very Rev. Augustine F. Hewit" in The Catholic World; August, 1897.
- O'Keefe, "Very Rev. Augustine F. Hewit" in Amer. Cath. Quarterly Review (July, 1903).
- Hewit, Life of Rev. Francis A. Baker (New York, 1865).
- Elliott, Life of Isaac Thomas Hecker (New York, 1891).
- Walworth, Clarence A. The Oxford Movement in America (New York: Catholic Book Exchange, 1895).
