= Nog's Vision =

1973 book by Brian Hall

- Author: Brian P. Hall
- Illustrator: Donna Griffin
- Language: English
- Genre: Fiction
- Publisher: Paulist Press
- Publication date: 1973

Nog's Vision, (or, Nog's Vision: A Fantasy Journey into Laughter, Dreams & Self-Respect for Pricklies & Would Be Non-Prickly Pricklies Young & Old) is a fiction book first published by Paulist Press, a Catholic publisher, in 1973.

It was written by Brian P. Hall and illustrated by Donna Griffin.

The themes of the book include prophets, self-determination, creativity, and fantasy. It is written in a style that is acceptable for children.

== Story ==
The plot follows Nog, a character that is born blue and smooth, in a fantastical society of "Pricklies." In this society all of the spiked creatures have different jobs and roles determined by their color at birth. The birth of a "non-Prickly Pricklie" (Nog) causes concern, confusion, and chaos. Even more disruptive is that Nog, who "has dreams and visions," is not only satisfied but full of merriment. Nog says he will "give dreams and visions" to all the Pricklies.

The night after Nog is born, the "King Pricklie" has a dream in which Nog drives a car, with the King in it, into the sky. They pass through a cloud that looks identical to the King and land on a rocky planet. Nog tells the King that all the land in his, and they float in the air surveying the beautiful landscape. The King begins to laugh, and as he turn toward Nog, he realizes Nog is no longer there.

When the King awakes, he is stunned and the audience realizes that this is the first dream he has ever had, as Pricklies do not dream. As he rushes outside, he learns that all of the Pricklies had the same dream. When they rush to find Nog, he is gone from his room.

This causes all the Pricklies, usually a somber and serious society, to laugh for three days straight. The book ends with a conclusion about the future of the Pricklie Kingdom, which is more joyful than they had been before.
