= Paulist Evangelization Ministries =

Catholic evangelizing organization

- Abbreviation: PEM
- Formation: July 1, 1977 Washington, DC, USA
- Purpose: Equip Catholics to share the Good News
- Headquarters: Washington, DC
- President: Reverend Frank DeSiano, CSP
- Parent organization: Paulist Fathers
- Website: http://www.pncea.org/

In 1977 the Missionary Society of St. Paul the Apostle (the Paulist Fathers) established the US "Paulist National Catholic Evangelization Association" with the stated mission of equipping Catholics to evangelize. As of 2009 the association is known as Paulist Evangelization Ministries.

== History ==
In 1977, Fr. Alvin A. Illig, CSP, established the Paulist National Catholic Evangelization Association as an apostolate arm of the Paulist Fathers. Illig served as the director from 1977 until his death in 1991. He was also the first Executive Director of the National Conference of Catholic Bishops’ Committee on Evangelization from 1977 to 1982. In 1983 Pope John Paul II awarded Illig with the Pro Ecclesia et Pontifice medal for his service to the Bishops’ Committee on Evangelization. During his time at PNCEA, Illig focused on evangelization to inactive Catholics and the Americans without religious affiliation.

In 2009, PNCEA became known as Paulist Evangelization Ministries (PEM).

== Resource programs ==
PEM provides programs and resources to Catholic (arch)dioceses, parishes, and individuals, to help them bring the good news of Jesus Christ to inactive Catholics and those with no church family. PEM staff members give presentations throughout the United States and serve as consultants to dioceses and parishes seeking to carry out the evangelizing mission of Christ.

=== Pathways in Faith ===
Pathways in Faith is an online resource for Directors of Faith Formation and RCIA Directors to provide catechumenal material in an easy-to-adapt way.

=== Awakening Faith – Reconnecting with Your Catholic Faith ===
Awakening Faith is about attracting inactive Catholics to the Church. It consists of six weekly small group sessions of conversations around the topics of spirituality, Jesus, the Holy Spirit, God's Mercy, the Mass, and the Church. The sessions include reflection, discussion, and prayer.

=== Paulist Prison ministries ===
Paulist Prison ministries was started in 1994 by Fr. Thomas Comber, CSP. It provides chaplains and volunteers ministering in correctional facilities with Bibles, newsletters (Let's Talk! and ¡Hablemos!), prayer cards, and other Catholic religious materials.

=== Best Practices for Parishes ===
BPP assesses the quality of seven dimensions of parish life using best practices statements from church documents, pastoral experiences, and ministry experts. The assessment results become the basis for action planning. The seven workbooks are Prayer and Worship, Catechesis, Evangelization, Justice and Charity, Stewardship, Family/Pastoral Care, and Community Building.

=== Catholic Faith Inventory ===
CFI is an online questionnaire with over 100 questions, each pertaining to a certain aspect of the Catholic Faith, to assess respondents' faith.

=== Disciples in Mission ===
Disciples in Mission is a three-year process comprising Sunday liturgies, small faith-sharing groups, catechesis, family activities, teen groups, planning, and follow –up activities to provide experience of Evangelization. Since 1996 over 4,500,000 Catholics in over 3,600 parishes across the United States have participated in Disciples in Mission.

=== ENVISION ===
ENVISION is a parish planning process that involves parishioners.

=== Evangelization Exchange ===
E-Exchange is a free electronic newsletter published 10 times per year. The newsletter provides evangelization leaders with information on new opportunities and resources, and emerging trends.

== See also ==
- Pallottines: Catholic Apostolate Center
