= Francis Asbury Baker =

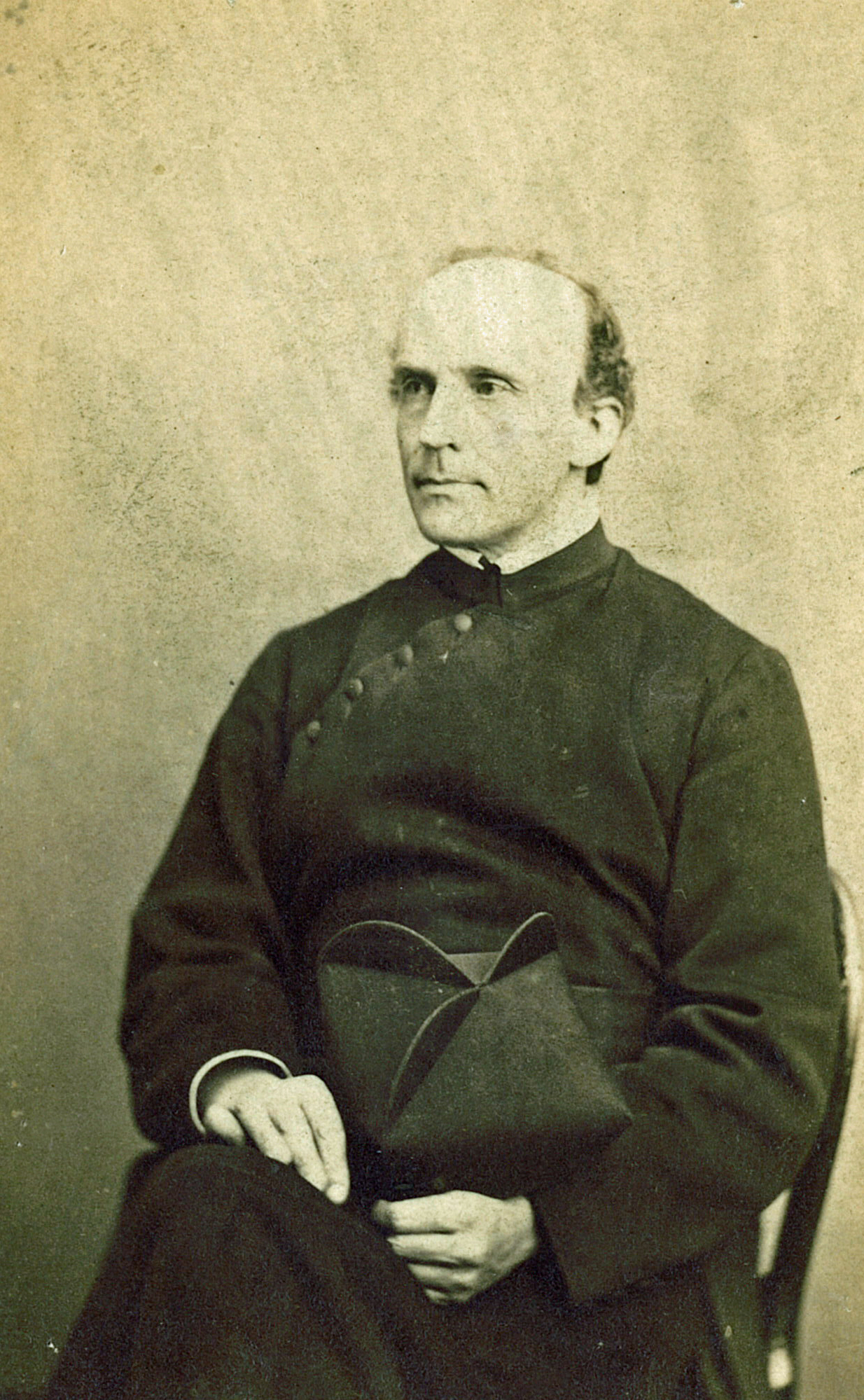
Father Francis Asbury Baker, CSP

Francis Asbury Baker (March 30, 1820 – April 4, 1865) was an American Catholic priest, missionary, and social worker, known as one of the founders of the Paulist Fathers in 1858.

== Life ==
Francis Asbury Baker was born in Baltimore, Maryland on March 30, 1820, the son Samuel Baker, a prominent physician and University of Maryland Professor of Medicine. His paternal grandfather, William Baker was a German immigrant; his paternal grandmother, a woman of Irish origin. William Baker was a successful merchant. His maternal grandfather, John Dickins, was an English Methodist preacher, who died in Philadelphia during a yellow fever outbreak. His maternal uncle was Secretary of the United States Senate, Asbury Dickins.

Dr. Baker was a great admirer of Francis Asbury, a popular Methodist bishop at that time, and named his son after his friend. Francis Baker graduated from Princeton University in 1839, and was ordained an Episcopal priest in 1846. He was assigned at first as an assistant at St. Paul's Episcopal Church (Baltimore, Maryland), and six years later was named rector of St. Luke's Church (Baltimore, Maryland), where he became known as an eloquent preacher.

Baker had great respect for the ideals held by John Henry Newman. His encounters with then Redemptorist Father Augustine Hewit and Archbishop Francis Patrick Kenrick of Baltimore as well as the intellectual ferment fostered by the Oxford Movement persuaded Baker to become Catholic in 1853, a conversion that created considerable stir at the time. He then changed his name to Francis Aloysius, in honor of Francis de Sales and St. Aloysius. He was ordained a Redemptorist Priest three years later. The Redemptorists presented week-long missions so that regular parish members and especially the poor could receive the religious instructions given by these traveling preachers.

Father Baker worked closely with Father Isaac Hecker on his missions and so after Hecker's expulsion from the Redemptorists and subsequent permission to found the Missionary Society of St. Paul the Apostle, granted by Pope Pius IX, Baker joined fellow missionaries Isaac Hecker, Augustine Hewit, Clarence Walworth, and George Deshon in leaving the Redemptorists to found the new society.

Father Baker divided his time as a Paulist between assisting at St. Paul the Apostle parish in New York City and giving missions throughout the eastern states. Baker was a zealous and effective missionary. The strain of both tasks took its toll on Baker's fragile health and as early as 1861 he was forced to slow his activities because of throat ailments. THis was further complicated by pneumonia. In early 1865 Baker contracted typhoid fever from his work with New York's poor and due in part to his already fragile health. He soon after died quietly surrounded by family and friends at the age of 45 just seven years after the founding of the Paulists.

He is buried at Old St. Patrick's Cathedral in New York.
