= Isaac Hecker =

American Catholic clergyman (1819–1888)

Servant of God Isaac Hecker CSP
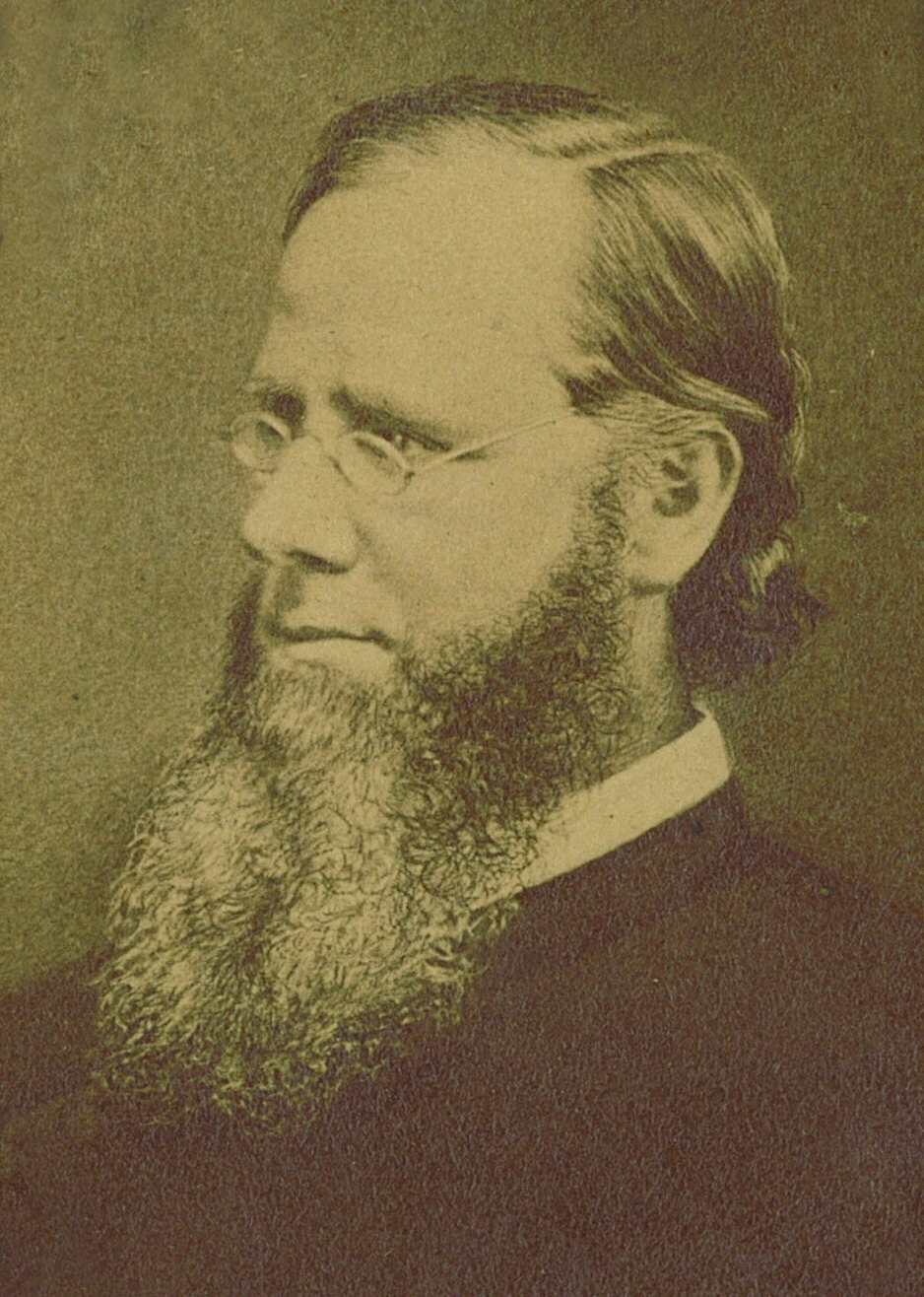

Orders
- Ordination: October 23, 1849 by Nicholas Wiseman

Personal details
- Born: December 18, 1819 New York City, US
- Died: December 22, 1888 (aged 69) New York City
- Denomination: Roman Catholic
- Parents: John Hecker and Caroline Freund
- Occupation: Roman Catholic priest, missionary, founder
- Education: Redemptorist House of Studies, Wittem, Netherlands

Isaac Thomas Hecker, CSP, (December 18, 1819 – December 22, 1888) was an American Catholic priest who founded the Paulist Fathers, a religious congregation for men.

Hecker originally entered the Redemptorists, by whom he was ordained a priest in 1849. After a dramatic expulsion from that congregation, with the blessing of Pope Pius IX, he founded the Missionary Society of St. Paul the Apostle, known as the Paulist Fathers, in New York on July 7, 1858. The Society was established to evangelize both believers and non-believers to convert America to the Catholic Church. Hecker sought to evangelize Americans using the popular means of his day, primarily preaching, the public lecture circuit, and the printing press. One of his more enduring publications is The Catholic World, which he created in 1865.

Hecker's spirituality centered on cultivating the action of the Holy Spirit within the soul as well as the necessity of being attuned to how the Lord prompts one in great and small moments in life. Hecker believed that the Catholic faith and American political culture of small government, property rights, civil society and liberal democracy were not opposed but could be reconciled. The ideas of individual freedom, community, service, and authority were fundamental to Hecker when conceiving how the Paulists would be governed and administered.

Hecker was a friend and colleague of classic liberal thinker Lord Acton in the cause of liberal Catholicism—opposed to ultramontanism politics in the church. Cardinal John Henry Newman likened Hecker's work to his own. In a letter written to Augustine Hewit on the occasion of Hecker's death, Newman wrote: "I have ever felt that there was a sort of unity in our lives, that we had both begun a work of the same kind, he in America and I in England."

Hecker's beatification process was opened January 25, 2008, in the mother church of the Paulist Fathers on 59th St, New York City, which earned him the title of a Servant of God.

== Background ==
=== Childhood ===
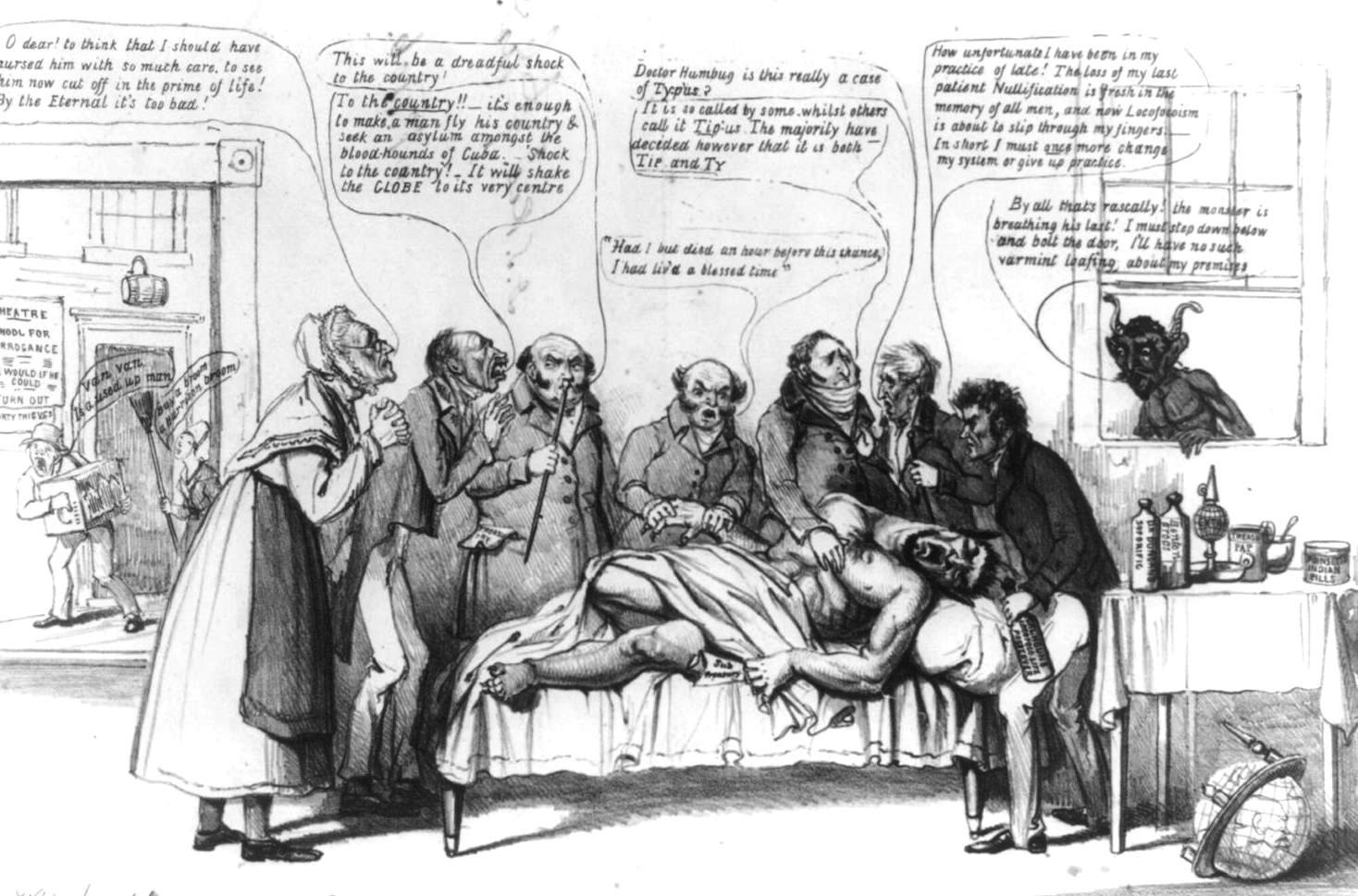
Cartoon celebrating demise of Locofocoism (1840)

Isaac Hecker was born in New York City on December 18, 1819. He was the third son and youngest child of German immigrants from the Kingdom of Prussia, John and Caroline (Freund) Hecker. The couple had one daughter and three sons. John Hecker was a metal worker who eventually started his own brass-forging business. Caroline, a devout Methodist, raised her children in that faith on the Lower East Side of Manhattan. In August 1822, at age three, Isaac contracted smallpox, a deadly disease at that time. When Caroline tried to explain the seriousness of his infection, Isaac replied that God would take care of him. He recovered, leaving only facial scars. Two years later, the elder John Hecker deserted the family, forcing the two older sons, John and George, to leave school and start a bakery business. Hecker would sometimes sit by the East River at night, trying to figure out what God had planned for him.

Hecker started grammar school at Ward School No. 7 in Manhattan in 1826. However, in 1831 the death of his maternal grandfather forced him to leave school to start working. He initially was apprenticed to Zion's Herald, a Methodist newspaper. However, he soon joined the family bakery. While kneading dough, he would read from a copy of Immanuel Kant's Critique of Pure Reason mounted on the wall. Hecker also pushed a cart around the neighborhood, delivering bread and other baked goods to their customers. In 1834, John and George made Isaac a partner in the bakery, which was expanding. Making his deliveries, Isaac became increasing upset with the abject poverty in the immigrant communities, the excesses of the wealthy and the corruption of public officials.

=== Teenage years ===
In 1834, 15-year-old Hecker attended a lecture in New York by Orestes Brownson, an American writer and philosopher. This would be the start of a long friendship between the two. Brownson believed that the unequal social distribution of wealth clashed with Christian principles. Hecker was deeply influenced by Brownson's teachings, as they appealed to religious feelings from his family upbringing. As a teenager, Hecker had stopped practicing Methodism, but was still thinking about God.

In 1835, Hecker and his brothers became involved in New York City politics. They joined the Democratic Party, becoming part of the Locofocos, a left-wing faction that opposed business monopolies. This put them in opposition to the Tammany Hall organization that ran the party. The Hecker brothers printed Locofoco handbills and posted them around the city. However, with the defeat of the Locofocos in the 1837 election, Hecker became disenchanted with politics. Hecker started looking for answers to questions in his life. He began reading works of the German philosophers of this period, including Immanuel Kant, Georg Wilhelm Friedrich Hegel and Johann Gottlieb Fichte.

=== Visits to communes ===
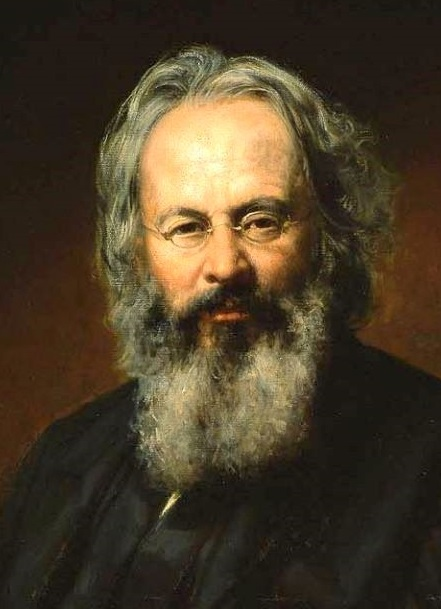
Orestes Brownson (1864)

After Hecker experienced a mystical vision of angel, he became less concerned with the bakery. Hecker started to worry about his sanity, wondering if God was communicating to him. He began experiencing physical ailments. Hecker visited Brownson in the Chelsea district in December 1842 to seek advice. At Brownson's suggestion, Hecker traveled to Roxbury, Massachusetts, to speak with the people at the transcendentalist commune Brook Farm. Founded in 1841 by the Unitarian minister George Ripley, it was a community of intellectuals, artists, farmers and tradespeople who taught courses and grew their own food. After spending a few days at Brook Farm, Hecker decided to stay there, paying five dollars a week as a boarder.

However, in June 1843, he left Brook Farm, having decided that it was not helping him with his spiritual goals. He traveled to Harvard, Massachusetts, to spend time at Fruitlands, a community founded by the author Amos Bronson Alcott. At this point, Hecker gained some inner peace by accepting that he could not understand his mystical feelings. He later wrote:

Brook Farm (1846)

‘What the Spirit may be is a question I cannot answer; what it leads me to do will be the only evidence of its character. I feel as impersonal as a stranger to it. I ask, ‘Who are you?’ ‘Where are you going to take me?”

=== Exploration of religious denominations ===
In August 1843, Hecker returned to New York City and resumed work at the bakery. After consulting with his brothers, it was agreed that Hecker would work for the bakery in the mornings, allowing him time in the afternoons to study and do more research. Hecker continued his correspondence with Brownson, with both men agree that organized religion was the best route for furthering social justice. Hecker wrote,

‘What the Spirit may be is a question I cannot answer; what it leads me to do will be the only evidence of its character. I feel as impersonal as a stranger to it. I ask, ‘Who are you?’ ‘Where are you going to take me?”

In the spring of 1844, Hecker was deciding whether to become an Episcopalian or a Catholic. He first met with Samuel Seabury, rector of the Episcopal Church of the Annunciation in Manhattan. Hecker then visited Bishop John Hughes of New York and asked about becoming a Catholic priest. Hughes told him he had to wait two years after his conversion, then gave Hecker a stern lecture about Protestantism. In May 1844, Hecker traveled to Concord, Massachusetts, to study Greek and Latin with the classicist George Partridge Bradford. Hecker rented a room in a house belonging to the mother of the essayist Henry David Thoreau. Hecker took frequent walks with Thoreau, at one point proposing that they travel to Europe together.

While in Concord, Hecker received a letter from Brownson saying that he was converting to Catholicism. He suggested that Hecker meet in Boston with John Bernard Fitzpatrick, the coadjutor bishop of the Diocese of Boston. At this time, Hecker began seriously considering his own conversion. Some of his transcendentalist friends, including Thoreau, Alcott and Ralph Waldo Emerson, questioned the move. However, Hecker's discussion with Fitzpatrick convinced him to become a Catholic. Fitzpatrick gave Hecker a letter to John McCloskey, then coadjutor bishop of New York; Hecker returned home to prepare for his baptism.

=== Conversion and ordination ===
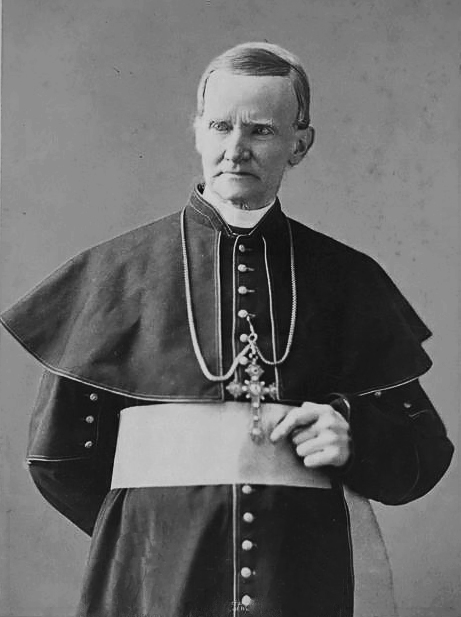
Cardinal McCloskey (1876)

On August 4, 1844, Hecker was baptized into the Catholic Church by McCloskey. Although McCloskey and Brownson advised Hecker to enter a seminary in the United States and become a diocesan priest, Hecker was thinking more about a religious order. He met two recent converts to Catholicism, Clarence Walworth and James McMaster, who were planning to join the Redemptorist Order. He decided to join them.

The three men sailed from New York to London on August 5, 1845, on the paddlewheel ship Prince Albert. Hecker's brothers, approving of his life choice, paid his shop passage. Arriving in England, the men spent three days in London. During their stay, Hecker had the opportunity to meet the English Catholic theologian John Henry Newman. The men then traveled to the Redemptorist novitiate at Sint-Truiden in Belgium. Most of the novices were Belgian or Dutch. The language of instruction was French, forcing Hecker to take a crash course on it. On October 16, 1846, Hecker took his vows as a Redemptorist. While at the novitiate, Hecker used his skills as a baker to bake bread for everyone, and he assisted in the stables.

The day after taking his vows, the Redemptorists sent Hecker to their house of studies at the Wittem Monastery in Witten, Netherlands to continue his preparation for the priesthood. Hecker was tasked with studying philosophy and Latin. Although his academic progress was slow, he was given his tonsure and allowed to take his minor vows after finishing his first year. In 1848, he moved to the Clapham district of London, where the Redemptorists were establishing the Our Immaculate Lady of Victories Parish. Hecker was ordained a Catholic priest for the Redemptorist Order on October 23, 1849, in London by Bishop Nicholas Wiseman.

=== Redemptorist priest ===
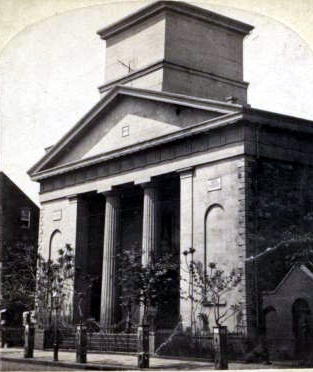
St. Joseph's Church, Greenwich Village (ca. 1860)

After Hecker's ordination in 1849, the Redemptorists assigned him as chaplain at Clapham. In 1851, the Redemptorists sent Hecker back to New York City to serve at Church of St. Joseph in Greenwich Village. Hecker was joined there by Walworth and two other American Redemptorist priests, Augustine Hewit and John Duffy.

The Redemptorist leaders sent Hecker and his priests to parishes in a mission band, designed to raise enthusiasm among the people. He soon proved very adept at bringing more people into the church. If attendance at a mission service was low, he would visit Catholics in their homes, urging them to come to church. While Hecker's band was in Johnstown, Pennsylvania, a man found deceased by the railroad tracks was brought by a large crowd to a local Catholic church. Hecker exhorted the crowd to come to the mission meetings. The next day, he rode around town, motivating people to attend. The mission was a great success. During a mission at Old St. Patrick's Cathedral in Manhattan, he and his colleagues brought 7,000 people into a service. In 1854, Hecker and the three other priests were invited to conduct missions at parishes in Mobile, Alabama, and New Orleans, Louisiana.

During his many missions, Hecker noted a significant number of Protestants attending his events. While in Norfolk, Virginia, in 1856, Hecker scheduled four evenings of talks about Catholicism for Protestants; the talks had high attendance. This led him to believe that, with the right approach, the Catholic church could convert most of the United States.

=== Expulsion from Redemptorist Order ===
Hecker published Questions of the Soul (1855), a book on religion that gained him a national reputation. In the book, Hecker argues that Protestantism had failed to meet the needs of those wanting spirituality and that the only alternative was Catholicism. Hecker and his colleagues arrived at the idea of creating an American, non-ethnic Redemptorist mission center aimed at the conversion of Protestants. They argued that disassociating it from foreign ethnic groups would allay some of the nativist backlashes then sweeping the nation. The plan was to start the mission in Newark, New Jersey, or New York City. However, many Redemptorists were not interested in converting Protestants. They felt the Order should devote its resources to the millions of poor European immigrants who would turn away from the Catholic Church if they were not supported.

In the summer of 1857, Hecker asked his superior, the Redemptorist Provincial George Ruland, for permission to present his proposal for an American mission to the Redemptorist General, Nicholas Mauron, in Rome. Rutland refused, but Hecker traveled there anyway, citing a bylaw in the Redemptorist constitution. Arriving on August 26, 1857, Hecker sought a meeting with Mauron. Hecker carried with him letters of support from Hughes and Bishop James Roosevelt Bayley of Newark.

However, Mauron believed that Hecker had violated the discipline of their order by coming to Rome. When Hecker arrived on August 29 at the Redemptorist center in Rome, he was met with a board of consultors. They were assembled by Mauron to examine Hecker's violation and exact a punishment. The board then expelled Hecker and his colleagues from the Redemptorists. During the meeting, an astonished Hecker reportedly fell to his knees and held his head low. Remaining in Rome for the next seven months, Hecker visited Mauron several times to express his lack of animosity.

== Founding of the Paulist Fathers ==
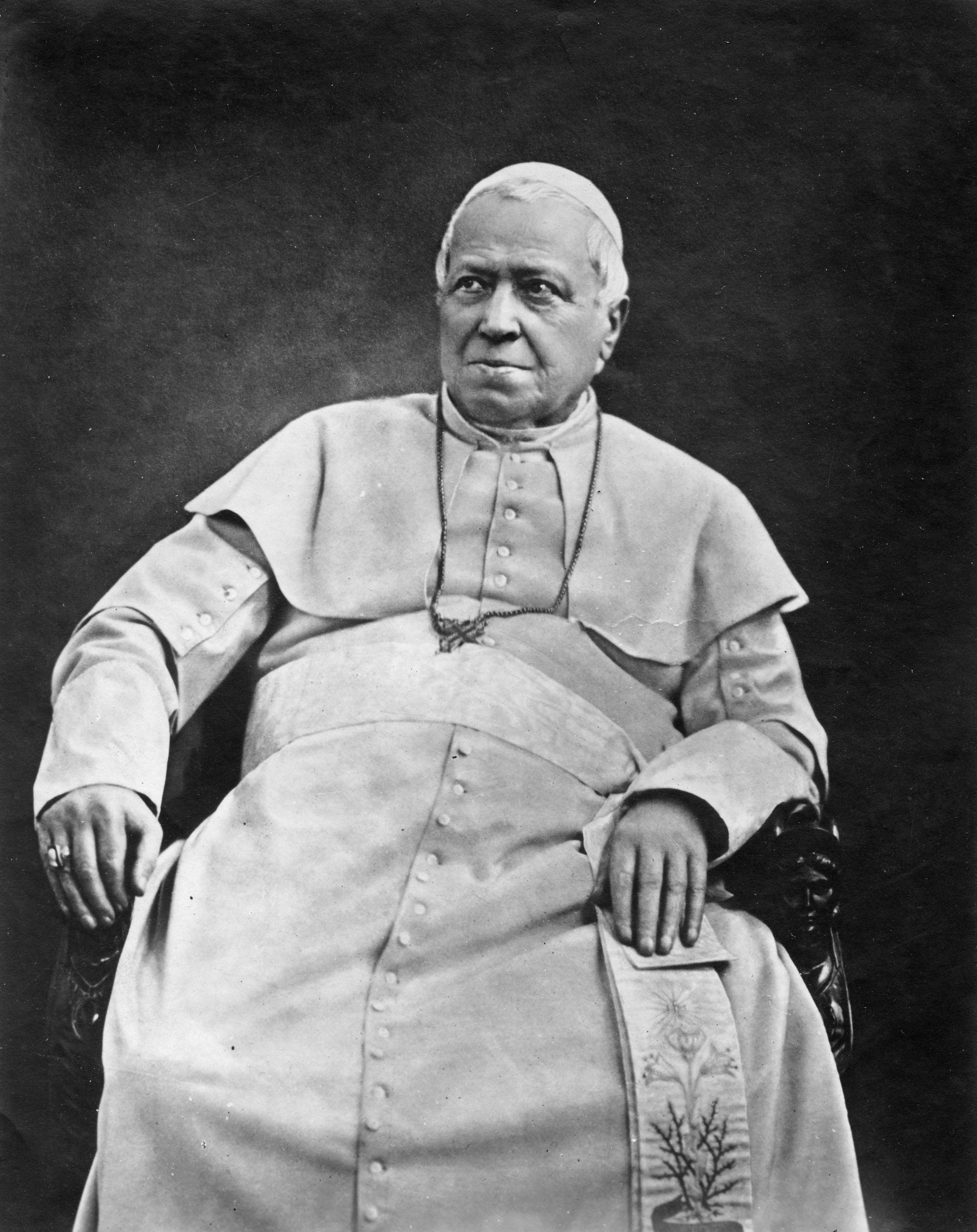
Pope Pius IX (1875)

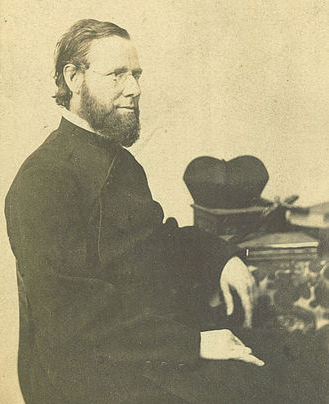
Hecker, circa 1860

=== Papal permission ===
After his expulsion from the Redemptorists, Hecker met with Cardinal Alessandro Barnabò, prefect of the Congregation Propaganda Fide. During this time, Hecker was receiving more letters of support from bishops in America, along with some from members of the Redemptorists. Sympathetic to Hecker's plans and impressed with his accomplishments, Barnabò arranged an audience for him with Pius IX. The pope annulled Hecker's expulsion order, then officially released him and his fellow priests from their vows to the Redemptorist Order.

At this point, Hecker decided that the best way to evangelize American protestants was to establish a new religious order that was committed to that goal. In 1858, Pius IX gave Hecker, George Deshon, Augustine Hewit, Francis Baker and Walworth, all former Redemptorists, permission to create a new religious order.

=== Establishment of order ===
Hecker returned to New York from Rome and gathered his American friends Hewit, Baker, and Deshon to plan their congregation. Archbishop Hughes accepted the priests into the archdiocese, giving them a frame building in Manhattan to serve as their base. They constructed the first Church of St. Paul the Apostle, along with a rectory, on that site in 1859. The priests decided to call themselves the "Missionary Priests of St. Paul the Apostle" and elected Hecker as their superior.

Between 1867 and 1869, Hecker embarked on a long lecture tour across the United States, delivering at least 56 lecture series. During one tour in the western states, he traveled over 4,500 miles and addressed over 30,000 people, most of whom were non-Catholic. Hecker's first biographer, the Paulist priest Walter Elliott, wrote:

"We can never forget how distinctly American was the impression of his personality. We heard the nation's greatest men then living. ...Father Hecker was so plainly a great man of this type, so evidently an outgrowth of our institutions, that he stamped American on every Catholic argument he proposed. ...Never was a man a more Catholic than Father Hecker, simply, calmly, joyfully, entirely Catholic."

In April 1865, Hecker launched The Catholic World, a monthly magazine for the Paulists. A year later, he founded the Catholic Publication Society to spread Catholic doctrine to non-Catholics. Today it is the Paulist Press. In 1870, he established The Young Catholic, a magazine for young boys and girls.

In 1869, Hecker attended the First Vatican Council in Rome, acting as a theologian for Bishop James Gibbons of North Carolina. While in Italy, Hecker visited the town of Assisi, the birthplace of Francis of Assisi. "Francis touched the chords of feeling and aspiration of the hearts of his time and organized them for united action," Hecker wrote in his journal.

=== Decline in health ===
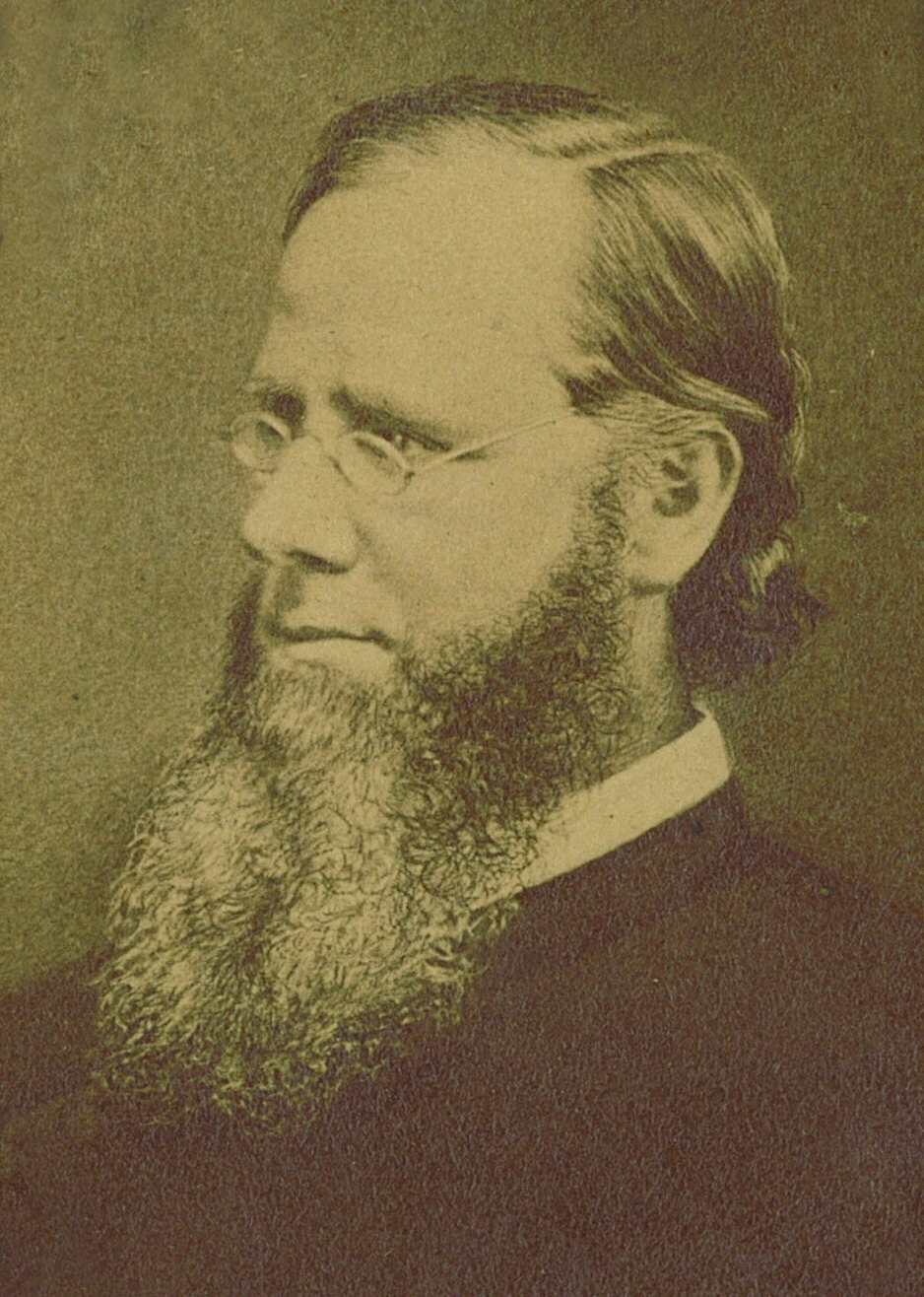
Isaac Hecker (1880s)

When the First Vatican Council ended in 1870, Hecker returned to the United States to continue his work. However, he was soon stricken with leukemia. By 1871, his failing health forced him to give up his roles with the Paulist Fathers. Hecker left for Europe seeking a cure; he told his Paulist brothers: "Look upon me as a dead man ... God is trying me severely in soul and body, and I must have the courage to suffer crucifixion".

Hecker traveled to spas in Europe, unsuccessfully seeking cures and relief from pain. During this time, he struggled with the strength of his faith. However, after spending the winter of 1873 to 1874 in Egypt on a boat on the Nile River, Hecker felt rejuvenated, writing;

"This trip has been in every respect much more to my benefit than my most sanguine expectations led me to hope. It seems to me almost like an inspiration."

In 1875, Hecker returned to New York, where he resumed work for the Paulists on a limited basis. At this time, Hecker wrote an essay describing the work of the Holy Spirit in the renewal of both church and state. As his leukemia worsened, Hecker had moments when he worried that God had abandoned him. However, he was ultimately able to accept what he felt was God's direction for him. During the 1880s, Hecker health declined again, leaving him as an invalid for his last few years.

Hecker died on December 22, 1888, at the Paulist House in Manhattan. He was buried in the Church of St. Paul the Apostle in Manhattan.

== 19th century legacy ==
=== Hecker influence on Catholic liberals in France ===
After his death, Hecker's thoughts played a significant role in the rise of Catholic liberalism in Europe during the last decades of the 19th century. The epicenter of the liberal movement was in France. During the Franco-Prussian War of 1870 to 1871, after a military setback, the last king of France, Louis Napoleon, was forced to abdicate. His regime was replaced in 1870 by the French Third Republic. Reacting to the French defeat in 1871, the new French government worked to weaken the powers that supported the previous regime, including the Catholic Church. They passed stringent regulations on religious orders and Catholic education without much pushback from the general population.

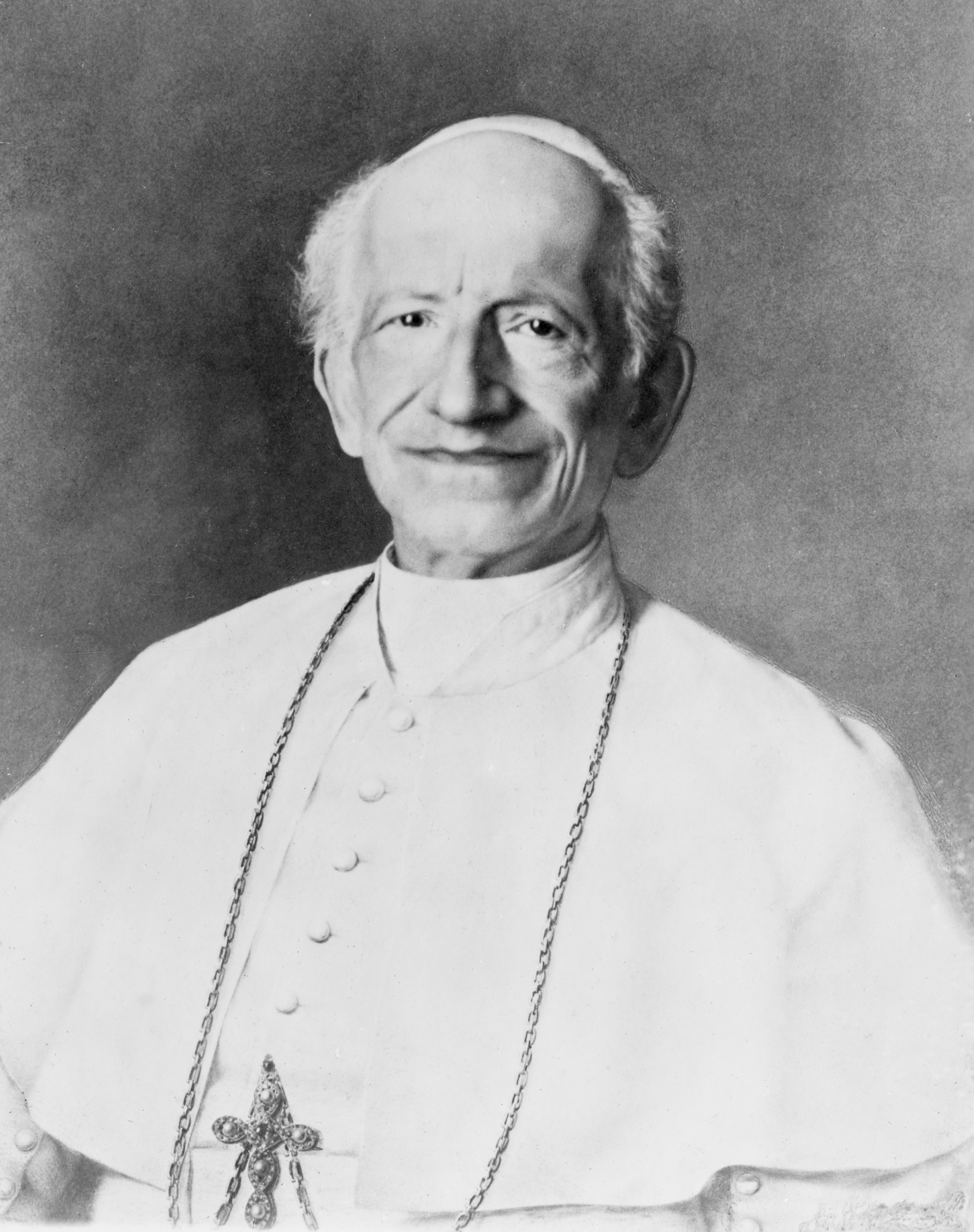
Pope Leo XIII (1898)

A group of French clerics, called the liberals, had been inspired by Hecker's background and work in the United States. They wanted the French church to accept the Third Republic and not become isolated. The liberals wanted the French church to embraced the intellectual life of France and work to improve the conditions of the poor. As used by Hecker in the United States, the liberals wanted the French church to form social movements and organize clubs for Catholics. They called for priests to involve themselves in social and philanthropic projects, establish closer relationships with their parishioners, and reward personal initiative among both clergy and laity.

Conservative Catholics were distrustful of all republics, including those in France and the United States. The liberal movement alarmed them; they viewed its tenets as symptoms of pernicious modernism. Conservatives believed that liberalism was breaking the divinely established distinction between the priest and the layman. In addition, it was giving the laity too much power in church affairs. They judged individual initiative as being incompatible with the fundamentals of Catholicism. They would refer to Hecker as the "The Yellow Dart."

=== Controversy on Hecker biography ===
In 1892, Pope Leo XIII, called on French Catholics to accept the Third Republic in France, which was by then 22 years old. This attempt at reconciliation with the French government created more unhappiness among conservatives.

The 1891 Hecker biography by Elliott was translated into French in 1897. The translator, Abbé Félix Klein, added controversial opinions about individualism and liberalism to the preface, inaccurately attributing them to Hecker. That same year, the French liberal movement received an impetus. William Henry O'Connell, a former rector of the Pontifical North American College in Rome, spoke in 1897 about Hecker's ideas at the Fourth International Catholic Scientific Congress in Fribourg, Switzerland.

Using the Hecker biography as ammunition, conservatives complained about the American liberals to Leo XIII. In 1898, Maignen wrote Le Père Hecker, est-il un saint? ("Is Father Hecker a Saint?"), a violent polemic against the new movement. Without reading any of Hecker's published works, Maignen accused him of subjectivism and crypto-Protestantism. Many powerful Vatican authorities, also opposed to Americanism, expressed their displeasure about Hecker to Leo XIII. The pope was reluctant to chastise American Catholics, whom he had often praised for their loyalty and faith. However, he could not ignore the conservative views.

To quiet the Americanism uproar, in February 1899, Leo XIII sent Cardinal James Gibbons of Baltimore the papal brief titled Testem Benevolentiae (Witness to Good Will). It condemned the following tendencies:

- Overemphasizing the role of interior initiative in one's spiritual life, which would lead to disobedience
- Attacking religious vows and disparaging the value of religious orders
- Minimizing Catholic doctrine
- Minimizing the importance of spiritual direction

Testem Benevolentiae did not accuse Hecker or the American bishops of being guilty of any of the four points. Instead, the brief merely stated that if such opinions did exist among the American clergy, the hierarchy needed to eradicate them. In response to Testem Benevolentiae, Gibbons and other American church leaders assured the pope that the opinions in the preface belonged to Klein, not Hecker or them. They stated that Hecker never promoted any deviation from, or minimization of, Catholic doctrines. The Hecker controversy gained very little attention among the laity or the majority of the clergy in the United States or Europe. Testem Benevolentiae did strengthen the conservative position in France, which was its main purpose.

When the church in America was struggling with the question of whether the assimilation of Catholics, many of whom were immigrants, into American culture would compromise their Catholic faith, Hecker saw no contradiction between being American and being Catholic. In a 2014 article in OSV Weekly, the journalist Russell Shaw wrote, "On the level of ideas, no one before or since has done more than Isaac Hecker did to promote Catholic assimilation into the secular culture of the United States."

== Modern legacy ==
- The Paulist Fathers give out the Spirit of Hecker Awards annually to men and women who assist in the Paulist mission and share Hecker's values.
- The Paulist Center in Boston bestows the Isaac Hecker Award for Social Justice to a Catholic from North America who makes a significant contribution to peace and justice. Past recipients have been the social activist Dorothy Day and the union organizer Cesar Chavez.
- The Paulist Fathers in 2022 opened Hecker House in Washington, D.C., a residence for Paulist seminarians and novices who are attending classes at the Catholic University of America.

== Veneration ==
On January 25, 2008, Archbishop Edward Egan of New York opened Hecker's cause for beatification. In 2023, the United States Conference of Catholic Bishops voted to advance his cause.

== Publications ==
- Questions of the Soul, New York: D. Appleton and Company, 1855.
- Aspirations of Nature, New York: James B. Kirker, 1857.

== See also ==
- Institutes of consecrated life

== Sources ==
- Behnke, John J. Isaac Thomas Becker: Spiritual Pilgrim. New York: Paulist Press
- Farina, John, An American Experience of God. New York: Paulist Press, 1981
- Farina, John, ed. Isaac Hecker, The Early Diary: Romantic Religion in Ante-bellum America. New York: Paulist Press, 1989
- Farina, John, Hecker Studies: Essays on the Thought of Isaac Hecker. New York: Paulist Press, 1983
- Hecker, Isaac, The Paulist Vocation. New York: Paulist Press, 2000
- Holden, Vincent F, Yankee Paul: Isaac Thomas Hecker. Milwaukee: Bruce Pub. Co, 1958
- Hostetter, Larry, The Ecclesial Dimension of Personal and Social Reform in the Writings of Isaac Thomas Hecker. Roman Catholic Studies 15. Lewistone, NY: Edwin Mellen Press, 2001
- O'Brien, David J., Isaac Hecker: An American Catholic. New York: Paulist Press, 1992
- McSorley, Joseph, Isaac Hecker and his Friends. New York: Paulist Press, 1972
- Robichaud, Paul, A Future Brighter Than Any Past. New York: Paulist Press. 2017
