= WLWL (New York City) =

Radio station in New York City (1925–1937)

WLWL was a noncommercial radio station in New York City. It was operated by the Paulist Fathers, with its main goal being "the spread of Catholic truth and culture". WLWL began broadcasting in September 1925, and was sold in 1937, becoming WBIL. WBIL in turn was deleted in 1939, as part of a consolidation that resulted in an upgrade for station WOV.

== History ==
=== WLWL ===
WLWL was first licensed on August 12, 1925 at 415 West Fifty-ninth Street in New York City. The owners were the Missionary Society of Saint Paul the Apostle, a Roman Catholic evangelical organization generally known as the "Paulist Fathers" or just "The Paulists". The WLWL call letters reportedly stood for the slogan "We Listen, We Learn". In early 1923, a band of frequencies had been reserved for use by high-powered "Class B" stations with quality programming, and WLWL was assigned to 1040 kHz (wavelength of 288.3 meters), one of the frequencies reserved for "Zone 1" in the northeastern United States. Costing about $200,000, WLWL began broadcasting on September 24, 1925, with a transmitter power of 1,000 watts. Its main focus was public service with cultural, educational, and religious programs. Programming included songs by the Premiere Male Quartet.

Although its original power of 1,000 watts was fairly strong for this era, the station quickly received a series of power boosts, rising to 1,500 watts before the end of the year, and to 3,500 watts in early 1926. Beginning in mid-1926, there was a period when adverse legal decisions led to the U.S. government temporarily losing its authority to assign transmitting frequencies. Taking advantage of this lapse, on October 10, 1926, WLWL moved to a frequency of 780 kHz (wavelength of 384 meters), which led to complaints about interference from stations WOR in Newark, New Jersey, which had remained on its 740 kHz assignment, and WRNY in New York City, which had made its own self-assignment, to 802 kHz. As of December 31, 1926, WLWL was reported to be using 5,000 watts on its self-assigned wavelength.

Following the restoration of government authority by the creation of the Federal Radio Commission (FRC), WLWL was assigned to 1020 kHz effective June 15, 1927, now at 1,000 watts and sharing time with WODA in Paterson, New Jersey. WLWL requested a change to 810 kHz, which was granted, originally as an even split of hours with WMCA. In December 1927, this was reduced to just 2 hours a day excepting Sundays. With the transmitter site moved to Kearney, New Jersey, the FRC approved use of 5,000 watts during hours that would not interfere with WDAF in Kansas City, which was also at 810 kHz.

On November 11, 1928, under the provisions of the FRC's General Order 40, WLWL was assigned to 1100 kHz, on a sharetime basis with WPG, a municipally owned Atlantic City, New Jersey station. As part of the equal distribution standards mandated by the Davis Amendment, each of five regions had been allocated eight high-powered "clear channel" frequencies, which were granted dominant and widespread nighttime coverage. 1100 kHz was one of the frequencies assigned to "Region 1", consisting of states in the northeastern United States.

Funding became a problem by 1929. A letter from Bishop Dunn, read at masses at the Church of St. Paul the Apostle on November 10, 1929, contained a plea for contributions to support WLWL. The letter emphasized the station's missionary work, including "bringing inspiration to shut-in Catholics". At the same time, November 17, 1929, was designated as a day for "cooperation of a material sort". Sources of funding for the station included a box in the clubhouse of Thomas Dongan Council, Knights of Columbus, in New York City. In 1933, voluntary contributions deposited in the box sometimes totaled $50 in three months.

In 1929, Washington State College sought have its radio station, KWSC, move to 1100 kHz and become that frequency's dominant station, which would have limited WLWL and WPG broadcasting during nighttime hours. Members of the FRC heard from members of the United States Senate and House of Representatives on both sides of the matter. New York's Senator Wagner argued that granting KWSC's application would effectively destroy WLWL.

The Hearst company expressed interest in buying WLWL in 1931, taking out a four-week option for that purpose. The trade publication Broadcasting reported, "Hearst is understood to be willing to pay $500,000 for it, should it be successful in procuring one-half time on the frequency". However, WLWL was unsuccessful in obtaining the additional hours. At the conclusion of a license renewal hearing, on March 4, 1932, the FRC specified that WLWL's hours of operation would normally be limited to 15 1/2 hours per week, plus some additional time on the holidays of Christmas day, New Year's Eve, and Good Friday.

Later in 1932, the America's Wage-Earners, Protective Conference of Newark applied to the FRC to obtain WLWL's facilities and to be allowed to construct a new station with 5,000 watts power. At the same time, WLWL applied to move to 810 kHz with "specified hours", which was amended on January 16, 1933, to request unlimited time. WLWL superseded that application on June 3, 1933, now requesting an increase in operation on 1100 kHz to unlimited time. A hearing was held on September 6, 1933, and on February 9, 1934, the Commission entered its order effective February 16, 1934, denying that application.

WLWL continued to make unsuccessful attempts to gain fulltime operation, which ultimately involved proposed reassignments affecting eight stations on five clear channels. After two years of reviewing a proposal that was modified numerous times, on November 20, 1936, the FCC denied the requests in full.

=== WBIL ===
Unable to obtain the increased hours that would have made the station suitable for adding commercial operations, increasing costs caused the Paulist Fathers to sell WLWL to watch manufacturer Arde Bulova. By May 1937, Cardinal Hayes and the Diocesan Consultors of New York had approved the sale of the station for $275,000, as had the Federal Communications Commission. WLWL ceased operation in June, and on June 17 the station call letters were changed to WBIL.

WBIL, along with WPG, was shut down in 1939, when these two stations were eliminated as part of a consolidation that resulted in an upgraded WOV.
