= The Catholic World =

Catholic World
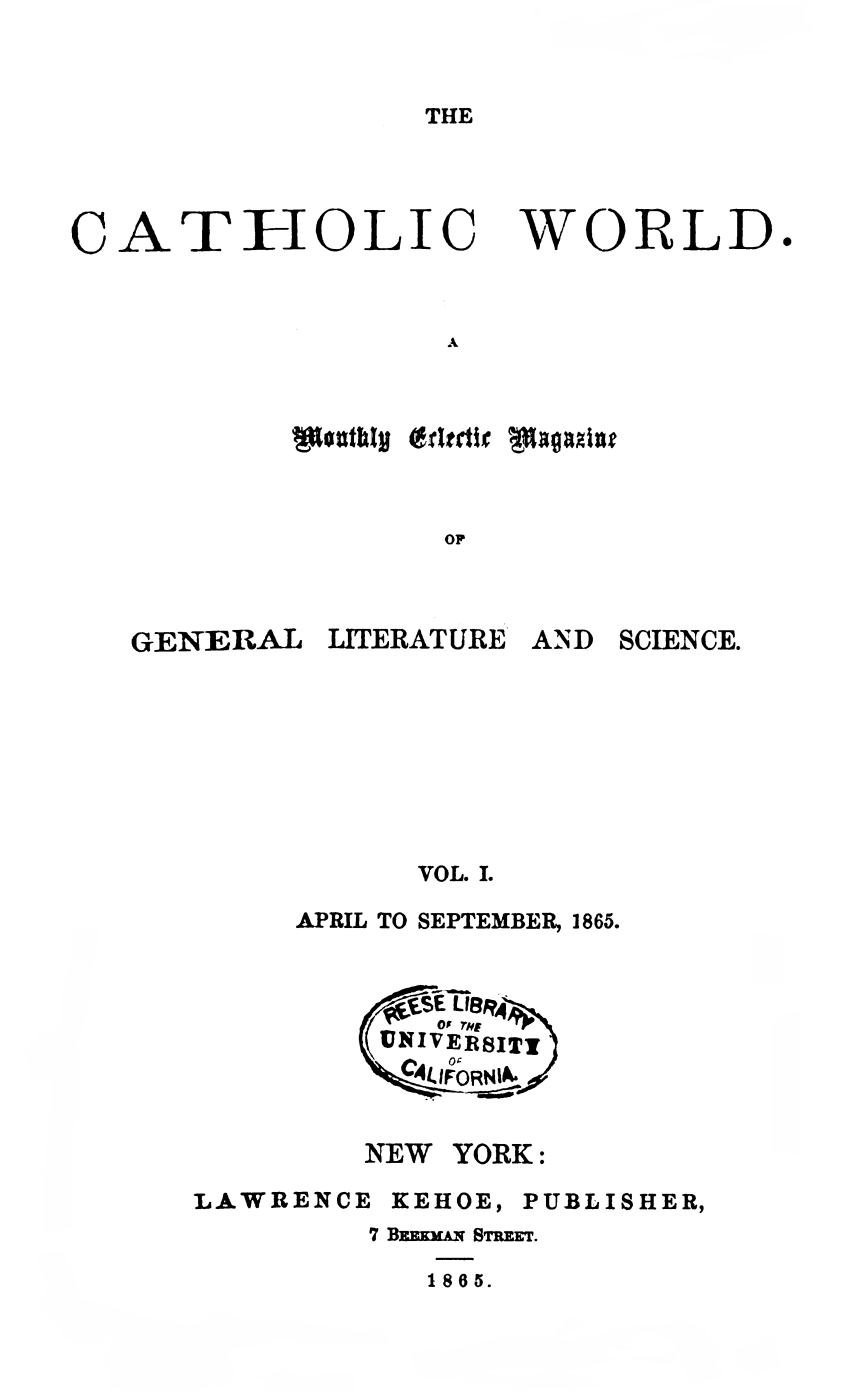
- Title page of the first edition.
- Categories: Christianity
- Frequency: Monthly
- First issue: April 1865
- Final issue Number: Jan/Feb 1996; Vol. 239, No. 1429
- Company: Paulist Fathers
- Country: United States
- Language: English
- ISSN: 1042-3494

The Catholic World was an American periodical founded by Paulist Father Isaac Thomas Hecker in April 1865. It was published by the Paulist Fathers for over a century. According to Paulist Press, Hecker "wanted to create an intellectual journal for a growing Catholic population, and insisted that it be a first-class publication in format, quality, and style, equal if not superior to any secular magazine in the country."

Early issues featured many articles by Orestes Brownson, including the May 1870 essay "Church and State", which described Brownson's understanding of the proper relationship between the Church and the state.

In the twentieth century, the magazine included commentary on political and religious events of the day, as well as fiction and poetry by Catholic writers. The magazine was renamed New Catholic World in 1972, but reverted to its original title in 1989. It ceased publication in 1996.

== See also ==
- Donahoe's Magazine
- Irish American journalism
- List of theological journals
