= Hewitt (name) =

Hewitt is both an English surname and a given name. Notable people with the name include:

== Surname ==
- Hewitt (surname)

== Given name ==
- Hewitt Bostock (1864–1930), Canadian publisher, businessman and politician
- Hewitt Bouanchaud (1887–1950), Lieutenant Governor of Louisiana
- Hewitt Crane (1927–2008), American engineer

== Fictional characters ==
- Harry Hewitt (Coronation Street), on the soap opera Coronation Street, portrayed by Ivan Beavis
- Concepta Hewitt (née Riley, later Regan), also of Coronation Street, portrayed by Doreen Keogh
- Lucille Hewitt, also of Coronation Street, portrayed by Jennifer Moss
- Christopher Hewitt, also of Coronation Street, portrayed by Victoria Baker as an infant and Stephen Ward as a child
- Christine Hewitt, on the soap opera EastEnders, portrayed by Elizabeth Power
- Jonathan Hewitt, also of EastEnders, portrayed by Jonny Lee Miller
- Thomas Hewitt, Leatherface

== See also ==
- Hewit, surname
