= Robert Hewat =

New Zealand cricketer (1863–1953)

Personal information
- Born: 18 October 1863; Oamaru, North Otago, New Zealand
- Died: 17 November 1953 (aged 90); Oamaru, North Otago, New Zealand
- Relatives: David Hewat (brother)

Domestic team information
- Years: Team
- 1889/90: Otago
- Only FC: 14 February 1890 Otago v New South Wales
- Source: CricketArchive, 28 February 2024

Robert Hewat (18 October 1863 – 17 November 1953) was a New Zealand cricketer. He played a single first-class match for Otago during the 1889–90 season.

Hewat was born in Oamaru in Otago in 1863 and was educated at Oamaru High School. He worked as an accountant. He was part of an Otago team of 22 that played against the touring Australians at Carisbrook in Dunedin in November 1886, before playing his only first-class match against a touring New South Wales team in February 1890. He recorded a pair and took one wicket during the match.

Hewat also played for North Otago between 1895 and 1904. In the 1900–01 North Otago Cricket Association season, while playing for Oamaru A, he led the batting and bowling averages and aggregates, with 187 runs at an average of 23.37 and 48 wickets at an average of 2.9.

Hewat married Alice Mary Colwell Little in Dunedin in December 1892. He died in Oamaru in 1953 at the age of 90. Two of his brothers, Thomas and David Hewat, played cricket for Oamaru, with David going on to make four first-class appearances for Wellington during the 1880s.
