= David Hewat =

New Zealand cricketer

Personal information
- Full name: David Falconer Hewat
- Born: 23 January 1866; Oamaru, North Otago, New Zealand
- Died: 2 February 1959 (aged 93); Wellington, New Zealand
- Bowling: Fast
- Role: Bowler
- Relatives: Robert Hewat (brother)

Domestic team information
- Years: Team
- 1887/88–1889/90: Wellington

Career statistics
Competition	First-class
Matches	4
Runs scored	18
Batting average	3.60
100s/50s	0/0
Top score	12
Balls bowled	556
Wickets	27
Bowling average	8.22
5 wickets in innings	3
10 wickets in match	0
Best bowling	7/30
Catches/stumpings	1/–
- Source: CricketArchive, 3 May 2019

David Falconer Hewat (23 January 1866 – 2 February 1959) was a New Zealand cricketer who played four matches of first-class cricket for Wellington between 1887 and 1890.

Hewat was a fast bowler. His best first-class figures were 7 for 30 against Hawke's Bay in 1887–88. Two days later, playing for a Wellington XXII against the touring English team, he took 5 for 44, all bowled, including the first three batsmen for four runs. Earlier in the same season, on his first-class debut, he had taken 6 for 25, bowling unchanged through the innings, against Nelson.
