= Nathaniel Hewit =

American clergy

Nathaniel Hewit (1788-1867) was an American clergyman.

== Early life and education ==
Hewit, the son of Nathaniel and Sarah (Avery) Hewit, was born in New London, Conn., on August 28, 1788.

He graduated from Yale College in 1808. He commenced a course of legal studies in the office of Hon. Lyman Law, of New London, but soon altered his plans. He then taught in the Academy at Plainfield, Conn., and there studied theology with Rev. Joel Benedict, D. D.

== Career ==
He was licensed to preach by the New London County Association, Sept. 24, 1811, and supplied several congregations in Vermont and elsewhere. After about six months at the Andover Theological Seminary, in the class of 1814, he was ordained Pastor of the Presbyterian Church in Plattsburg, N. Y., July 5, 1815, and dismissed Oct. 2,1817, being driven southward by the severity of the climate. In Jan. 1818. he was installed over the First Congregational Church in Fairfield, Conn., as successor of Rev. Dr. Heman Humphrey. While in this charge, he became prominent as an able Temperance advocate, and in 1827 he labored extensively in behalf of the American Temperance Society, formed the year before in Boston. In Nov., he was appointed to a three years mission for this Society, and was accordingly dismissed from his pastorate, Dec. 18. His successful efforts during this time, well entitled him to be called the "Luther of the early Temperance Reformation." Dec. 1, 1830, he was installed over the Second Congregational Church in Bridgeport, Conn., a parish adjacent to his former one. The summer of 1831 was spent in England, on the errand of the Temperance Reform. In 1833, Dr. Hewit (he received the degree of D. D. from Amherst in 1830) was prominent among the founders of the East Windsor Theological Institute, now the Hartford Seminary. In 1853, a difference in his Society, in regard to the course to be taken in procuring assistance for the pastor, resulted in his withdrawal, and the formation of an Old School Presbyterian Church over which he was installed Oct. 31. Here he continued preaching until a colleague was settled, about five years ago.

== Personal life ==
His first wife, Rebecca Woolsey, daughter of Hon. James Hillhouse, of New Haven, died Jan. 4, 1831, after 14 years of marriage; ten months later he married his second wife, Miss Susan Eliot, daughter of Rev. Andrew Eliot, of Fairfield. She died May 1, 1857. Of seven children, two sons and a daughter by his first wife survived him.

He died in Bridgeport, Conn. on February 3, 1867, aged 78 years. The discourse preached at his funeral, by Prof. Lyman H. Atwater, D. D., was published.

His letters are held at the New Haven Colony Historical Society.
