= George Deshon =

George Deshon

George Deshon (New London, Connecticut, U.S.A., 30 January 1823 – New York City, 30 December 1903) was an American Paulist Father.

== Life ==
Deshon was born in New London, Connecticut, a descendant of Plymouth Colony elder William Brewster. He was raised a Congregationalist and received an appointment to the United States Military Academy at West Point at the age of sixteen. His classmate and roommate was General U. S. Grant, with whom he remained friends. Some time after Grant's death, the New York Freeman asked Deshon to compose some reminiscences of their time together as cadets.

Deshon graduated in 1843 second in his class, and he afterwards taught geography, history and ethics at the Academy. While there he became friends with William Rosecrans, who was also teaching there. Rosecrans' conversion to Catholicism in 1845 influenced Deshon's own decision.

Deshon was promoted to the rank of first lieutenant in July 1851 and served with the Ordinance Department in Baltimore, Maryland, but resigned his commission in October. He was received into the Catholic Church in 1852, and soon after became a novice in the Redemptorist Order. He was ordained priest in 1855 and became associated with Isaac Hecker, Clarence Walworth, Augustine Hewit, and Francis A. Baker, all regularly employed in missionary work. With them he obtained in 1858 a dispensation from his vows as a Redemptorist, and assisted in the formation of a new Society of Apostolic Life called the Missionary Society of St. Paul the Apostle; the first house and church of the society were built in New York in 1859.

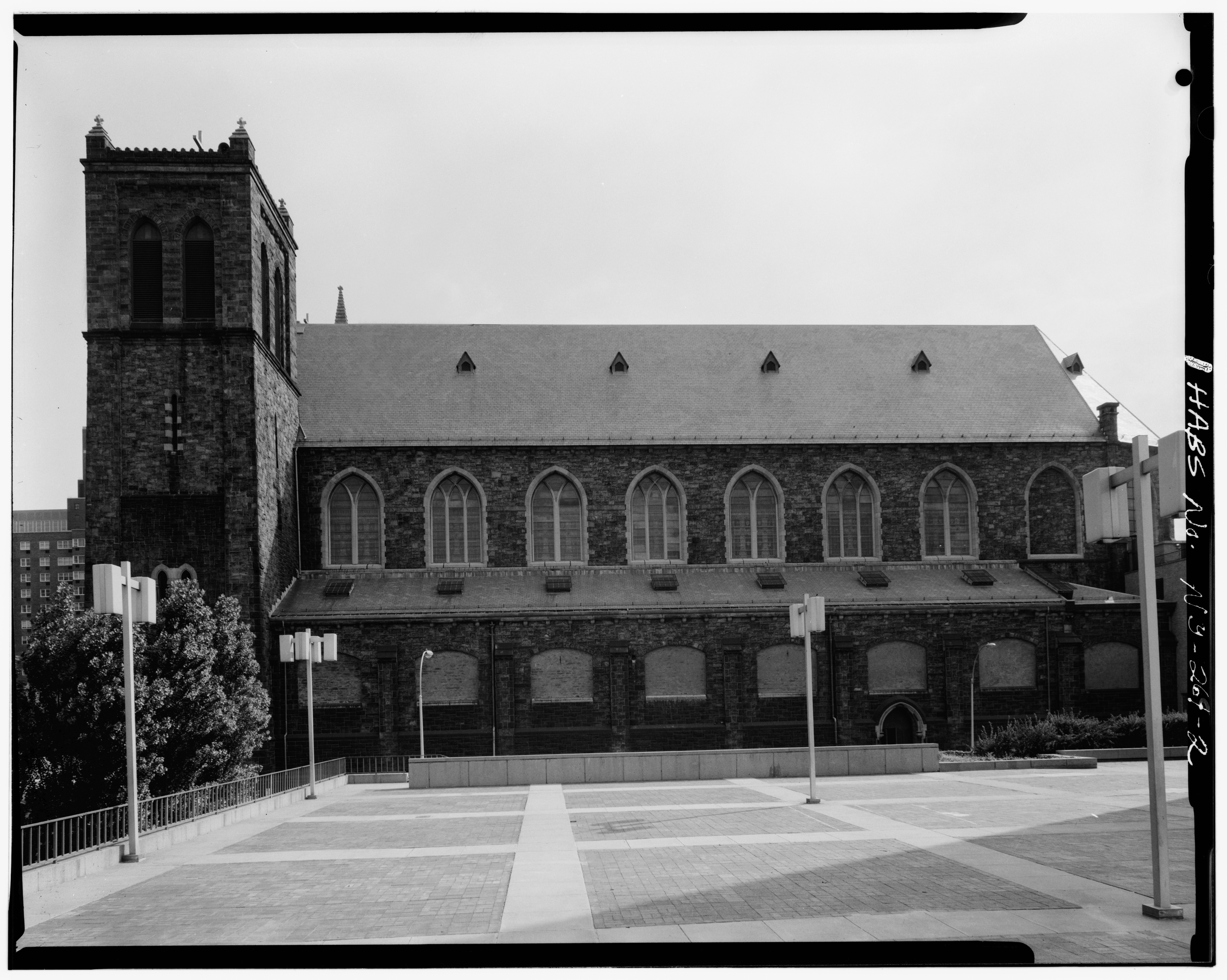
NORTH ELEVATION - Church of St. Paul the Apostle, Fifty-ninth Street and Ninth Avenue, New York, NY

He remained in this house during the rest of this life, being novice-master for several years, and afterwards assistant superior and in charge generally of the temporal interests of the community, which owed much to his business ability. He also superintended throughout the building of the Church of St. Paul the Apostle, in which his skill and knowledge as an engineer, acquired at West Point, were of service. The cornerstone was laid in 1876; around 1882, Deshon took over the project from architect Jeremiah O'Rourke. "The exterior was so forbidding that the Paulists called it Fort Deshon."

Deshon spent a considerable part of his time on the missions. A volume of his parochial sermons was issued in 1901. He published in 1860 a book entitled Guide for Catholic Young Women – Especially Those Who Earn Their Own Living, which is still in print today.

Deshon was elected superior general of the Paulist Institute in 1897. At that time houses had been founded in San Francisco, and at Winchester, Tennessee.

The last important act of his life was the founding of the Paulist house in Chicago, for which he arranged with Archbishop Quigley in the fall of 1903. Deshon died suddenly of heart failure about midnight 30 December 1903.

== See also ==
- Institutes of consecrated life

== Sources ==
- Searle, The Very Rev. George Deshon, C.S.P., in The Catholic World (1904), LXXXVIII, 569-73.

See also contemporary files, The Catholic News (New York).

Attribution
