= Paulist Fathers =

Roman Catholic society of apostolic life

Missionary Society of Saint Paul the Apostle
- Societas Sacerdotum Missionariorum a Sancto Paulo Apostolo
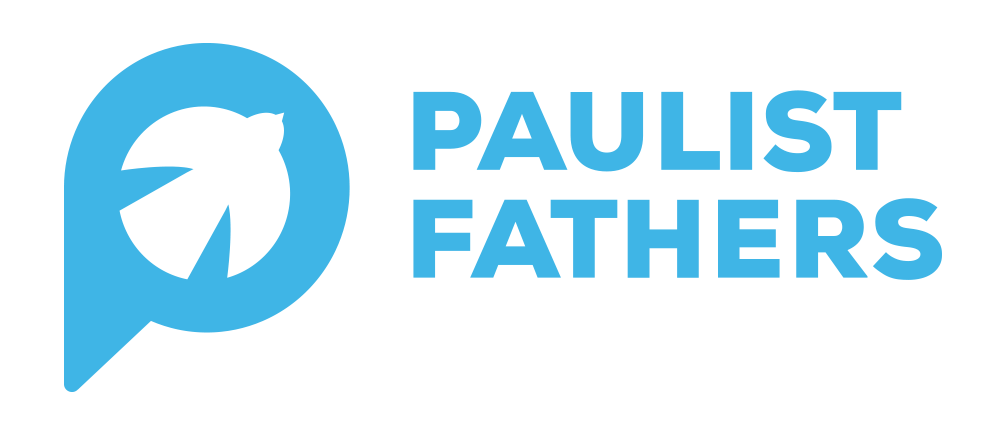
- Abbreviation: CSP
- Nickname: Paulist Fathers
- Formation: July 7, 1858; 168 years ago
- Founder: Isaac Thomas Hecker, CSP
- Founded at: New York City, New York, US
- Type: Society of apostolic life of Pontifical Right for men
- Headquarters: Motherhouse: 415 West 59th Street, New York, NY, USA
- Region served: North America
- Members: 101 (six seminarians and one novice) as of 2024
- Ministries: Missionary, ecumenical, pastoral work, Media, Arts
- President: Rene I. Constanza, CSP
- Parent organization: Catholic Church
- Website: paulist.org

The Paulist Fathers, better known as the Paulists and officially named the Missionary Society of Saint Paul the Apostle (Latin: Societas Sacerdotum Missionariorum a Sancto Paulo Apostolo) is a Catholic society of apostolic life of pontifical right, for men, founded in New York City in 1858 by Isaac Hecker in collaboration with George Deshon, Augustine Hewit, and Francis A. Baker. Its members use the postnominal letters CSP (Congregation of Saint Paul).

The society's mission is to evangelize—preach the gospel or give information with the intention of converting people to Catholicism—the people of North America in a manner suited to the continent's culture.

== History ==
=== Hecker and the early years ===
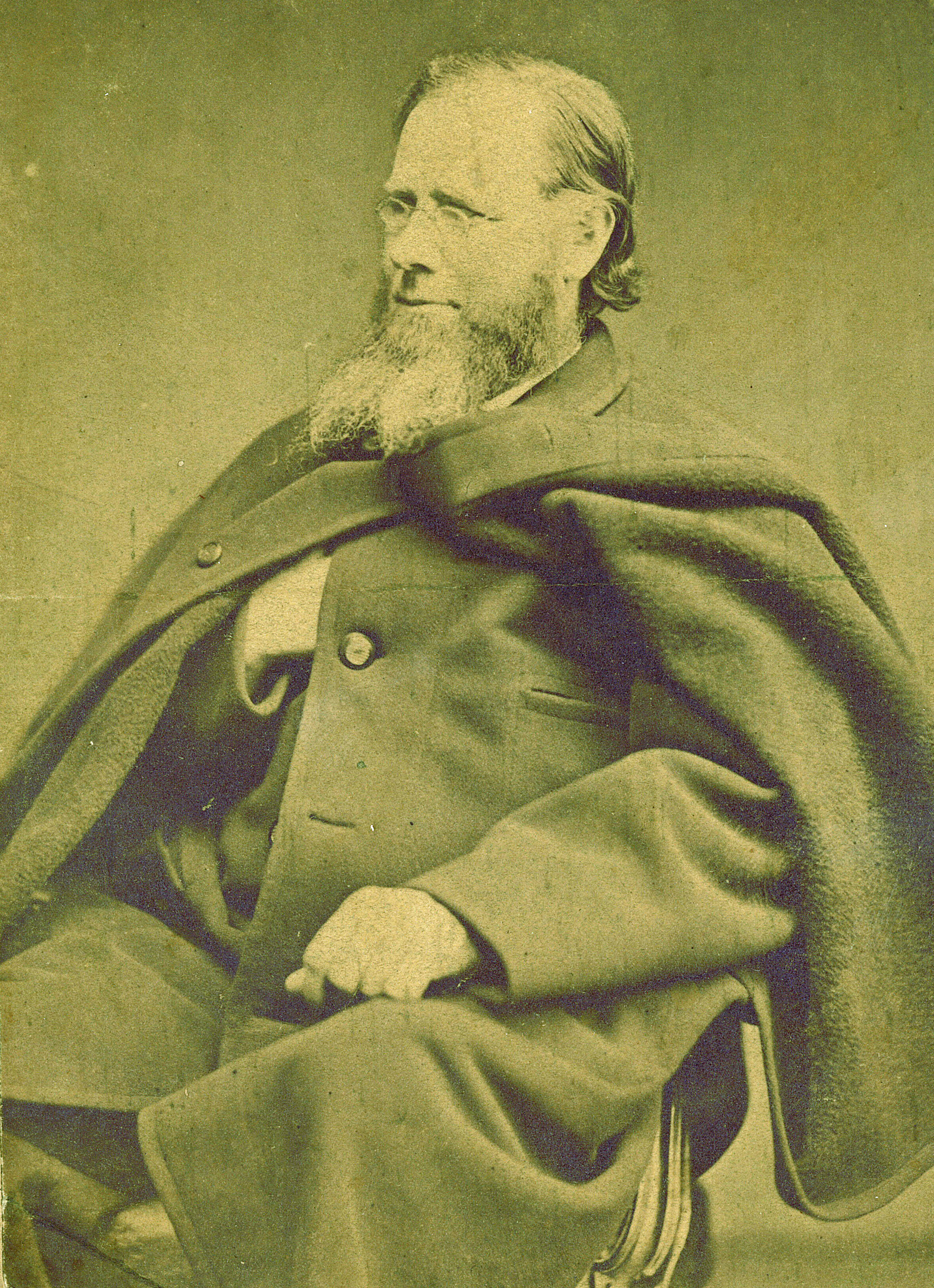
Founder Isaac Hecker, circa 1887

Isaac Hecker was a priest of the Congregation of the Most Holy Redeemer (Redemptorists), as were all the founding members of the Paulists. Following their conversion to Catholicism, they wanted to create an institute of priests that could evangelize the people of North America in ways that would be more effective than previous methods. Hecker advocated using the popular means of his day, primarily preaching, the public lecture circuit, and the printing press. Hecker's zeal was fueled by his conviction of the insufficiency of Protestantism. He considered it prophetically inevitable that the people of the United States would convert to the Catholic Church and a new Catholic civilization would begin.

Meanwhile, a misunderstanding had arisen between the American Redemptorists and their superiors. In order to seek a final and authoritative settlement of the difficulty, Hecker went to Rome as the representative of the American Fathers, to lay their case before the superior general of the order. Upon his arrival, he found the general and his council extremely hostile, and on the third day he was expelled from the order.

Hecker was supported by Redemptorist Fathers George Deshon, Augustine Hewit, Francis Baker, and Clarence Walworth, who were themselves converts to Catholicism from the Episcopal Church and were influenced significantly by the Oxford Movement. Hecker and his companions were soon after dispensed from their Redemptorist vows and were granted permission to found the Paulist Fathers in 1858 as the Missionary Priests of Saint Paul the Apostle, in honor of Paul of Tarsus, by Pope Pius IX.

Hecker received letters from the Propaganda Fide, strongly recommending him and his associates to the bishops of the United States. The Paulists got their start in the Archdiocese of New York, establishing their headquarters in a parish on 59th Street appropriately named Church of St. Paul the Apostle, granted them by John Hughes. Hecker conceived the Paulists to be a small community with a specific missionary focus. From their headquarters in New York City, at Hecker's insistence, they began their task of performing missionary work to non-Catholics.

Hecker and the first Paulists specifically targeted Protestant Christians in his ministry. Hecker toured cities like Norfolk, Jersey City, St. Louis, Dayton, Columbus, Chicago and Detroit, whereafter he returned to New York City. In New York, nearly 30,000 people came to hear Hecker preach about the Catholic faith, over two-thirds of whom were not Catholic. Despite these efforts, the work yielded few converts.

In 1865 Hecker started the "Catholic World" magazine, then the only Catholic monthly in the country. In 1866, the Catholic Publication Society was created, adding the written word to the Paulist mission. In 1870, a magazine for Catholic youth, The Young Catholic, was also created. Around this time, the Paulists began inviting Protestants to their mother Church, the Church of St. Paul the Apostle. Knowing that Catholics were often suspected of being anti-American, Hecker saw that the Church's design would "merge the best of American art and architecture within a Catholic house of worship," including the art of John La Farge -- himself the father of a Jesuit Priest.

In 1875, the first Paulist missionaries set sail for California; other missions quickly followed in Chicago, Illinois; Winchester, Tennessee; and Austin, Texas. and in Rhode Island, Kentucky, Michigan, and as far north as Quebec.

=== Challenges, changes, and Americanism ===
After the death of Isaac Hecker, Father Walter Elliot, Hecker's former secretary, sought to follow in the Paulist Founder's footsteps. He sought to re-create the public lectures that Hecker had given. Elliot secured contracts with bishops in dioceses across the United States trying to evangelize non-Catholics. Unlike Hecker, however, who had hoped to stir sentiments of devotion in his listeners, Elliot focused more on training evangelists and taking a more defensive stance on the Catholic faith. Elliot sought "convert makers rather than converts." Yet, like his predecessor, he also found little success. Meanwhile, the Paulist mission shifted slightly to being directed more at Catholics. While Paulist fathers still insisted that diocesan bishops, when approving their missions, grant them extra time to evangelize to non-Catholics, by 1908, their mission had shifted more towards campus ministry and parishes in densely populated areas with more Catholics.

Around the same time, the leadership of the Paulist fathers had fallen into turmoil. The Paulist Fathers had been caught up in the Americanist controversy. At the turn of the 20th century, multiple professors, including Paulist priests, had turned the Paulist St. Thomas seminary in Washington, D.C. "into a well-known center of progressive and modernist Catholicism." Professors like Father William L. Sullivan, Joseph McSorley, and James Joseph Fox were known for their enthusiasm regarding liberal novel theological ideas in the Catholic Church. Sullivan, for example, heartily promoted a historical-critical view of the church rather than a dogmatic one: "Sullivan urged students 'not to depend upon the texts of Scripture for Christ and His work, but rather from history and what has resulted from His coming.'" Sullivan also promoted the view that one's conscience supersedes that of even Church directives and community rule over the soul. Fox believed that neo-Thomist views were insufficient to modern people and that "modern errors" necessitated the use of "modern answers." McSorley wrote in support of liberal theologians like Jesuit George Tyrrell.

By 1909, however, all three of the men would be gone from the Paulist seminary in light of the Vatican's actions to suppress the liberal theology of what was called Americanism and Modernism. Sullivan would leave the Catholic church outright and become a Unitarian. In light of the negative publicity the Paulist Fathers received for being suspected of heresy, some of the Paulists sought to orchestrate a leadership change in their order and worked to create strategic voting blocks within their order during their next leadership election. After multiple groups within the order conspired against one another to vote a certain way, accusations that improper conduct were levied. Canon lawyers were brought in and interviewed several Paulists. After much commotion, John Hughes and Walter Elliot were elected superior and first consultor, respectively. Modernism and accusations of heresy from within its own ranks would continue to plague the order for the next 30 years.

=== Through the Second Vatican Council ===
Despite the challenges the order faced, they continued to operate in a missionary spirit. In 1925, they established WLWL, their own radio station in New York. Around 1935, the Paulists outfitted motor trailers as chapels and began a series of missions to rural areas such in states such as South Carolina, Tennessee and Utah.

In the 1940s and 50s, the Paulist Fathers began to shift their focus to support those inquiring of the faith. They build curricula and programs in parishes that would lead those interested in the faith on a course of study of the teachings of the Catholic Church. However, due to the lack of co-operation between the parish clergy and the Paulist fathers, these programs would often be abandoned by the parish priests after the Paulists completed their mission. To remedy this, the Paulist Fathers began opening "Catholic Information Centers," which operated as independent spaces in urban areas where inquirers of the faith would come to learn about the Church. These centers were designed to be open to the public and to be welcoming to non-Catholics. With the Second Vatican Council's promulgation of the Rite of Christian Initiation for Adults, which took place in parishes rather than off-parish centers, the Catholic Information Centers declined.

After the Second Vatican Council, Paulist Father Allen Ilvig led the order to renew its commitment to evangelizing the non-Catholics and non-Churched people of the United States. Relying on Pope Paul VI's Apostolic Exhortation Evangelii nuntiandi, Ilvig helped the Paulists create programs and guides to empower lay people and parishes to evangelize others in the charism of the Paulist Fathers. Ilvig's work was influential and was a cause of the order reaffirming evangelism as one of their core charisms in the late 1980s and in 1990.

=== Modern era ===
Paulists at work

The Paulist Fathers operate or support various ventures for their mission. The Paulist Press, based in Mahwah, New Jersey, is a well-established publisher of hardcover and paperback books, audio and visual tapes, DVDs, and educational materials and resources for parishes. It publishes the "Classics of Western Spirituality" series. Paulist Press also maintains an online journal, founded by Isaac Hecker, called The Catholic World, which is a collection of articles on faith and culture.

In addition to serving as parish priests, the Paulists continue evangelization by means of the Paulist National Catholic Evangelization Association, National Offices, publishing and film companies as well as Paulist Mission Preachers. The form of each mission largely depends on the preacher; the Paulists emphasize individuality, and each Paulist presents his message in his own way. The Paulists have also relatively recently created National Offices to head up some of their more important ministries.

The Paulist National Office of Ecumenism and Interfaith Relations has the mission of fostering understanding, respect, and collaboration with members of other religions. The office was initially created as a means of updating and educating Paulists in these two fields as to how to go about integrating initiatives locally, but later adopted the additional role of offering consultative visits at campuses, parishes, retreats, and conferences. The office also maintains a newsletter and provides articles and resources for online ministries.

The Paulist Office for Young Adult Ministries is intended to connect young adults to faith communities. The office seeks to promote youth integration and leadership amongst Christian communities, and to see issues and concerns of youth addressed by Church leaders and organizations. This Paulist ministry has many forms such as Busted Halo which is an online spiritual magazine for peoples in their 20s and 30s; the Busted Halo Show, with Father Dave Dwyer, was picked up by the Catholic Channel on Sirius Satellite Radio. The office also hosts young adult retreats and, on occasion, hosts forums and gives presentations. Paulists also have a number of Newman Centers and campus ministries at several major universities throughout the United States; they consider this one of their highest priorities.

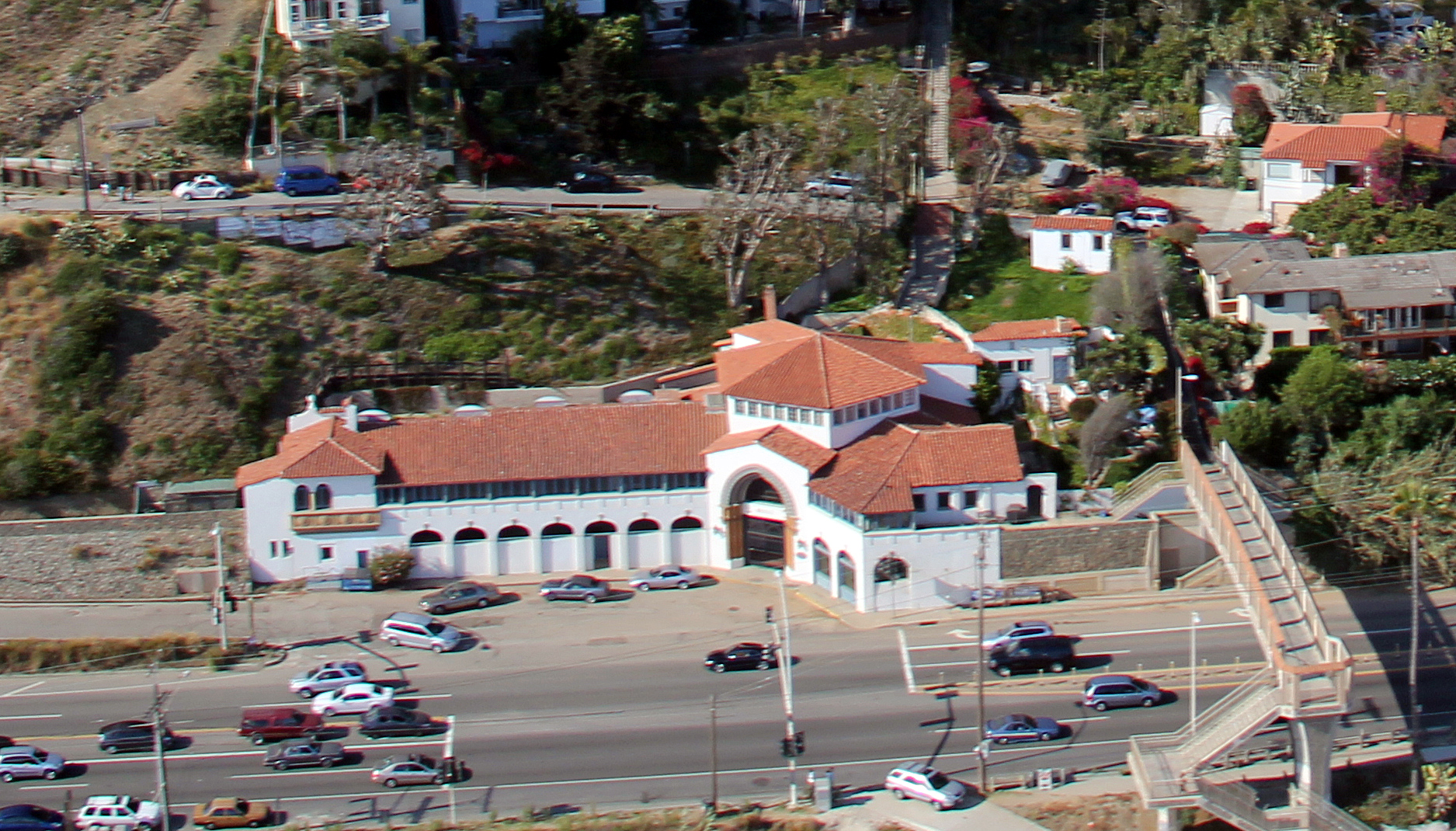
Built in 1928, by Thelma Todd, since the 1960s this has been the home of Paulist Productions

Paulist Productions was founded by Ellwood Kieser in California around 1960. It today creates films and television programs on a variety of subjects with spiritual concerns and matters at the heart of the production. Paulist Productions has received a number of awards and continues to develop and produce an assortment of films and series. It has produced Romero, Entertaining Angels: The Dorothy Day Story, and The Twelve Apostles.

The Paulist Fathers operate Paulist Evangelization Ministries.

In March 2024 the Paulist announced that they would be suspending their ministry at Newman Hall-Holy Spirit Parish, which ministers to the students of University of California, Berkeley, a parish the order had run since 1907. The Paulists also announced they would be withdrawing from ministry at the Rensselaer Polytechnic Institute in Troy, NY along with three other locations, citing a steep decline in vocations. There were 98 active Paulist priests in 2004, which had declined to 85 in 2014 and to 50 in 2024. If the trend continues, there may be only 30 active Paulists by 2034.

== Mission ==
According to their website, the Paulist mission is "to introduce the Good News of Jesus Christ to all people, especially those beyond the Church walls, and to accompany Catholics who feel apart from the Church." Additionally, the Paulist Fathers work to address political polarization in the United States. In recent history, the Paulists have ministries of ecumenism, interfaith relations, and reconciliation. Catholic commentators have described the Paulists as "liberal."

Because the Paulist Fathers' primary mission has been the conversion of the American people and society, almost all of its foundations (as Paulist centers of ministry are called) and priests are located in the US. There are Paulist Foundations in 11 US states and Washington, DC. They also serve the American Catholic community in Rome at San Patrizio (which replaced a former foundation at Santa Susanna in August 2017), and, until June 2015, maintained foundations in Toronto.

== Leadership ==
The President, vice-president, and Council of the Paulist Fathers are elected to four-year terms; in addition, a First Consultor is appointed by the President. Eric Andrews succeeded Michael McGarry as president in May 2014.

== Formation ==
Training to become a Paulist priest is similar to religious institutes. The society is open to single Catholic men with an undergraduate degree that are in good standing with the Church. Training consists of three phases that takes usually 6 years to complete. The first phase is a year-long novitiate, designed to introduce the individual to Paulist life and to help them decide if the Paulist life is for them. The next phase consists of two years of philosophical and theological studies, followed by a one-year apostolate at a Paulist Foundation. On return from his apostolate, he returns to school for two more years and, if successful, will be awarded a Master of Divinity degree. The Paulist Seminary and Novitiate is located at St. Paul's College in Washington, DC, and in recent years Paulist students had a choice of attending either the Catholic University of America or the Washington Theological Union (now closed). Near the end of his studies, the society then decides whether he will proceed to ordination to the diaconate. Once a Deacon, the last phase of formation is a year-long pastoral internship, at the end of which the individual is ordained a priest.

== Patrons ==
Patron saints of the Paulist Fathers include the Virgin Mary, Paul the Apostle, Saint Joseph, Alphonsus Liguori, Francis de Sales, Thomas Aquinas, Saint Patrick, Philip Neri, Teresa of Avila, John of the Cross, Mary Magdalene, and Elizabeth Seton.

== Paulist ministries ==
Location	Foundation	Contact
California, U.S.	Church of St. Paul the Apostle	10750 Ohio Avenue Los Angeles, CA 90024 Phone: 310-474-1527
California, U.S.	UCLA University Catholic Center	633 Gayley Avenue Los Angeles, CA 90024 Phone: 310-208-5015/5016
California, U.S.	Old St. Mary's Cathedral	660 California Street San Francisco, CA 94108-2566 Phone: 415-288-3800
California, U.S.	St. Mary's Chinese School & Center	910 Broadway San Francisco, CA 94133-4204 Phone: 415-929-4690
Florida, U.S.	Paulist Fathers Residence	1225 20th Avenue Vero Beach, FL 32960 Phone: 772-562-0500
Massachusetts, U.S.	Paulist Center	5 Park Street Boston, MA 02108 Phone: 617-742-4460
Michigan, U.S.	Catholic Information Center	360 Division Ave S., Suite 2A Grand Rapids, MI 49503 Phone: 616-459-7267
Michigan, U.S.	Cathedral of St. Andrew	
New York, U.S.	St. Mary's on the Lake	P.O. Box 31 Lake George, NY 12845 Phone: 518-668-5594
New York, U.S.	Church of St. Paul the Apostle	405 West 59th Street New York, NY 10019 Phone: 212-265-3495
New York, U.S.	Paulist Fathers	415 West 59th Street New York, NY 10019 Phone: 212-265-3209
Tennessee, U.S.	Immaculate Conception Church	414 West Vine Avenue Knoxville, TN 37902 Phone: 865-522-1508
Tennessee, U.S.	John XXIII University Parish, University of Tennessee	1710 Melrose Place Knoxville, TN 37916 Phone: 865-523-7931
Texas, U.S.	St. Austin Catholic Parish	2026 Guadalupe Street Austin, TX 78705-5609 Phone: 512-477-9471
Texas, U.S.	St. Paul the Apostle Chapel	201 Dalton Circle Horseshoe Bay, TX 78657 Phone: 830-598-8342
Rome, Italy	St. Patrick's Catholic American Parish in Rome	Rome, Italy Phone: 011-3906-4201-4554

== See also ==
- Catholic World
- Institute of consecrated life
- Orestes Brownson
- Religious institute (Catholic)
- Secular institute
- Vocational Discernment in the Catholic Church
- Order of Saint Paul the First Hermit
