= Transubstantiation =

Catholic sacramental doctrine

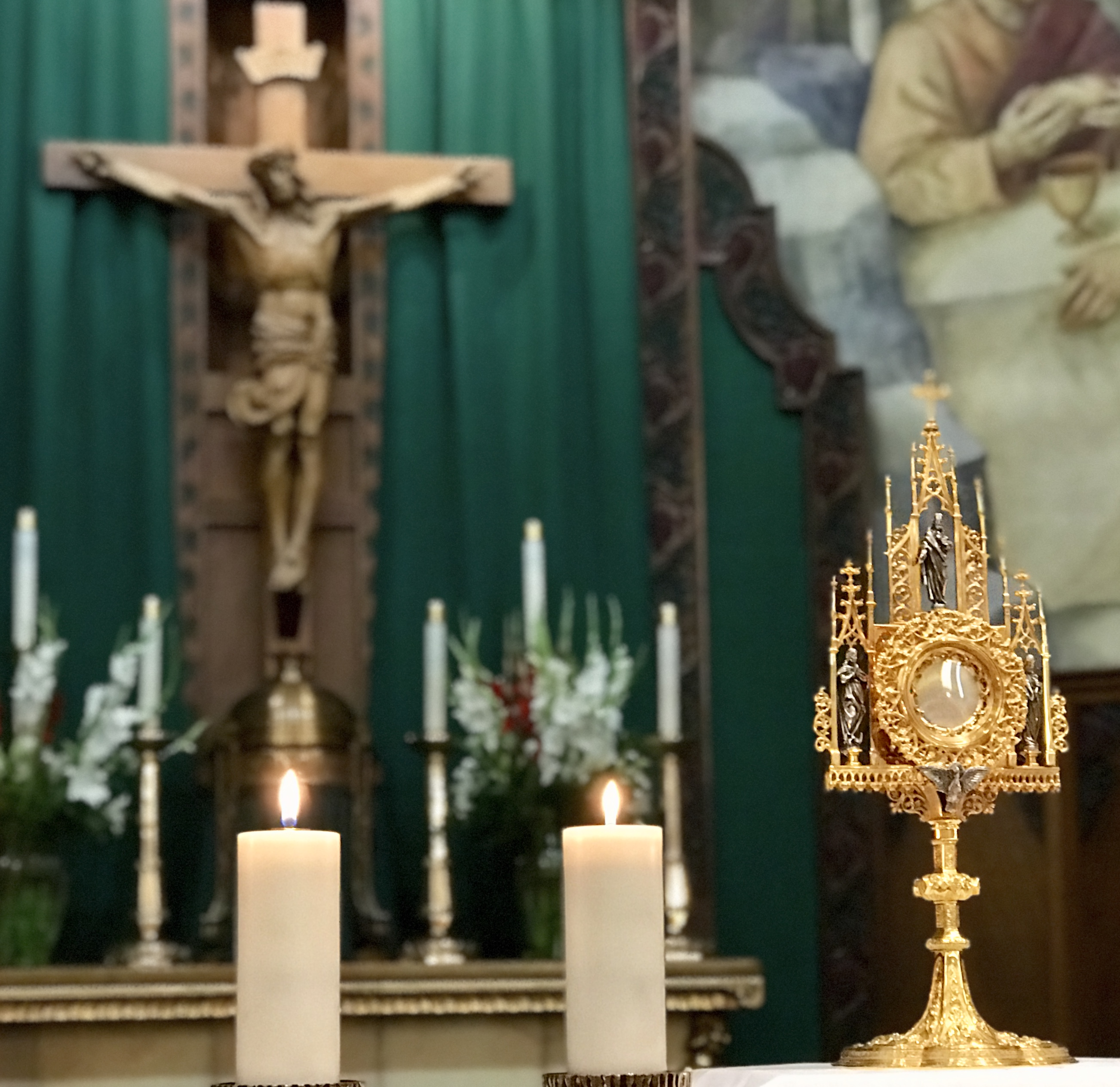
The Eucharist, which the Catholic Church teaches to be the real presence of Christ, exposed for adoration at Saint Thomas Aquinas Cathedral in Reno, Nevada

Transubstantiation (Latin: transsubstantiatio, Greek: μετουσίωσις, romanized: metousiosis) is, according to the teaching of the Catholic Church, "the change of the whole substance of bread into the substance of the Body of Christ and of the whole substance of wine into the substance of the Blood of Christ". This change is brought about in the eucharistic prayer through the efficacy of the word of Christ and by the action of the Holy Spirit. However, "the outward characteristics of bread and wine, that is the 'eucharistic species', remain unaltered". In this teaching, the notions of "substance" and "transubstantiation" are not linked with any particular theory of metaphysics.

The Catholic Church teaches that, in the Eucharistic offering, bread and wine are changed into the body and blood of Christ. The affirmation of this doctrine on the real presence of Christ in the Eucharist was expressed, using the word "transubstantiate", by the Fourth Council of the Lateran in 1215. It was later challenged by various 14th-century reformers, John Wycliffe in particular.

The manner in which the change occurs, the Catholic Church teaches, is a mystery: "The signs of bread and wine become, in a way surpassing understanding, the Body and Blood of Christ." In Lutheranism, the terminology used regarding the real presence is the doctrine of the sacramental union, in which the "very body and blood of Christ" is received. In the Greek Orthodox Church, the doctrine has been discussed under the term of metousiosis, coined as a direct loan-translation of transubstantiatio in the 17th century. In Eastern Orthodoxy in general, the Sacred Mystery (Sacrament) of the Eucharist is more commonly discussed using alternative terms such as "trans-elementation" (μεταστοιχείωσις, metastoicheiosis), "re-ordination" (μεταρρύθμισις, metarrhythmisis), or simply "change" (μεταβολή, metabole).

In the Reformed tradition, a real spiritual presence is taught; this view is held in Anglicanism, especially by those of the Evangelical-Reformed tradition, though others, including those of the High Church tradition, hold to a corporeal presence.

== History ==
=== Apostolic period ===
The New Testament does not use the term transubstantiation or set out an explicit doctrine of transubstantiation. The key passages cited for teaching are Jesus's words at the Last Supper (recorded in Matthew, Mark, and Luke) where he said "This is my body" and "This is my blood," and Paul's received tradition in 1 Corinthians 11:23–26.

The Last Supper reports a meal with bread and wine on the eve of Jesus' crucifixion, in which he identifies the bread as his body and the cup as his blood, and commands repetition "in memory" of him "until he comes." By the mid-1st century Christians made sharing a loaf and cup regular practice, with Paul's tradition treating the bread and cup as participation in Jesus' body and blood.

According to church historian Volker Leppin, an "ontological interpretation" began only later but became decisive for Latin theology, with the doctrine of transubstantiation giving "philosophical expression" to the real presence under the transformed forms of bread and wine.

=== Patristic period ===
The early Church Fathers used strongly realist language about the Eucharist while showing limited interest in defining the precise mode of Christ's presence, often leaving the manner of the change a mystery. Specifically during the period c. 100–325 AD, the doctrine of the Lord's Supper "remained indefinite and obscure", with the ancient church prioritizing "worthy participation" over logical definition and making it unhistorical to impose later theories onto this era.

Gregg R. Allison characterizes early church Eucharistic theology as understanding "the Lord's Supper in a variety of ways", thereby distinguishing later Catholic doctrine from diverse patristic approaches.

During the patristic period a "symbol" was commonly understood as a participating presence rather than a mere sign, so the Fathers could call the Eucharist both Christ's body and its "figure", "type", or "symbol" without contradiction. Later "realist" versus "symbolist" labels impose anachronistic categories on this Platonist sacramental worldview.

==== Catholic readings of patristic quotes ====
The Didache, an early Christian church order, states: "Let no one eat or drink of your Eucharist, unless they have been baptized into the name of the Lord, for ... 'Give not that which is holy to the dogs'." Kelly notes that it calls the Eucharist a "sacrifice" and describes the bread and wine as "holy" spiritual food and drink communicating immortal life. Catholic theologians cite this as early evidence that believers understood the Eucharist as more than a memorial.

Ignatius of Antioch, writing around 106, declares: "I desire the bread of God, ... the bread of life, which is the flesh of Jesus Christ ..., and I desire the drink of God, ... His blood, which is incorruptible love and eternal life." In his letter to the Smyrnaeans he warns that "heretics" "abstain from the Eucharist and from prayer, because they confess not the Eucharist to be the flesh of our Saviour Jesus Christ." Scholars treat this realism as a boundary marker that later Catholic teaching developed conceptually.

Around 150, Justin Martyr wrote: "Not as common bread and common drink do we receive these, but ... the food which is blessed by the prayer of His word, and from which our blood and flesh by transmutation are nourished, is the flesh and blood of that Jesus who was made flesh." Ferguson and Kelly note Justin's contrast between "common" food and the consecrated elements. Catholic authors cite scholastic transubstantiation as a later explanation of this inherited realism.

Clement of Alexandria (c. 150 – c. 215) and Tertullian (c. 200) both use "symbol" and "figure" language for the Eucharist, though scholars dispute whether this excludes real presence. Kelly and Ferguson note that Clement calls wine a "mystical symbol" of Christ's blood yet also speaks of the Eucharistic wine as a mingling of the Logos with material substance that sanctifies body and soul. In ancient symbolic realism, "figure" and "symbol" make present what they signify. Catholic theologians therefore read their symbolic language as participatory realism compatible with later transubstantiation.

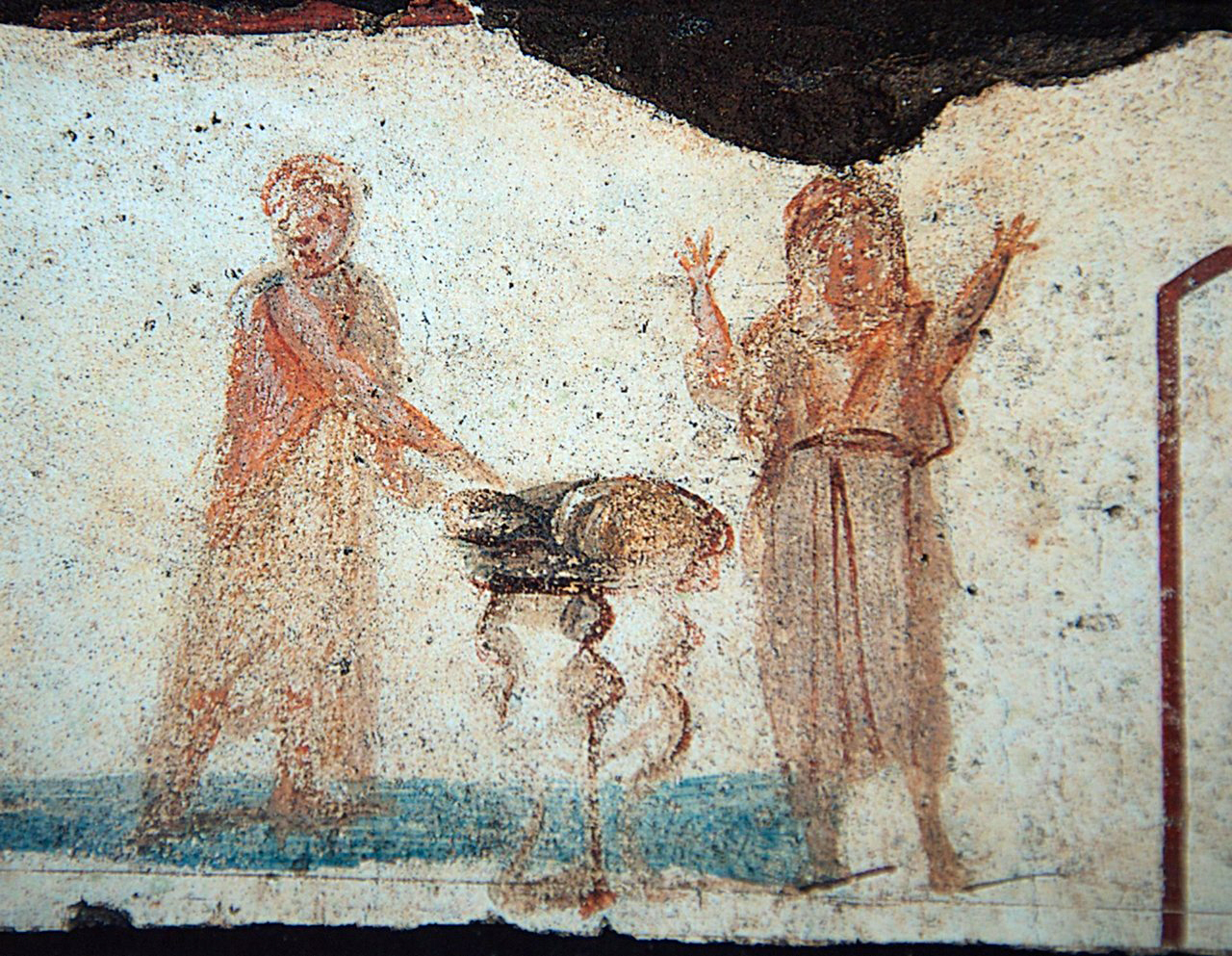
A 3rd-century fresco in the Catacomb of Callixtus, which Joseph Wilpert interprets as depicting Christ's multiplication of the loaves and fishes (a symbol of Eucharistic consecration) and the deceased attaining eternal happiness through participation in the Eucharist.

Irenaeus, in Against Heresies 5.2.3, writes that "the mingled cup and the manufactured bread receives the Word of God." In the same passage, Irenaeus quotes Ephesians 5:30, including the longer textual reading: "we are members of His body, of His flesh, and of His bones." The disputed Greek phrase is "receives the Word/word of God". (Note: Greek: ἐπιδέχεται τὸν λόγον τοῦ Θεοῦ) Priest William A. Jurgens argues that Irenaeus's Eucharistic teaching is "more indicative of an impanation mentality than of later transubstantiation," noting that Irenaeus does not explain how Christ is present in the elements. By contrast, Bradley Green suggests that "in light of later Western developments, it seems appropriate to recognize a hope of transubstantiation in Irenaeus."

The Apostolic Constitutions (compiled c. 380) instructs: "Let the bishop give the oblation, saying, The body of Christ; and let him that receiveth say, Amen." Kelly situates this formula within a fourth-century Eastern tradition that speaks of a "change" (metabolē) or "transelementation" (metastoicheiōsis) into Christ's body and blood. Catholic theologians cite this as evidence of assumed real conversion.

Ambrose of Milan taught a literal change in the elements: "This bread is bread before the words of the sacraments. When consecration has been added, from bread it becomes the body of Christ." Kelly and Papandrea describe Ambrose as a Western exponent of "conversion" language, including his insistence that the consecratory word "changes the species of the elements." Catholic scholars treat this as a patristic precursor to later transubstantiation doctrine.

Cyril of Jerusalem urges communicants to trust Christ's words that the elements have been "changed" despite their appearances, while Gregory of Nyssa and Chrysostom speak of the bread and wine being "transelemented" and "refashioned". Catholic theology cites this shared vocabulary as early conversion language later expressed by the term "transubstantiation".

Augustine declared that the bread consecrated in the Eucharist "becomes" the Body of Christ: "The faithful know what I'm talking about; they know Christ in the breaking of bread. It isn't every loaf of bread, you see, but the one receiving Christ's blessing, that becomes the body of Christ." Despite Augustine's frequent sign and symbol language, Kelly and Ferguson judge that he accepted the period's realism, distinguishing between the visible sacramental sign and the invisible gift. Catholic interpreters therefore treat his position as compatible with later doctrine.

=== Middle Ages ===
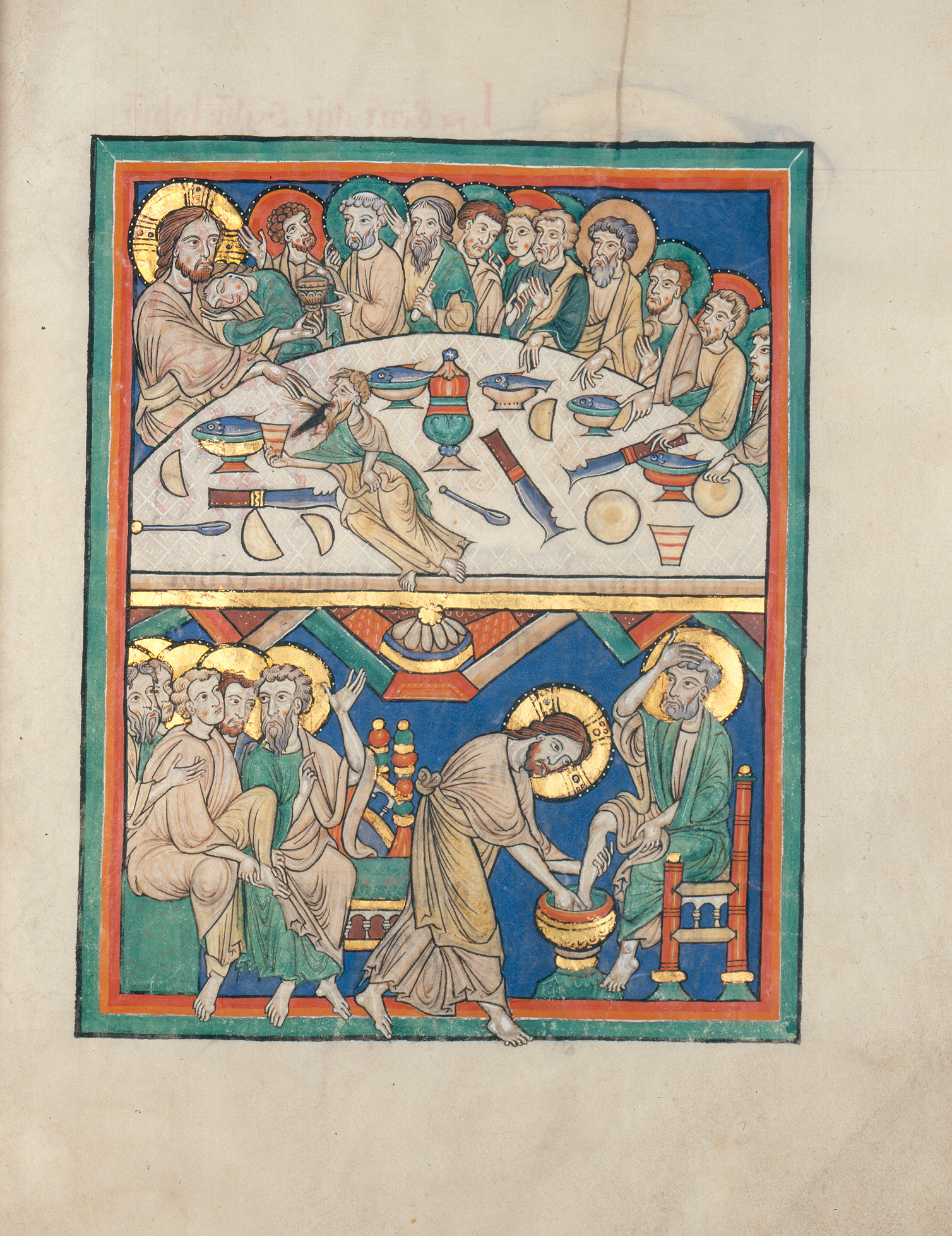
The Last Supper (upper image) and preparatory washing of feet (lower image) in a 1220 manuscript in the Baden State Library, Karlsruhe, Germany

The doctrine of transubstantiation in the technical sense is regarded as a late development in Catholic theology, with the term emerging in medieval Latin theology, receiving conciliar expression at the Fourth Lateran Council (1215), and being given a full scholastic exposition in Thomas Aquinas's Summa theologiae.

Transubstantiation is a Eucharistic doctrine that explains the change of the bread and wine into the body and blood of the risen Christ in terms of a change of "substance" while the "accidents" (outward appearances) remain.

Paschasius Radbertus (785–865) was a Carolingian theologian, and the abbot of Corbie, whose most well-known and influential work is an exposition on the nature of the Eucharist written around 831, entitled De Corpore et Sanguine Domini. In it, Paschasius agrees with Ambrose in affirming that the Eucharist contains the true, historical body of Jesus Christ. According to Paschasius, God is truth itself, and therefore, his words and actions must be true. Christ's proclamation at the Last Supper that the bread and wine were his body and blood must be taken literally, since God is truth. He thus believes that the change of the substances of the bread and wine into the body and blood of Christ offered in the Eucharist really occurs. Only if the Eucharist is the actual body and blood of Christ can a Christian know it is salvific.

In the 11th century, Berengar of Tours stirred up opposition when he denied that any material change in the elements was needed to explain the fact of the Real Presence. His position was never diametrically opposed to that of his critics, and he was probably never excommunicated, but the controversies that he aroused (see Stercoranism) forced people to clarify the doctrine of the Eucharist.

The earliest known use of the term transubstantiation to describe the change from bread and wine to body and blood of Christ in the Eucharist was by Hildebert de Lavardin, Archbishop of Tours, in the late 11th century. By the end of the 12th century the term was in widespread use.

The Fourth Council of the Lateran in 1215 spoke of the bread and wine as "transubstantiated" into the body and blood of Christ: "His body and blood are truly contained in the sacrament of the altar under the forms of bread and wine, the bread and wine having been transubstantiated, by God's power, into his body and blood". Catholic scholars and clergy have noted numerous reports of Eucharistic miracles contemporary with the council, and at least one such report was discussed at the council. It was not until later in the 13th century that Aristotelian metaphysics was accepted and a philosophical elaboration in line with that metaphysics was developed, which found classic formulation in the teaching of Thomas Aquinas and in the theories of later Catholic theologians in the medieval period (Robert Grosseteste, Giles of Rome, Duns Scotus and William of Ockham).

=== Reformation ===
During the Protestant Reformation, the doctrine of transubstantiation was heavily criticised as an Aristotelian "pseudophilosophy" imported into Christian teaching and jettisoned in favor of Martin Luther's doctrine of sacramental union, or in favor, per Huldrych Zwingli, of the Eucharist as memorial.

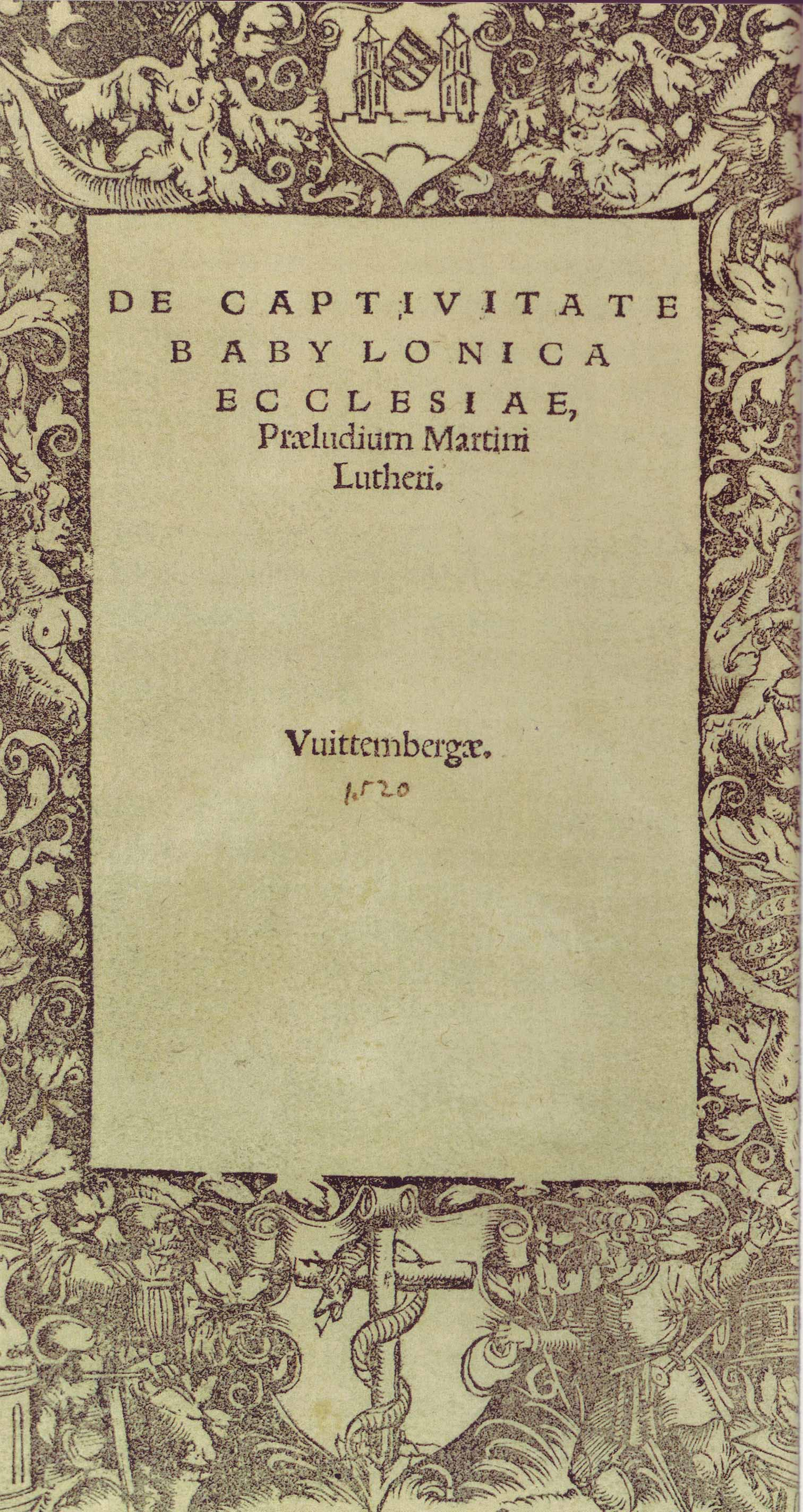
Title page of Martin Luther's De Captivitate Babylonica Ecclesiae

In the Reformation, the doctrine of transubstantiation became a matter of much controversy. Martin Luther held that "It is not the doctrine of transubstantiation which is to be believed, but simply that Christ really is present at the Eucharist". In his On the Babylonian Captivity of the Church (published on 6 October 1520) Luther wrote:

Therefore, it is an absurd and unheard-of juggling with words, to understand "bread" to mean "the form, or accidents of bread", and "wine" to mean "the form, or accidents of wine". Why do they not also understand all other things to mean their forms, or accidents? Even if this might be done with all other things, it would yet not be right thus to emasculate the words of God and arbitrarily to empty them of their meaning. Moreover, the Church had the true faith for more than twelve hundred years, during which time the holy Fathers never once mentioned this transubstantiation – certainly, a monstrous word for a monstrous idea – until the pseudo-philosophy of Aristotle became rampant in the Church these last three hundred years. During these centuries many other things have been wrongly defined, for example, that the Divine essence neither is begotten nor begets, that the soul is the substantial form of the human body, and the like assertions, which are made without reason or sense, as the Cardinal of Cambray himself admits.

In his 1528 Confession Concerning Christ's Supper, he wrote:

Why then should we not much more say in the Supper, "This is my body", even though bread and body are two distinct substances, and the word "this" indicates the bread? Here, too, out of two kinds of objects a union has taken place, which I shall call a "sacramental union", because Christ's body and the bread are given to us as a sacrament. This is not a natural or personal union, as is the case with God and Christ. It is also perhaps a different union from that which the dove has with the Holy Spirit, and the flame with the angel, but it is also assuredly a sacramental union.

What Luther thus called a "sacramental union" is often erroneously called "consubstantiation" by non-Lutherans. In On the Babylonian Captivity, Luther upheld belief in the Real Presence of Jesus and, in his 1523 treatise The Adoration of the Sacrament, defended adoration of the body and blood of Christ in the Eucharist.

In England, the Six Articles of 1539 prescribed the death penalty for any who denied transubstantiation. This was changed under Elizabeth I. In the Thirty-nine Articles of 1563, the Church of England declared: "Transubstantiation (or the change of the substance of Bread and Wine) in the Supper of the Lord, cannot be proved by holy Writ, but is repugnant to the plain words of Scripture, overthroweth the nature of a Sacrament, and hath given occasion to many superstitions". Laws were enacted against participation in Catholic worship, which remained illegal until 1791.

For a century and half – 1672 to 1828 – transubstantiation had an important role, in a negative way, in British political and social life. Under the Test Act, the holding of any public office was made conditional upon explicitly denying Transubstantiation. Any aspirant to public office had to repeat the formula set out by the law: "I, N, do declare that I do believe that there is not any transubstantiation in the sacrament of the Lord's Supper, or in the elements of the bread and wine, at or after the consecration thereof by any person whatsoever."

==== Council of Trent ====
In 1551, the Council of Trent declared that the doctrine of transubstantiation is a dogma of faith and stated that "by the consecration of the bread and wine there takes place a change of the whole substance of the bread into the substance of the body of Christ our Lord and of the whole substance of the wine into the substance of his blood. This change the holy Catholic Church has fittingly and properly called transubstantiation." In its 13th session ending 11 October 1551, the Council defined transubstantiation as "that wonderful and singular conversion of the whole substance of the bread into the Body, and of the whole substance of the wine into the Blood – the species only of the bread and wine remaining – which conversion indeed the Catholic Church most aptly calls Transubstantiation". This council officially approved use of the term "transubstantiation" to express the Catholic Church's teaching on the subject of the conversion of the bread and wine into the body and blood of Christ in the Eucharist, with the aim of safeguarding Christ's presence as a literal truth, while emphasizing the fact that there is no change in the empirical appearances of the bread and wine. It did not however impose the Aristotelian theory of substance and accidents: it spoke only of the species (the appearances), not the philosophical term "accidents", and the word "substance" was in ecclesiastical use for many centuries before Aristotelian philosophy was adopted in the West, as shown for instance by its use in the Nicene Creed which speaks of Christ having the same "οὐσία" (Greek) or "substantia" (Latin) as the Father.

=== Since the Second Vatican Council ===
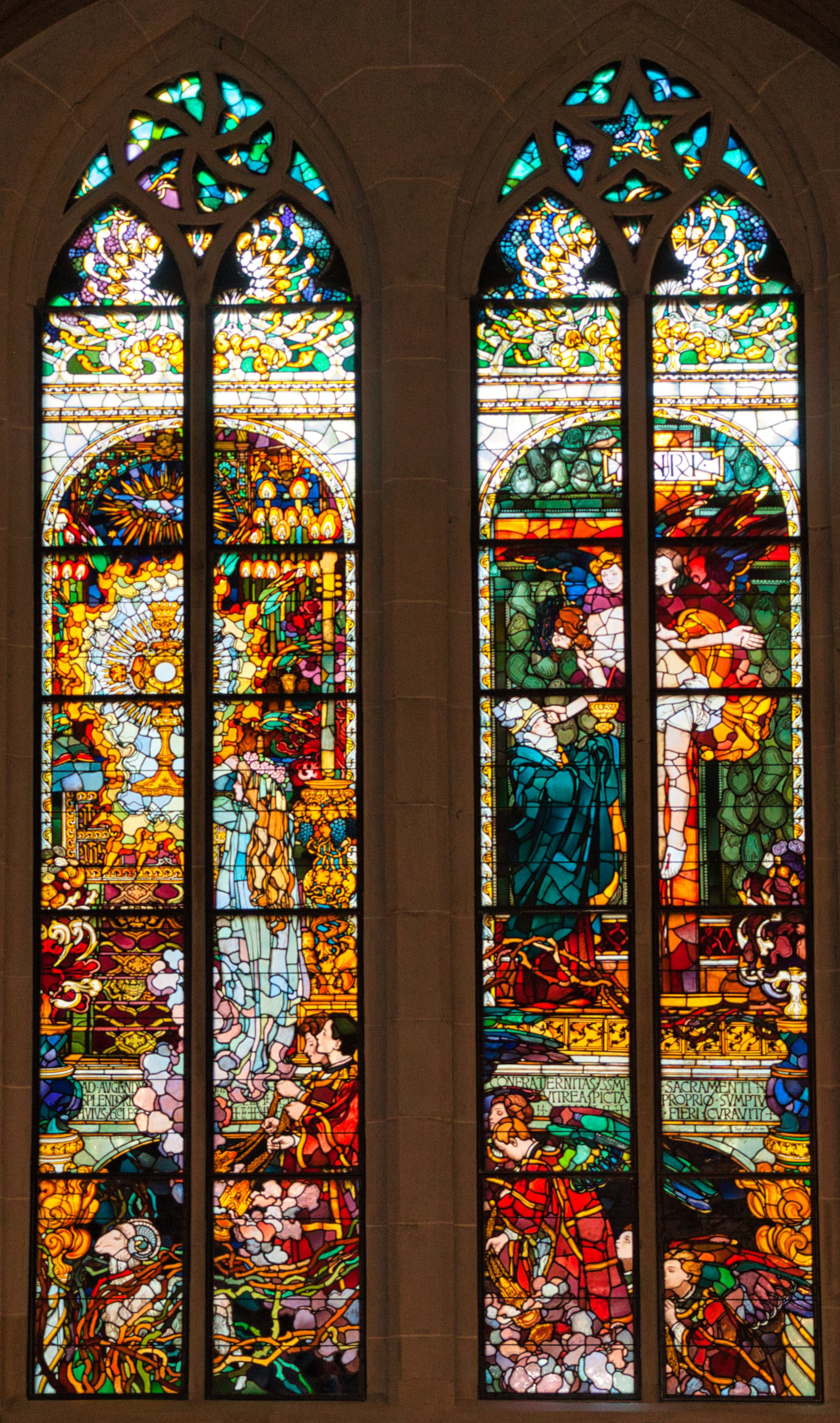

Monstrance with transparent host (detail from the Eucharist window by J. Mehoffer in the Cathedral of St Nicholas in Fribourg, Switzerland)

The Catechism of the Catholic Church states the Church's teaching on transubstantiation twice.

It repeats what it calls the Council of Trent's summary of the Catholic faith on "the conversion of the bread and wine into Christ's body and blood [by which] Christ becomes present in this sacrament", faith "in the efficacy of the Word of Christ and of the action of the Holy Spirit to bring about this conversion": "[B]y the consecration of the bread and wine there takes place a change of the whole substance of the bread into the substance of the body of Christ our Lord and of the whole substance of the wine into the substance of his blood. This change the holy Catholic Church has fittingly and properly called transubstantiation".

As part of its own summary ("In brief") of the Catechism of the Catholic Church on the sacrament of the Eucharist, it states: "By the consecration the transubstantiation of the bread and wine into the Body and Blood of Christ is brought about. Under the consecrated species of bread and wine Christ himself, living and glorious, is present in a true, real, and substantial manner: his Body and his Blood, with his soul and his divinity (cf. Council of Trent: DS 1640, 1651)."

The Church's teaching is given in the Compendium of the Catechism of the Catholic Church in question and answer form:

283. What is the meaning of transubstantiation? Transubstantiation means the change of the whole substance of bread into the substance of the Body of Christ and of the whole substance of wine into the substance of his Blood. This change is brought about in the eucharistic prayer through the efficacy of the word of Christ and by the action of the Holy Spirit. However, the outward characteristics of bread and wine, that is the "eucharistic species", remain unaltered.

The Anglican–Roman Catholic Joint Preparatory Commission stated in 1971 in their common declaration on Eucharistic doctrine: "The word transubstantiation is commonly used in the Roman Catholic Church to indicate that God acting in the eucharist effects a change in the inner reality of the elements."

==== Opinions of some individuals (not necessarily typical) ====
In 2017 Irish Augustinian Gabriel Daly said that the Council of Trent approved use of the term "transubstantiation" as suitable and proper, but did not make it obligatory, and he suggested that its continued use is partly to blame for lack of progress towards sharing of the Eucharist between Protestants and Catholics.

Traditionalist Catholic Paolo Pasqualucci said that the absence of the term in the Second Vatican Council's constitution on the liturgy Sacrosanctum Concilium means that it presents the Catholic Mass "in the manner of the Protestants". To this Dave Armstrong replied that "The word may not be present; but the concept is." For instance, the document Gaudium et spes refers to the "sacrament of faith where natural elements refined by man are gloriously changed into His Body and Blood, providing a meal of brotherly solidarity and a foretaste of the heavenly banquet" (Chapter 3).

Thomas J. Reese commented that "using Aristotelian concepts to explain Catholic mysteries in the 21st century is a fool's errand", while Timothy O'Malley remarked that "it is possible to teach the doctrine of transubstantiation without using the words 'substance' and 'accidents'. If the word 'substance' scares people off, you can say, 'what it really is', and that is what substance is. What it really is, what it absolutely is at its heart is Christ's body and blood".

==== General belief and doctrine knowledge among Catholics ====
A Georgetown University CARA poll of United States Catholics in 2008 showed that 57% said they believed that Jesus Christ is really present in the Eucharist in 2008 and nearly 43% said that they believed the wine and bread are symbols of Jesus. Of those attending Mass weekly or more often, 91% believed in the Real Presence, as did 65% of those who merely attended at least once a month, and 40% of those who attended at most a few times a year.

Among Catholics attending Mass at least once a month, the percentage of belief in the Real Presence was 86% for pre–Vatican II Catholics, 74% for Vatican II Catholics, 75% for post-Vatican II Catholics, and 85% for Millennials.

A 2019 Pew Research Report found that 69% of United States Catholics believed that in the Eucharist the bread and wine "are symbols of the body and blood of Jesus Christ", and only 31% believed that, "during Catholic Mass, the bread and wine actually become the body and blood of Jesus". Of the latter group, most (28% of all US Catholics) said they knew that this is what the Church teaches, while the remaining 3% said they did not know it. Of the 69% who said the bread and wine are symbols, almost two-thirds (43% of all Catholics) said that what they believed is the Church's teaching, 22% said that they believed it in spite of knowing that the Church teaches that the bread and wine actually become the body and blood of Christ. Among United States Catholics who attend Mass at least once a week, the most observant group, 63% accepted that the bread and wine actually become the body and blood of Christ; the other 37% saw the bread and wine as symbols, most of them (23%) not knowing that the Church, so the survey stated, teaches that the elements actually become the body and blood of Christ, while the remaining 14% rejected what was given as the Church's teaching. The Pew Report presented "the understanding that the bread and wine used in Communion are symbols of the body and blood of Jesus Christ" as contradicting belief that, "during Catholic Mass, the bread and wine actually become the body and blood of Jesus". The Catholic Church itself speaks of the bread and wine used in Communion both as "signs" and as "becoming" Christ's body and blood: "[...] the signs of bread and wine become, in a way surpassing understanding, the Body and Blood of Christ".

In a comment on the Pew Research Report, Greg Erlandson drew attention to the difference between the formulation in the CARA survey, in which the choice was between "Jesus Christ is really present in the bread and wine of the Eucharist" and "the bread and wine are symbols of Jesus, but Jesus is not really present", and the Pew Research choice between "during Catholic Mass, the bread and wine actually become the body and blood of Jesus" and "the bread wine are symbols of the body and blood of Jesus Christ". He quotes an observation by Mark Gray that the word "actually" makes it sound like "something that could be analyzed under a microscope or empirically observed", while what the Church teaches is that the "substance" of the bread and wine are changed at consecration, but the "accidents" or appearances of bread and wine remain. Erlandson commented further: "Catholics may not be able to articulately define the 'Real Presence', and the phrase [sic] 'transubstantiation' may be obscure to them, but in their reverence and demeanor, they demonstrate their belief that this is not just a symbol".

== Theology ==
=== Catholic Church ===
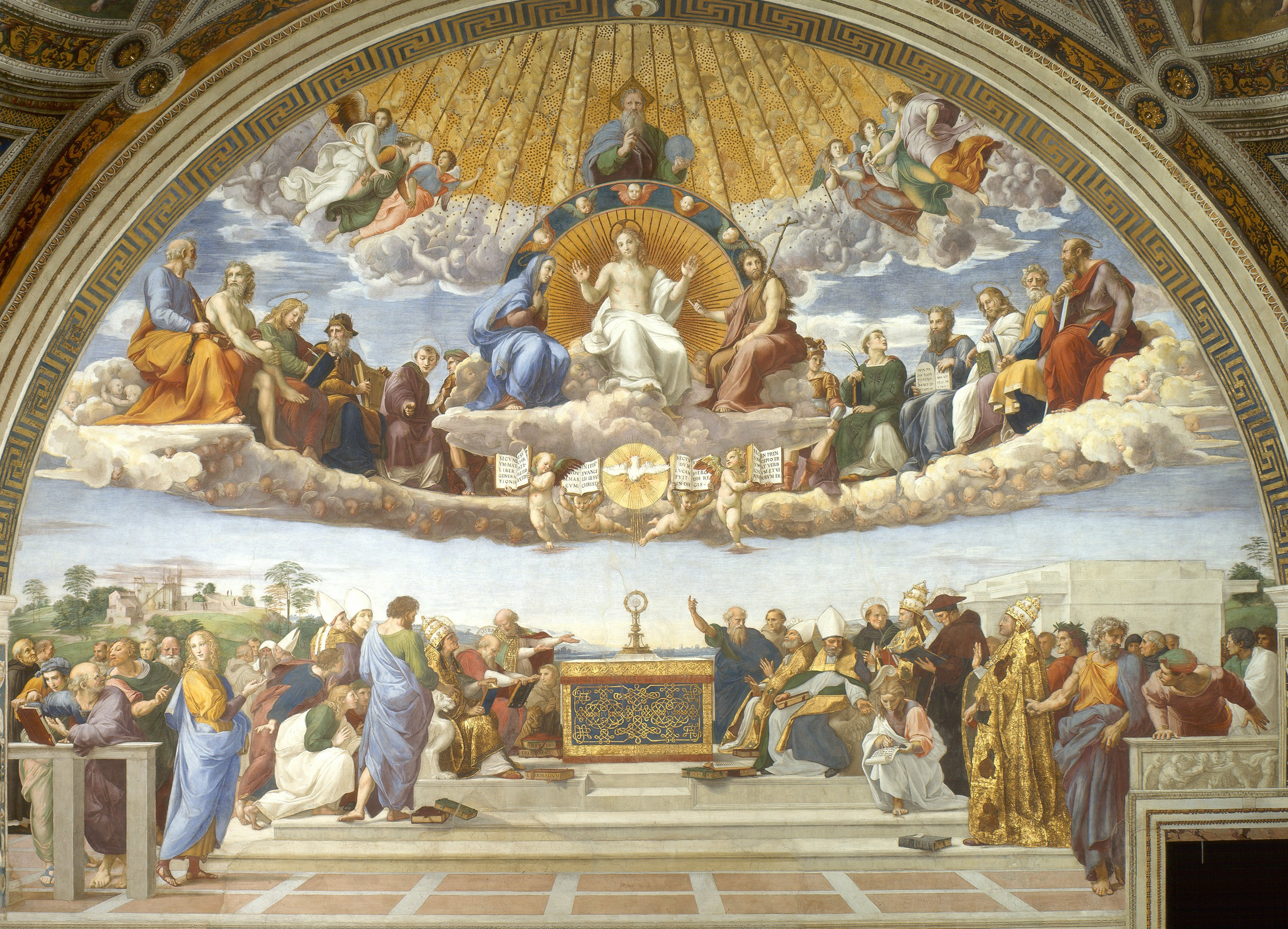
The Disputation of the Holy Sacrament in the Vatican (by Raphael 1509–1510) depicts theologians debating Transubstantiation, including four Doctors of the Church, with Pope Gregory I and Jerome seated to the left of the altar and Augustine and Ambrose to the right, Pope Julius II, Pope Sixtus IV, Girolamo Savonarola and the poet Dante Alighieri.

While the Catholic doctrine of transubstantiation in relation to the Eucharist can be viewed in terms of the Aristotelian distinction between substance and accident, Catholic theologians generally hold that, "in referring to the Eucharist, the Church does not use the terms substance and accident in their philosophical contexts but in the common and ordinary sense in which they were first used many centuries ago. The dogma of transubstantiation does not embrace any philosophical theory in particular." This ambiguity was recognized also by then-Lutheran theologian Jaroslav Pelikan, (Note: Pelikan later converted to Eastern Orthodoxy.) who, while himself interpreting the terms as Aristotelian, states that "the application of the term 'substance' to the discussion of the Eucharistic presence antedates the rediscovery of Aristotle. [...] Even 'transubstantiation' was used during the twelfth century in a nontechnical sense. Such evidence lends credence to the argument that the doctrine of transubstantiation, as codified by the decrees of the Fourth Lateran and Tridentine councils, did not canonize Aristotelian philosophy as indispensable to Christian doctrine. But whether it did so or not in principle, it has certainly done so in effect".

The view that the distinction is independent of any philosophical theory has been expressed as follows: "The distinction between substance and accidents is real, not just imaginary. In the case of the person, the distinction between the person and his or her accidental features is after all real. Therefore, even though the notion of substance and accidents originated from Aristotelian philosophy, the distinction between substance and accidents is also independent of philosophical and scientific development." "Substance" here means what something is in itself: take some concrete object – e.g. your own hat. The shape is not the object itself, nor is its color, size, softness to the touch, nor anything else about it perceptible to the senses. The object itself (the "substance") has the shape, the color, the size, the softness and the other appearances, but is distinct from them. While the appearances are perceptible to the senses, the substance is not.

The philosophical term "accidents" does not appear in the teaching of the Council of Trent on transubstantiation, which is repeated in the Catechism of the Catholic Church. For what the Council distinguishes from the "substance" of the bread and wine it uses the term species:

The Council of Trent summarizes the Catholic faith by declaring: "Because Christ our Redeemer said that it was truly his body that he was offering under the species of bread, it has always been the conviction of the Church of God, and this holy Council now declares again, that by the consecration of the bread and wine there takes place a change of the whole substance of the bread into the substance of the body of Christ our Lord and of the whole substance of the wine into the substance of his blood. This change the holy Catholic Church has fittingly and properly called transubstantiation."

The Catechism of the Catholic Church cites the Council of Trent also in regard to the mode of the real presence of Christ in the Eucharist:

In the most blessed sacrament of the Eucharist "the body and blood, together with the soul and divinity, of our Lord Jesus Christ and, therefore, the whole Christ is truly, really, and substantially contained." (Council of Trent (1551): DS 1651) "This presence is called 'real' – by which is not intended to exclude the other types of presence as if they could not be 'real' too, but because it is presence in the fullest sense: that is to say, it is a substantial presence by which Christ, God and man, makes himself wholly and entirely present." (Paul VI, MF 39).

The Catholic Church holds that the same change of the substance of the bread and of the wine at the Last Supper continues to occur at the consecration of the Eucharist when the words are spoken in persona Christi "This is my body ... this is my blood." In Orthodox confessions, the change is said to start during the Dominical or Lord's Words or Institution Narrative and be completed during the Epiklesis.

Teaching that Christ is risen from the dead and is alive, the Catholic Church holds, in addition to the doctrine of transubstantiation, that when the bread is changed into his body, not only his body is present, but Christ as a whole is present ("the body and blood, together with the soul and divinity"). The same holds when the wine is transubstantiated into the blood of Christ. This is known as the doctrine of concomitance.

In accordance with the dogmatic teaching that Christ is really, truly and substantially present under the appearances of bread and wine, and continues to be present as long as those appearances remain, the Catholic Church preserves the consecrated elements, generally in a church tabernacle, for administering Holy Communion to the sick and dying.

In the arguments which characterised the relationship between Catholicism and Protestantism in the 16th century, the Council of Trent declared subject to the ecclesiastical penalty of anathema anyone who

denieth, that, in the sacrament of the most holy Eucharist, are contained truly, really, and substantially, the body and blood together with the soul and divinity of our Lord Jesus Christ, and consequently the whole Christ; but saith that He is only therein as in a sign, or in figure, or virtue [... and anyone who] saith, that, in the sacred and holy sacrament of the Eucharist, the substance of the bread and wine remains conjointly with the body and blood of our Lord Jesus Christ, and denieth that wonderful and singular conversion of the whole substance of the bread into the Body, and of the whole substance of the wine into the Blood – the species only of the bread and wine remaining – which conversion indeed the Catholic Church most aptly calls Transubstantiation, let him be anathema.

— Council of Trent, quoted in J. Waterworth (ed.), The Council of Trent: The Thirteenth Session

The Catholic Church asserts that the consecrated bread and wine are not merely "symbols" of the body and blood of Christ: they are the body and blood of Christ. It also declares that, although the bread and wine completely cease to be bread and wine (having become the body and blood of Christ), the appearances (the "species" or look) remain unchanged, and the properties of the appearances also remain (one can be drunk with the appearance of wine despite it only being an appearance). They are still the appearances of bread and wine, not of Christ, and do not inhere in the substance of Christ. They can be felt and tasted as before, and are subject to change and can be destroyed. If the appearance of bread is lost by turning to dust or the appearance of wine is lost by turning to vinegar, Christ is no longer present.

The essential signs of the Eucharistic sacrament are wheat bread and grape wine, on which the blessing of the Holy Spirit is invoked and the priest pronounces the words of consecration spoken by Jesus during the Last Supper: "This is my body which will be given up for you. ... This is the cup of my blood ..." When the signs cease to exist, so does the sacrament.

According to Catholic teaching, the whole of Christ, body and blood, soul and divinity, is really, truly and substantially in the sacrament, under each of the appearances of bread and wine, but he is not in the sacrament as in a place and is not moved when the sacrament is moved. He is perceptible neither by the sense nor by the imagination, but only by the intellectual eye.

St Thomas Aquinas gave poetic expression to this perception in the devotional hymn Adoro te devote:

Godhead here in hiding, whom I do adore,
Masked by these bare shadows, shape and nothing more,
See, Lord, at thy service low lies here a heart
Lost, all lost in wonder at the God thou art.

Seeing, touching, tasting are in thee deceived:
How says trusty hearing? that shall be believed.
What God's Son has told me, take for truth I do;
Truth himself speaks truly or there's nothing true.

— English translation of Adoro Te Devote

An official statement from the Anglican–Roman Catholic International Commission titled Eucharistic Doctrine, published in 1971, states that "the word transubstantiation is commonly used in the Catholic Church to indicate that God acting in the Eucharist effects a change in the inner reality of the elements. The term should be seen as affirming the fact of Christ's presence and of the mysterious and radical change which takes place. In Catholic theology it is not understood as explaining how the change takes place." In the smallest particle of the host or the smallest droplet from the chalice Jesus Christ himself is present: "Christ is present whole and entire in each of the species and whole and entire in each of their parts, in such a way that the breaking of the bread does not divide Christ."

=== Eastern Christianity ===
As the disputation of the Holy Sacrament took place in the Western Church after the Great Schism, the Eastern Churches remained largely unaffected by it. The debate on the nature of "transubstantiation" in Greek Orthodoxy begins in the 17th century, with Cyril Lucaris, whose The Eastern Confession of the Orthodox Faith was published in Latin in 1629. The Greek term metousiosis (μετουσίωσις) is first used as the translation of Latin transubstantiatio in the Greek edition of the work, published in 1633.

The Eastern Catholic, Oriental Orthodox and Eastern Orthodox Churches, along with the Assyrian Church of the East, agree that in a valid Divine Liturgy bread and wine truly and actually become the body and blood of Christ. In Orthodox confessions, the change is said to start during the Liturgy of Preparation and be completed during the Epiklesis. However, there are official church documents that speak of a "change" (in Greek μεταβολή) or "metousiosis" (μετουσίωσις) of the bread and wine. "Μετ-ουσί-ωσις" (met-ousi-osis) is the Greek word used to represent the Latin word "trans-substanti-atio", as Greek "μετα-μόρφ-ωσις" (meta-morph-osis) corresponds to Latin "trans-figur-atio". Examples of official documents of the Eastern Orthodox Church that use the term "μετουσίωσις" or "transubstantiation" are the Longer Catechism of The Orthodox, Catholic, Eastern Church (question 340) and the declaration by the Eastern Orthodox Synod of Jerusalem of 1672:

In the celebration of [the Eucharist] we believe the Lord Jesus Christ to be present. He is not present typically, nor figuratively, nor by superabundant grace, as in the other Mysteries, nor by a bare presence, as some of the Fathers have said concerning Baptism, or by impanation, so that the Divinity of the Word is united to the set forth bread of the Eucharist hypostatically, as the followers of Luther most ignorantly and wretchedly suppose. But [he is present] truly and really, so that after the consecration of the bread and of the wine, the bread is transmuted, transubstantiated, converted and transformed into the true Body Itself of the Lord, Which was born in Bethlehem of the ever-Virgin, was baptized in the Jordan, suffered, was buried, rose again, was received up, sits at the right hand of the God and Father, and is to come again in the clouds of Heaven; and the wine is converted and transubstantiated into the true Blood Itself of the Lord, Which as He hung upon the Cross, was poured out for the life of the world.

The way in which the bread and wine become the body and blood of Christ has never been dogmatically defined by the Eastern Orthodox Churches. However, St Theodore the Studite writes in his treatise "On the Holy Icons": "for we confess that the faithful receive the very body and blood of Christ, according to the voice of God himself." This was a refutation of the iconoclasts, who insisted that the eucharist was the only true icon of Christ. Thus, it can be argued that by being part of the dogmatic "horos" against the iconoclast heresy, the teaching on the "real presence" of Christ in the eucharist is indeed a dogma of the Eastern Orthodox Church.

=== Protestantism ===
==== Lutheranism ====
Lutherans explicitly reject transubstantiation believing that the bread and wine remain fully bread and fully wine while also being truly the body and blood of Jesus Christ. Lutheran churches instead emphasize the sacramental union (not exactly the consubstantiation, as is often claimed) and believe that within the Eucharistic celebration the body and blood of Jesus Christ are objectively present "in, with, and under the forms" of bread and wine (cf. Book of Concord). They place great stress on Jesus's instructions to "take and eat", and "take and drink", holding that this is the proper, divinely ordained use of the sacrament, and, while giving it due reverence, scrupulously avoid any actions that might indicate or lead to superstition or unworthy fear of the sacrament.

In dialogue with Catholic theologians, a large measure of agreement has been reached by a group of Lutheran theologians. They recognize that "in contemporary Catholic expositions, ... transubstantiation intends to affirm the fact of Christ's presence and of the change which takes place, and is not an attempt to explain how Christ becomes present. ... [And] that it is a legitimate way of attempting to express the mystery, even though they continue to believe that the conceptuality associated with 'transubstantiation' is misleading and therefore prefer to avoid the term."

==== Reformed churches ====
The Reformed tradition (Continental Reformed, Presbyterian, Congregationalist, and Classical Anglican) holds John Calvin's view of "pneumatic presence" or "spiritual feeding", a Real Presence by the Holy Spirit for those who have faith. Calvin "can be regarded as occupying a position roughly midway between" the doctrines of Martin Luther on one hand and Huldrych Zwingli on the other. He taught that "the thing that is signified is effected by its sign", declaring: "Believers ought always to live by this rule: whenever they see symbols appointed by the Lord, to think and be convinced that the truth of the thing signified is surely present there. For why should the Lord put in your hand the symbol of his body, unless it was to assure you that you really participate in it? And if it is true that a visible sign is given to us to seal the gift of an invisible thing, when we have received the symbol of the body, let us rest assured that the body itself is also given to us."

The Westminster Shorter Catechism summarises the teaching:

Q. What is the Lord's supper? A. The Lord's supper is a sacrament, wherein, by giving and receiving bread and wine according to Christ's appointment, his death is showed forth; and the worthy receivers are, not after a corporal and carnal manner, but by faith, made partakers of his body and blood, with all his benefits, to their spiritual nourishment and growth in grace.

==== Anglicanism ====
Transubstantiation is generally rejected in Anglicanism.

Elizabeth I gave royal assent to the 39 Articles. The Articles declared that "Transubstantiation (or the change of the substance of Bread and Wine) in the Supper of the Lord, cannot be proved by holy Writ; but is repugnant to the plain words of Scripture, overthroweth the nature of a Sacrament, and hath given occasion to many superstitions." The Elizabethan Settlement accepted the Real Presence of Christ in the Sacrament, but refused to define it, preferring to leave it a mystery. Indeed, for many years it was illegal in Britain to hold public office whilst believing in transubstantiation, as under the Test Act of 1673. Archbishop John Tillotson decried the "real barbarousness of this Sacrament and Rite of our Religion", considering it a great impiety to believe that people who attend Holy Communion "verily eat and drink the natural flesh and blood of Christ. And what can any man do more unworthily towards a Friend? How can he possibly use him more barbarously, than to feast upon his living flesh and blood?" (Discourse against Transubstantiation, London 1684, 35). In the Church of England today, clergy are required to assent that the 39 Articles have borne witness to the Christian faith.

Thomas Cranmer, the guiding figure of the Protestant Reformation in England, aligned himself with the Eucharistic theology of John Calvin, which is reflected in the 28th Article of the Thirty-Nine Articles of the Church of England: "the Body of Christ is given, taken, and eaten, in the Supper, only after an heavently and spiritual manner." This view is the real spiritual presence (pneumatic presence) and is held by denominations of the Reformed (Continental Reformed, Presbyterian, Congregationalist, and Reformed Anglican) tradition.

The Eucharistic teaching labeled "receptionism", defined by Claude Beaufort Moss as "the theory that we receive the Body and Blood of Christ when we receive the bread and wine, but they are not identified with the bread and wine which are not changed", was commonly held by 16th and 17th-century Anglican theologians. It was characteristic of 17th century thought to "insist on the real presence of Christ in the Eucharist, but to profess agnosticism concerning the manner of the presence". It remained "the dominant theological position in the Church of England until the Oxford Movement in the early nineteenth century, with varying degrees of emphasis". Importantly, it is "a doctrine of the real presence" but one which "relates the presence primarily to the worthy receiver rather than to the elements of bread and wine".

Anglicans generally consider no teaching binding that, according to the Articles, "cannot be found in Holy Scripture or proved thereby", and are not unanimous in the interpretation of such passages as John 6 and 1 Corinthians 11, although all Anglicans affirm a view of the real presence of Christ in the Eucharist: some Anglicans (especially Anglo-Catholics and some other High Church Anglicans) hold to a belief in the corporeal presence while Evangelical Anglicans hold to a belief in the pneumatic presence. As with all Anglicans, Anglo-Catholics and other High Church Anglicans historically held belief in the real presence of Christ in the Eucharist but were "hostile to the doctrine of transubstantiation". A major leader in the Anglo-Catholic Oxford Movement, Edward Pusey, championed the view of consubstantiation:

I cannot deem it unfair to apply the name of Consubstantiation to a doctrine which teaches, that "the true flesh and true blood of Christ are in the true bread and wine", in such a way that "whatsoever motion or action the bread" and wine have, the body and blood "of Christ also" have "the same"; and that "the substances in both cases" are "so mingled—that they should constitute some one thing".

However, in the first half of the twentieth century, the Catholic Propaganda Society upheld both Article XXVIII and the doctrine of transubstantiation, stating that the 39 Articles specifically condemn a pre-Council of Trent "interpretation which was included by some under the term Transubstantiation" in which "the bread and wine were only left as a delusion of the senses after consecration"; it stated that "this Council propounded its definition after the Articles were written, and so cannot be referred to by them".

Theological dialogue with the Catholic Church has produced common documents that speak of "substantial agreement" about the doctrine of the Eucharist: the ARCIC Windsor Statement of 1971, and its 1979 Elucidation. Remaining arguments can be found in the Church of England's pastoral letter: The Eucharist: Sacrament of Unity.

==== Methodism ====
Methodists believe in the real spiritual presence of Christ in the bread and wine (or grape juice) while, like Presbyterians, rejecting transubstantiation. Methodism inherited the Reformed view of the Lord's Supper through the Twenty-five Articles, in which Article XVIII posits a real spiritual presence of Christ in the Eucharist, noting that the "body of Christ is given, taken, and eaten in the Supper, only after an heavenly and spiritual manner." According to the United Methodist Church, "Jesus Christ, who 'is the reflection of God's glory and the exact imprint of God's very being', is truly present in Holy Communion."

While upholding the view that scripture is the primary source of Church practice, Methodists also look to church tradition and base their beliefs on the early Church teachings on the Eucharist, that Christ has a real presence in the Lord's Supper. The Catechism for the use of the people called Methodists thus states that, "[in Holy Communion] Jesus Christ is present with his worshipping people and gives himself to them as their Lord and Saviour".

==== Anabaptism ====
Anabaptists reject transubstantiation, and do not put a strong emphasis on a real spiritual presence. Many Anabaptist churches consider communion to be purely symbolic, and within Anabaptist theology this is not considered contentious or controversial.

== See also ==
- Concomitance (doctrine)
- Eucharistic miracle
- Host desecration
- Memorialism
- Mysterium fidei (encyclical)
- New Covenant
- Nominalism
- Transignification
- Utraquism
