= Metousiosis =

Greek term that means a change of ousia

Metousiosis is a Greek term (μετουσίωσις) that means a change of ousia (οὐσία 'essence, inner reality').

== History ==
The declaration of the 1672 Synod of Jerusalem is quoted by J.M. Neale (History of Eastern Church, Parker, Oxford and London, 1858) as follows: "When we use the word metousiosis, we by no means think it explains the mode by which the bread and wine are converted into the Body and Blood of Christ, for this is altogether incomprehensible [...] but we mean that the bread and wine are changed into the Body and Blood of the Lord, not figuratively or symbolically, nor by any extraordinary grace attached to them ... but ... the bread becomes verily and indeed and essentially the very true Body of the Lord, and the wine the very Blood of the Lord."

== Theology and dogmatic status ==
The Eastern Orthodox Church's 1672 Synod of Jerusalem released what the Encyclopædia Britannica called "the most vital statement of faith made in the Greek Church during the past thousand years". Philip Schaff wrote in his Creeds of Christendom: "This Synod is the most important in the modern history of the Eastern Church, and may be compared to the Council of Trent. Both fixed the doctrinal status of the Churches they represent, and both condemned the evangelical doctrines of Protestantism ... the Romish [sic] doctrine of transubstantiation (μεταβολή [metabolí], μετουσίωσις [metousiosis]) is taught as strongly as words can make it."

The Encyclopedia of Eastern Orthodox Christianity states: "The Greek term metousiosis, which is comparable to the Latin transsubstantiatio, does appear in [Eastern] Orthodox liturgical and theological texts – though not as often as other vocabulary (e.g., metastoicheiosis, a "change of elements").

A. Osipov states that the Eastern Orthodox use of the Greek word μεταβολή (metabole), meaning "change", and the Russian преложение in relation to the Eucharist should not be taken as equivalent to the word "transubstantiation", which has been rendered as metousiosis. Nikolaj Uspenksij appeal to Church Fathers who, when speaking of other doctrines, drew analogies from the Eucharist and spoke of it as bread and wine, but as having also a heavenly nature.

Some Eastern Orthodox theologians thus appear to deny transubstantiation/metousiosis, but in the view of Adrian Fortescue, what they object to is the associated theory of substance and accident, and they hold that there is a real change of the bread and wine into the body and blood of Christ.

== Eastern Orthodox use of the term metousiosis ==
The first edition of The Longer Catechism of the Orthodox, Catholic, Eastern Church, known also as The Catechism of St. Philaret, did not include the term metousiosis; but it was added in the third edition: "In the exposition of the faith by the Eastern Patriarchs, it is said that the word transubstantiation is not to be taken to define the manner in which the bread and wine are changed into the Body and Blood of the Lord; for this none can understand but God; but only thus much is signified, that the bread truly, really, and substantially becomes the very true Body of the Lord, and the wine the very Blood of the Lord." The official Greek version of this passage (question 340) uses the word metousiosis.

Writing in 1929, Metropolitan of Thyatira Germanos said that an obstacle to the request for union with the Eastern Orthodox Church presented in the 17th century by some Church of England bishops was that "the Patriarchs were adamant on the question of Transubstantiation", which, in view of the Thirty-Nine Articles, the Anglican bishops did not wish to accept.

== Oriental Orthodox ==
The Coptic Orthodox Church of Alexandria does not use a term corresponding to transubstantiation/metousiosis, but it speaks of "change" and rejects the denial of "the reality of the change of the bread and wine to the body and the blood of our Lord Jesus Christ" held by memorialists such as the Plymouth Brethren.

== See also ==
- Apotheosis
- Real Presence
- Eucharistic theologies contrasted
- Eucharist
