= Impanation =

Theological idea in Christianity

Impanation (Latin: impanatio, "embodied in bread") is a high medieval theory of the real presence of the body of Jesus Christ in the consecrated bread of the Eucharist that does not imply a change in the substance of either the bread or the body. This doctrine, apparently patterned after Christ's Incarnation (God is made flesh in the Person of Jesus Christ), is the assertion that "God is made bread" in the Eucharist. Christ's divine attributes are shared by the eucharistic bread via his body. This view is similar but not identical to the theory of consubstantiation associated with Lollardy. It is considered a heresy by the Roman Catholic Church and is also rejected by classical Lutheranism. Rupert of Deutz (d. 1129) and John of Paris (d. 1306) were believed to have taught this doctrine. Among the Lutherans, it is reported that Andreas Osiander also taught this doctrine.

== See also ==
Groups associated with Impanation:

- Berengarians
- Stercoranism
