= Peter Kániš =

Bohemian Hussite priest and theologian (d. 1421)

Peter Kániš (died 1421) was a priest and theologian during the Bohemian reformation, being the chief spokesman for the Taborites. Along with other Taborites, he was burned at the stake for heresy by Jan Žižka, who wanted to control the most radical parts of the reformation. Kániš advocated the postponement of baptism until the age of thirty over infant baptism. He took a memorialist view of the Eucharist. Bishop Nicholas Biskupec wrote a treatise against him defending the real presence of Christ in the Eucharist. A few of those led by Kániš and Martin Húska would later form the Adamite sect.
