= Consubstantiation =

Christian theological doctrine

Consubstantiation is a Christian theological doctrine that (like transubstantiation) describes the real presence of Christ in the Eucharist. It holds that during the sacrament, the substance of the body and blood of Christ are present alongside the substance of the bread and wine, which remain present. It was part of the doctrines of Lollardy, and considered a heresy by the Catholic Church. It was later championed by Edward Pusey of the Oxford Movement, and is therefore held by many high church Anglicans, seemingly contrary to the Black Rubric of the Book of Common Prayer. The Irvingian Churches (such as the New Apostolic Church) adhere to consubstantiation as the explanation of the real presence of Christ in the Eucharist. Lutherans affirm the physical presence of Christ's body and blood alongside the bread and wine through a sacramental union, but typically reject the label of "consubstantiation" as an oversimplification.

== Development ==
In England in the late 14th century, there was a political and religious movement known as Lollardy. Among much broader goals, the Lollards affirmed a form of consubstantiation—that the Eucharist remained physically bread and wine, while becoming spiritually the body and blood of Christ. Lollardy survived up until the time of the English Reformation.

Whilst ultimately rejected by him on account of the authority of the Church of Rome, William of Ockham entertains a version of consubstantiation in his Fourth Quodlibet, Question 30, where he claims that "the substance of the bread and the substance of the wine remain there and that the substance of the body of Christ remains in the same place, together with the substance of the bread".

Literary critic Kenneth Burke's dramatism takes this concept and utilizes it in secular rhetorical theory to look at the dialectic of unity and difference within the context of logology.

The doctrine of consubstantiation is often held in contrast to the doctrine of transubstantiation.

To explain the manner of Christ's presence in Holy Communion, many high church Anglicans teach the philosophical explanation of consubstantiation. A major leader in the Anglo-Catholic Oxford Movement, Edward Pusey, championed the view of consubstantiation. Pusey's view is that:

I cannot deem it unfair to apply the name of Consubstantiation to a doctrine which teaches, that "the true flesh and true blood of Christ are in the true bread and wine", in such a way that "whatsoever motion or action the bread" and wine have, the body and blood "of Christ also" have "the same"; and that "the substances in both cases" are "so mingled—that they should constitute some one thing".

The Irvingian Churches adhere to the doctrine of consubstantiation; for example, The Catechism of the New Apostolic Church states:

The elements of bread and wine are not transformed in their substance through the consecration and pronouncement of the words of institution. Rather, the substance of Christ's body and blood is joined to them (consubstantiation). There is thus no transformation of the substances (transubstantiation). There is a close connection between Holy Communion and the fact that Jesus Christ has both a human and a divine nature, both of which exist unadulterated and indivisible in Him (see 3.4). It is in this sense that the relationship between the bread and wine and the body and blood of Christ is to be understood: after the consecration, a parallel exists between the "bread and wine"—which corresponds to the human nature of Christ—and the "body and blood"—which corresponds to the divine nature of Christ. In Holy Communion, bread and wine correspond to the human nature of Christ, while the body and blood correspond to His divine nature. Accordingly, there can be no transubstantiation of the bread and wine. Rather, even after consecration, the bread and wine retain their natural substance. Yet the bread and wine are not merely metaphors or symbols for the body and blood of Christ. Rather, the body and blood of Christ are truly present (real presence). Through the words of consecration spoken by an Apostle or a priestly minister commissioned by him, the substance of the body and blood of Christ is joined to the substance of the bread and wine. The outward form (accidence) of the elements of Holy Communion is not changed by this act. Just as the Man Jesus was visible during His life on earth, so also the bread and wine are visible in Holy Communion. After their consecration, however, the elements of Holy Communion constitute a dual substance—like the two natures of Jesus Christ—namely that of bread and wine and that of the body and blood of Christ. The Son of God is then truly present in the elements of Holy Communion: in His divinity and in His humanity. However, as regards the elements of Communion it is not the case that the bread alone corresponds to the body of Christ and that the wine alone corresponds to the blood of Christ. Rather, the body and blood of Christ is completely present in each of the two elements, both the bread and the wine.

The term consubstantiation has been used to describe Martin Luther's Eucharistic doctrine, the sacramental union. Lutheran theologians reject the term consubstantiation because it refers to a philosophical construct that they believe differs from the Lutheran doctrine of the sacramental union, denotes a mixing of substances (bread and wine with body and blood), and suggests a "gross, Capernaitic, carnal" presence of the body and blood of Christ.

== See also ==
- Eucharistic theology
- Impanation
- Real presence of Christ in the Eucharist
- Transignification
