= Concomitance (doctrine) =

Eucharistic theological doctrine

The Doctrine of Concomitance is a Eucharistic theological doctrine held by many (generally Western) Christians which describes the nature of Christ's presence in the consecrated bread and wine of the sacrament of Eucharist.

== Doctrine ==
The doctrine states that since Christ is indivisible, no one part of Christ's substance can be divided. Thus, Christ's body can not be separated from his blood which means that Christ's full presence is in each element fully.

== Use ==
The Doctrine of Concomitance has been used to justify communion under one kind of species, saying that the Christ is fully present in each species alone. Further application allows those who are allergic to gluten, are alcoholics, or otherwise wish to abstain from alcohol consumption to receive one species alone with the assurance of the fullness of the sacrament. Historically, this application contributed to the 1415 ruling by the Council of Constance that the laity should be given only the bread at communion.
