= Stercoranism =

Heretical belief about the Eucharist

Stercoranism (from stercus, "dung") is a supposed belief or doctrine attributed reciprocally to the other side by those who in the eleventh century upheld and those who denied the Roman Catholic doctrine of transubstantiation, that the bread and wine offered in the Eucharist become in substance, but not in form, the body and blood of Jesus Christ.

Adherents of transubstantiation accused those who believed in a solely spiritual presence of Christ in the Eucharist of asserting that what is presented as the body and blood of Christ is no more than what subsequently is subject to the normal digestive processes after ingestion, eventually passing through the intestines and being excreted through defecation. Conversely, opponents of transubstantiation accused its believers of the same, based on the pretext that the Eucharist, upon being transubstantiated into the body of Christ and then eaten, would be subjected to such digestive processes, thus implying that the flesh of Christ is turned into feces.

On this, see the explanation given by the Protestant theologian and historian Johann Lorenz von Mosheim, who calls it an "imaginary heresy".

== Later attributions to believers in transubstantiation ==
While Mosheim considered that nobody really held the belief in stercoranism that their opponents charged them with, the charge has been repeated by opponents of the doctrine of transubstantiation.

The accusation was made in the 17th century by French writer Jean Claude, and is still made in the 21st century by Larry Ball in his Escape from Paganism: How a Roman Catholic Can Be Saved.

Karl August von Hase said that early Church theologians, such as Origen (184–253), were willing to allow that the consecrated elements of Christ's body were digested and excreted in the manner of typical food.

== Catholic Church doctrine ==
The Catechism of the Catholic Church states: "The Eucharistic presence of Christ begins at the moment of the consecration and endures as long as the Eucharistic species subsist. Christ is present whole and entire in each of the species and whole and entire in each of their parts, in such a way that the breaking of the bread does not divide Christ."

Thus, in the judgment of the Catholic Church, when the sacramental signs of bread and wine are changed out of existence, the body and blood of Christ that they point to is no longer there: "The Sacrament of the Eucharist is the body and blood of Christ really present under the appearances of bread and wine; if the appearances cease to be present, then the sacrament no longer exists, and so the Real Presence ceases."

In relation to the process of digestion, the Catholic Church's teaching has been expressed in this way: "The substance of Christ's body is not subject to processes of digestion or to any chemical reactions. The qualities of bread of course behave in their normal way, undergoing a change as they are affected by digestion. Our Lord's substantial presence ceases as these qualities cease to retain those characteristics proper to bread."

== See also ==
- Eucharistic theology – Branch of Christian theology
- History of Catholic eucharistic theology – Catholic sacrament
- Real presence of Christ in the Eucharist – Doctrine that Jesus Christ is truly present
- Receptionism – Religious doctrine
- Sacrament – Christian rite recognized as of particular importance and significance
- Transubstantiation – Catholic sacramental doctrine
