= Memorialism =

Christian theological view of the Eucharist

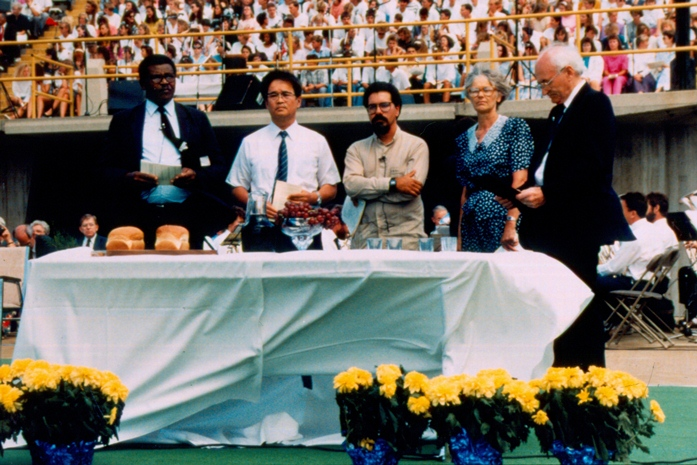
Mennonites, an Anabaptist denomination, celebrating the Lord's Supper

Memorialism is the belief held by some Christian denominations that the elements of bread and wine (or grape juice) in the Eucharist (more often referred to as "the Lord's Supper" by memorialists) are purely symbolic representations of the body and blood of Jesus Christ, the feast being established only or primarily as a commemorative ceremony. The term comes from the Gospel of Luke 22:19: "Do this in remembrance of me", and the attendant interpretation that the Lord's Supper's chief purpose is to help the participant prayerfully remember Jesus and his sacrifice on the Cross, and symbolically renew commitment.

This viewpoint is commonly held by Unitarians, Anabaptists, the Plymouth Brethren, many Restorationist denominations (such as Jehovah's Witnesses), some Baptists, Pentecostals, and most Non-denominational churches, as well as those identifying with liberal Christianity.

It is not held by most branches of Christianity, who affirm various doctrines, generally referred to as real presence.

== History ==
=== Early Christianity ===
While many Church Fathers imply a real presence of Christ in Holy Communion, Clement of Alexandria and Tertullian used the word "symbol" to define the Eucharist: "the Holy Scripture named wine a mystical symbol of the holy blood (Clement of Alexandria)", and interpret John 6:53-56 to be about allegories about faith. However, it is disputed if Clement held a symbolic view of the Eucharist, and some have argued that Tertullian held to a view of spiritual presence in the Eucharist.

=== Medieval ===
Many of the Waldensians rejected a real presence in the Lord's Supper, seeing it as a symbol. The same view was held by Peter Kániš who held to memorialism, against whom Bishop Nicholas wrote a treatise defending the real presence of Christ in the Eucharist against him.

Pico della Mirandola argued that Christ is not literally present in the Eucharist but instead it is symbolic of the blood and body of Christ.

=== Huldrych Zwingli ===
The theology of Huldrych Zwingli, a Protestant Reformer of Switzerland, is commonly associated with memorialism. Zwingli, who was a former Roman Catholic priest, affirmed that Christ is truly (though not naturally) present to the believer in the sacrament or amid a Christian congregation that remembers with strong intensity the events of the Last Supper through the power of God. However, the sacrament - for Zwingli - is not used instrumentally to communicate with Christ, as John Calvin taught.

Zwingli argued that the Eucharist is more about the presence of Christ in the minds of people instead of his presence in the elements. This indicates that, although its liturgies remain an important aspect of being a Christian, its potential benefits are not found in any metaphysical interpretation related to the bread and wine used in the ritual.

In addition, unlike Lutheran theology that upholds a sacramental union, Zwingli maintained that the Scripture and the creeds support the idea that Christ sits at the right hand of God the Father in heaven.

=== Anabaptism ===
Anabaptists (inclusive of Mennonites, Amish, Hutterites, Bruderhof, Schwarzenau Brethren, River Brethren and Apostolic Christians) affirm memorialism and locate the presence of Jesus not in the eucharistic elements themselves, but teach that the "mystery of communion with the living Christ in his Supper comes into being by the power of the Spirit, dwelling in and working through the collected members of Christ’s Body". As such, in celebrations of Holy Communion, "Anabaptist congregations looked to the living Christ in their hearts and in their midst, who transformed members and elements together into a mysterious communion, creating his Body in many members, ground like grains and crushed like grapes, into one bread and one drink."

=== Unitarianism ===
The Racovian Catechism, which explicates the Unitarian Christian faith from a Socinian perspective, declares of the Lord's Supper that "this rite is to be observed for the purpose of commemorating or showing forth the kindness manifested by Christ towards us, and no other end besides this is intimated by Christ".
