= Real presence of Christ in the Eucharist =

Doctrine that Jesus Christ is truly present

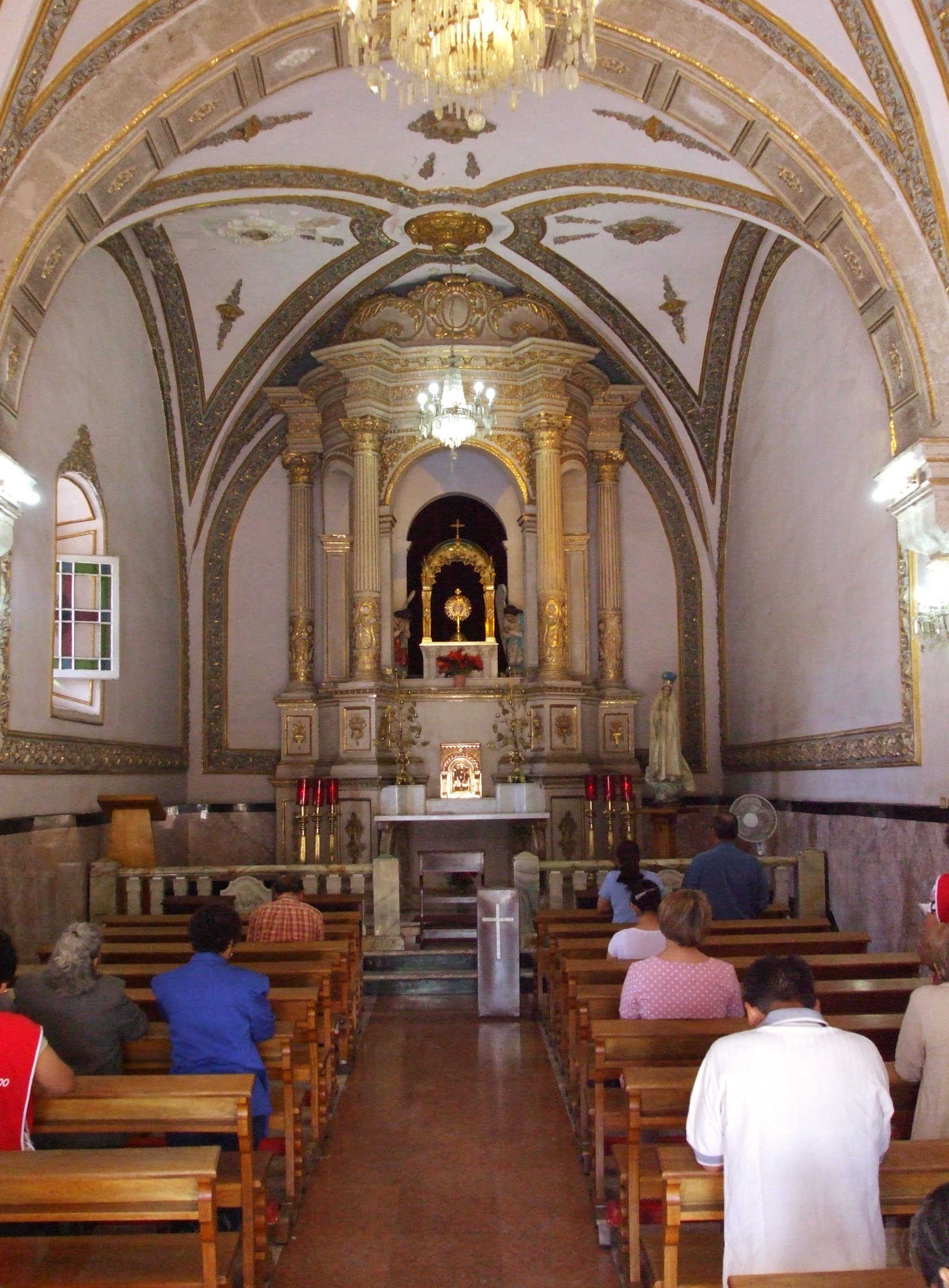
Catholics give adoration to Christ, whom they believe to be really present, in body and blood, soul and divinity, in sacramental bread whose reality has been changed into that of his body.

There are a number of Christian denominations that teach that Jesus Christ is truly present in the Eucharist, not merely symbolically or metaphorically. These denominations include Catholic, Eastern Orthodox, Oriental Orthodox, Eastern Syriac, Moravian, Lutheran, Anglican, Methodist, Reformed (Continental Reformed, Presbyterian, Congregationalist, Reformed Baptist, Calvinistic Methodist, Reformed Anglican and Waldensian traditions), and Irvingian traditions, along with some Churches of Christ. The differences in the teachings of these churches primarily concern "the mode of Christ's presence in the Lord's Supper", i.e. whether it is substantially or spiritually present.

Efforts at mutual understanding of the range of beliefs by these churches led in the 1980s to consultations on Baptism, Eucharist and Ministry by the World Council of Churches.

The Real Presence is rejected by other Christians who see the Lord's Supper as purely a memorial, including the Plymouth Brethren, Unitarians, non-denominational Christian churches, as well as some of those identifying with liberal Christianity and segments of the Restoration Movement.

== History ==
The real presence of Christ in the Eucharist has been believed since very ancient times. Early Christian writers referred to the Eucharistic elements as Jesus's body and the blood.

The short document known as the Teachings of the Apostles or Didache, which may be the earliest Christian document outside of the New Testament to speak of the Eucharist, says, "Let no one eat or drink of your Eucharist, unless they have been baptized into the name of the Lord; for concerning this also the Lord has said, 'Give not that which is holy to the dogs'."

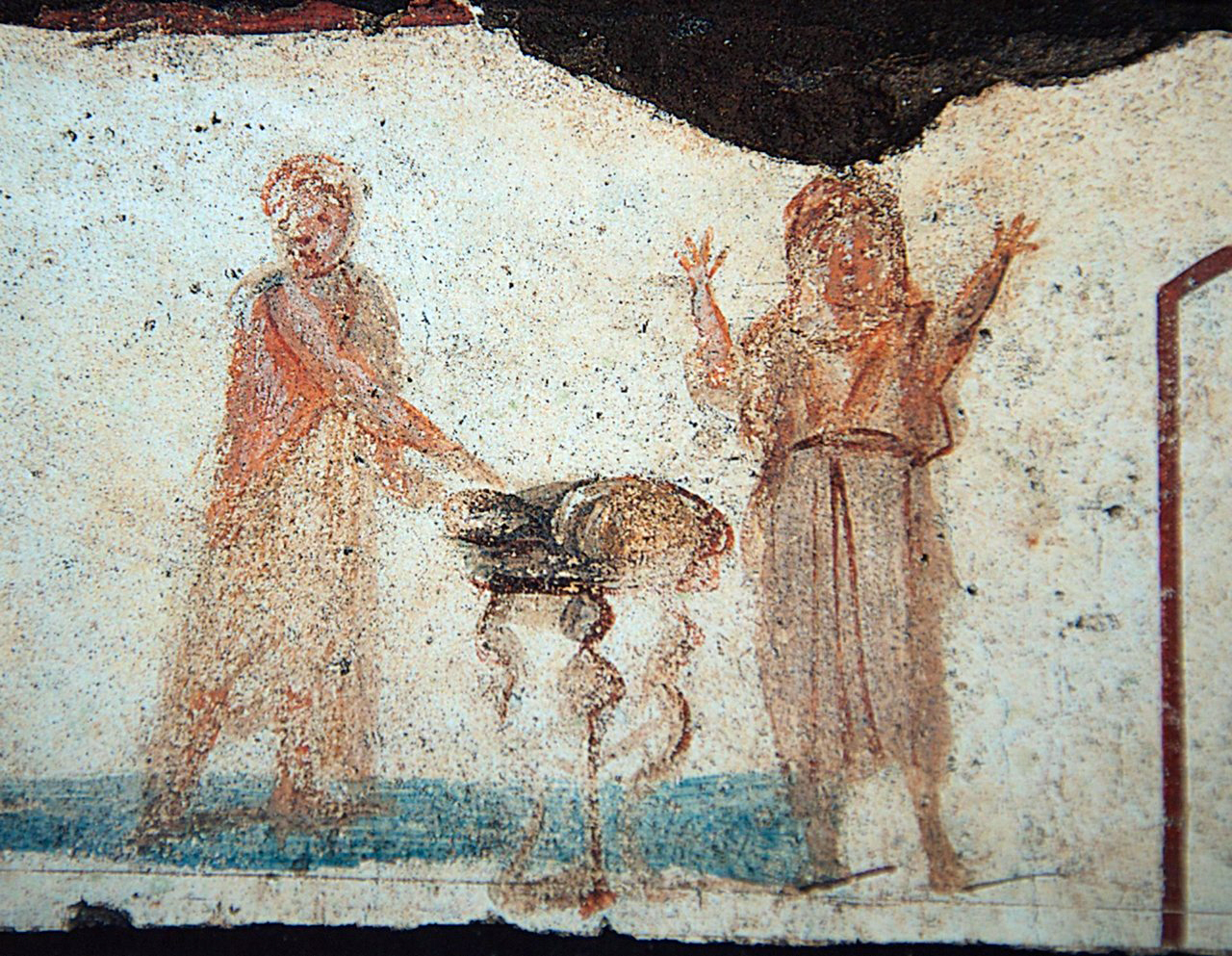
A 3rd-century fresco in the Catacomb of Callixtus, interpreted by the archaeologist Joseph Wilpert as showing on the left Jesus multiplying bread and fish, a symbol of the Eucharistic consecration, and on the right a representation of the deceased, who through participation in the Eucharist has obtained eternal happiness

Ignatius of Antioch, writing in about AD 106 to the Roman Christians, says: "I desire the bread of God, the heavenly bread, the bread of life, which is the flesh of Jesus Christ, the Son of God, who became afterwards of the seed of David and Abraham; and I desire the drink of God, namely his blood, which is incorruptible love and eternal life."

Writing to the Christians of Smyrna in the same year, he warned them to "stand aloof from such heretics", because, among other reasons, "they abstain from the Eucharist and from prayer, because they confess not the Eucharist to be the flesh of our Saviour Jesus Christ, which suffered for our sins, and which the Father, of his goodness, raised up again."

In about AD 150, Justin Martyr, referring to the Eucharist, wrote in his First Apology: "Not as common bread and common drink do we receive these; but in like manner as Jesus Christ our Savior, having been made flesh by the Word of God, had both flesh and blood for our salvation, so likewise have we been taught that the food which is blessed by the prayer of his word, and from which our blood and flesh by transmutation are nourished, is the flesh and blood of that Jesus who was made flesh."

In about AD 200, Tertullian wrote: "Having taken the bread and given it to his disciples, He made it his own body, by saying, This is my body, that is, the figure of my body. A figure, however, there could not have been, unless there were first a veritable body. An empty thing, or phantom, is incapable of a figure. If, however, (as Marcion might say) He pretended the bread was his body, because He lacked the truth of bodily substance, it follows that He must have given bread for us."

The Apostolic Constitutions (compiled c. 380) says: "Let the bishop give the oblation, saying, The body of Christ; and let him that receiveth say, Amen. And let the deacon take the cup; and when he gives it, say, The blood of Christ, the cup of life; and let him that drinketh say, Amen."

Ambrose of Milan (died 397) wrote:

Perhaps you will say, "I see something else, how is it that you assert that I receive the Body of Christ?" ... Let us prove that this is not what nature made, but what the blessing consecrated, and the power of blessing is greater than that of nature, because by blessing nature itself is changed. ... For that sacrament which you receive is made what it is by the word of Christ. But if the word of Elijah had such power as to bring down fire from heaven, shall not the word of Christ have power to change the nature of the elements? ... Why do you seek the order of nature in the Body of Christ, seeing that the Lord Jesus Himself was born of a Virgin, not according to nature? It is the true Flesh of Christ which was crucified and buried, this is then truly the Sacrament of His Body. The Lord Jesus Himself proclaims: "This Is My Body." Before the blessing of the heavenly words another nature is spoken of, after the consecration the Body is signified. He Himself speaks of His Blood. Before the consecration it has another name, after it is called Blood. And you say, Amen, that is, It is true. Let the heart within confess what the mouth utters, let the soul feel what the voice speaks.

Other fourth-century Christian writers say that in the Eucharist there occurs a "change", "transelementation", "transformation", "transposing", "alteration" of the bread into the body of Christ.

Augustine declares that the bread consecrated in the Eucharist actually "becomes" (in Latin, fit) the Body of Christ: "The faithful know what I'm talking about; they know Christ in the breaking of bread. It isn't every loaf of bread, you see, but the one receiving Christ's blessing, that becomes the body of Christ."

In the 9th century, Charles the Bald posed two unclearly formulated questions: whether the faithful receive the body of Christ in mystery or in truth and whether the body is the same that was born of Mary and suffered on the cross. Ratramnus understood "in truth" to mean simply "what is perceptible to the senses", "plain unvarnished reality" (rei manifestae demonstratio), and declared that the consecration leaves the bread and wine unchanged in their outward appearance and thus, insofar as these are signs of the body and blood of Christ hidden under the veil of the signs, the faithful receive the body of Christ not in veritate, but in figura, in mysterio, in virtute (figure, mystery, power). Ratramnus opposed Capharnaitic tendencies but in no way betrayed a symbolist understanding such as that of 11th-century Berengarius. Radbertus, on the other hand, developed the realism of the Gallican and Roman liturgy and the Ambrosian theology of the identity of the sacramental and historical body of the Lord. The dispute ended with Radbertus's letter to Frudiger, in which he stressed further the identity of the sacramental and historical body of Christ, but met the opposing view to the extent of emphasizing the spiritual nature of the sacramental body. Friedrich Kempf comments: "Since Paschasius had identified the Eucharistic and the historical body of the Lord without more precisely explaining the Eucharistic species, his teaching could and probably did promote a grossly materialistic 'Capharnaitic' interpretation".

The question of the nature of the Eucharist became virulent for a second time in the Western Church in the 11th century, when Berengar of Tours denied that any material change in the elements was needed to explain the Eucharistic presence. This caused a controversy which led to the explicit clarification of the Catholic doctrine of the Eucharist.

In 1215, the Fourth Lateran Council used the word transubstantiated in its profession of faith, when speaking of the change that takes place in the Eucharist.

It was only later in the 13th century that Aristotelian metaphysics was accepted and a philosophical elaboration in line with that metaphysics was developed, which found classic formulation in the teaching of Saint Thomas Aquinas. It was only then that Scholasticism cast Christian theology in the terms of Aristotelianism. The metaphysical aspects of the real presence of Christ in the Eucharist were firstly described since the time of the Latin juvenile treatise titled De venerabili sacramento altaris (On the reverend sacrament of the altar).

During the later medieval period, the question was debated within the Western Church. Following the Protestant Reformation, it became a central topic of division amongst the various emerging confessions. The Lutheran doctrine of the real presence, known as the "sacramental union", was formulated in the Augsburg Confession of 1530. Luther decidedly supported this doctrine, publishing The Sacrament of the Body and Blood of Christ—Against the Fanatics in 1526. Saying that "bread and body are two distinct substances", he declared that "out of two kinds of objects a union has taken place, which I shall call a 'sacramental union'".

Thus, the main theological division in this question, turned out to be not between Catholicism and Protestantism, but within Protestantism, especially between Luther and Zwingli, who discussed the question at the Marburg Colloquy of 1529 but who failed to come to an agreement. Zwingli's view became associated with the term Memorialism, suggesting an understanding of the Eucharist held purely "in memory of" Christ. While this accurately describes the position of the Anabaptists and derived traditions, it is not the position held by Zwingli himself, who affirmed that Christ is truly (in substance), though not naturally (physically) present in the sacrament. The Reformed tradition (Continental Reformed, Presbyterian, Congregationalist and Reformed Anglican denominations) embraced the view of the real spiritual presence as taught by John Calvin and Heinrich Bullinger.

The position of the Church of England on this matter (the real presence) is clear and highlighted in the Thirty-nine Articles of Religion:

The supper of the Lord is not only a sign of the love that Christians ought to have among themselves; but rather is a Sacrament of our redemption by Christ's death: insomuch that to those who rightly and with faith, receive the same, the bread that we break is a partaking of the body of Christ, likewise the cup of blessing is a partaking of the blood of Christ. Transubstantiation (or the change of the substance of Bread and Wine) in the supper of the Lord, cannot be proved by Holy Writ; but is repugnant to the plain words of scripture, overthroweth the nature of the Sacrament and hath given occasion to many superstitions. The Body of Christ is given, taken and eaten in the Supper, only after an Heavenly and spiritual manner. And the mean whereby the Body of Christ is received and eaten in the Supper is Faith. The Sacrament of the Lord's Supper was not by Christ's ordinance reserved, carried about, lifted up or worshipped.

— Articles of Religion No.28 "The Lord's Supper": Book of Common Prayer 1662

The Council of Trent, held 1545–1563 in reaction to the Protestant Reformation and initiating the Catholic Counter-Reformation, promulgated the view of the presence of Christ in the Eucharist as true, real, and substantial, and declared that, "by the consecration of the bread and of the wine, a conversion is made of the whole substance of the bread into the substance (substantia) of the body of Christ our Lord, and of the whole substance of the wine into the substance of his blood; which conversion is, by the holy Catholic Church, suitably and properly called Transubstantiation". The Scholastic, Aristotelian philosophy of substance was not included in the Council's definitive teaching, but rather the more general idea of "substance" that had predated Thomas Aquinas.

Eastern Orthodoxy did not become involved in the dispute prior to the 17th century. It became virulent in 1629, when Cyril Lucaris denied the doctrine of transubstantiation, using the Greek translation metousiosis for the concept. To counter the teaching of Lucaris, Metropolitan Petro Mohyla of Kiev drew up in Latin an Orthodox Confession in defense of transubstantiation. This Confession was approved by all the Greek-speaking Patriarchs (those of Constantinople, Alexandria, Antioch, and Jerusalem) in 1643, and again by the 1672 Synod of Jerusalem (also referred to as the Council of Bethlehem).

== Views ==
=== Catholic ===
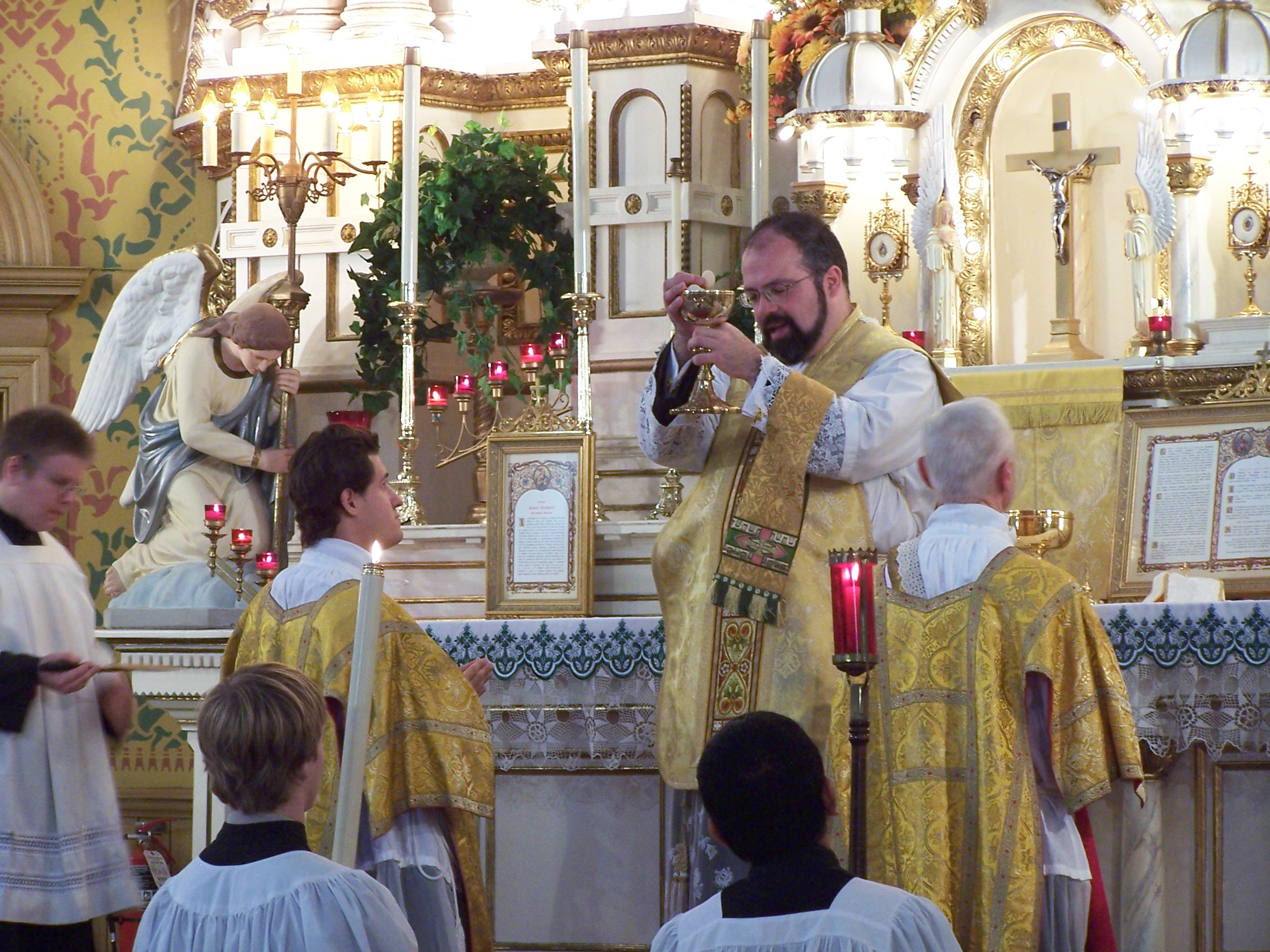
Ecce Agnus Dei ("Behold the Lamb of God") at Solemn Mass

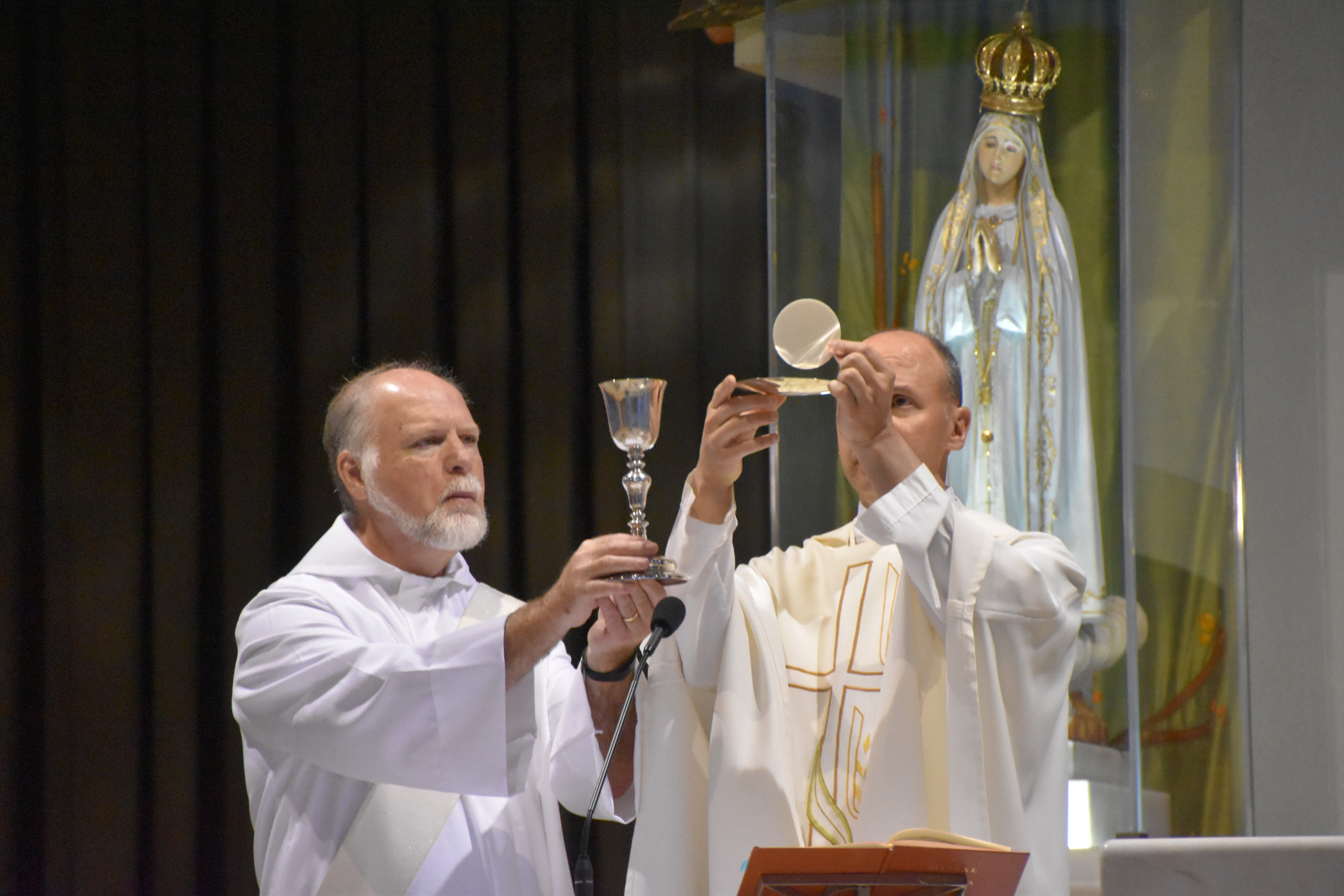
Eucharistic celebration at the Sanctuary of Our Lady of Fatima

The Catholic Church declares that the presence of Christ in the Eucharist is true, real, and substantial. By saying Christ is truly present in the Eucharist, it excludes any understanding of the presence as merely that of a sign or figure. By stating that his presence in the Eucharist is real, it defines it as objective and independent of the thoughts and feelings of the participants, whether they have faith or not: lack of faith may make reception of the sacrament fruitless for holiness, but it does not make his presence unreal. In the third place, the Catholic Church describes the presence of Christ in the Eucharist as substantial, that is, involving the underlying substance, not the appearances of bread and wine. These maintain all their physical properties as before: unlike what happens when the appearance of something or somebody is altered but the basic reality remains the same, it is the teaching of the Catholic Church that in the Eucharist the appearance is quite unchanged, but the basic reality has become the body and blood of Christ.

The change from bread and wine to a presence of Christ that is true, real, and substantial is called transubstantiation. The Catholic Church does not consider the term "transubstantiation" an explanation of the change: it declares that the change by which the signs of bread and wine become the body and blood of Christ occurs "in a way surpassing understanding".

One hymn of the Church, "Ave Verum Corpus", greets Christ in the Eucharist as follows (in translation from the original Latin): "Hail, true body, born of Mary Virgin, and which truly suffered and was immolated on the cross for mankind!"

The Catholic Church also holds that the presence of Christ in the Eucharist is entire: it does not see what is really in the Eucharist as a lifeless corpse and mere blood, but as the whole Christ, body and blood, soul and divinity; nor does it see the persisting outward appearances of bread and wine and their properties (such as weight and nutritional value) as a mere illusion, but objectively existing as before and unchanged.

In the view of the Catholic Church, the presence of Christ in the Eucharist is of an order different from the presence of Christ in the other sacraments: in the other sacraments he is present by his power rather than by the reality of his body and blood, the basis of the description of his presence as "real".

=== Eastern Orthodox, Oriental Orthodox and Assyrian ===
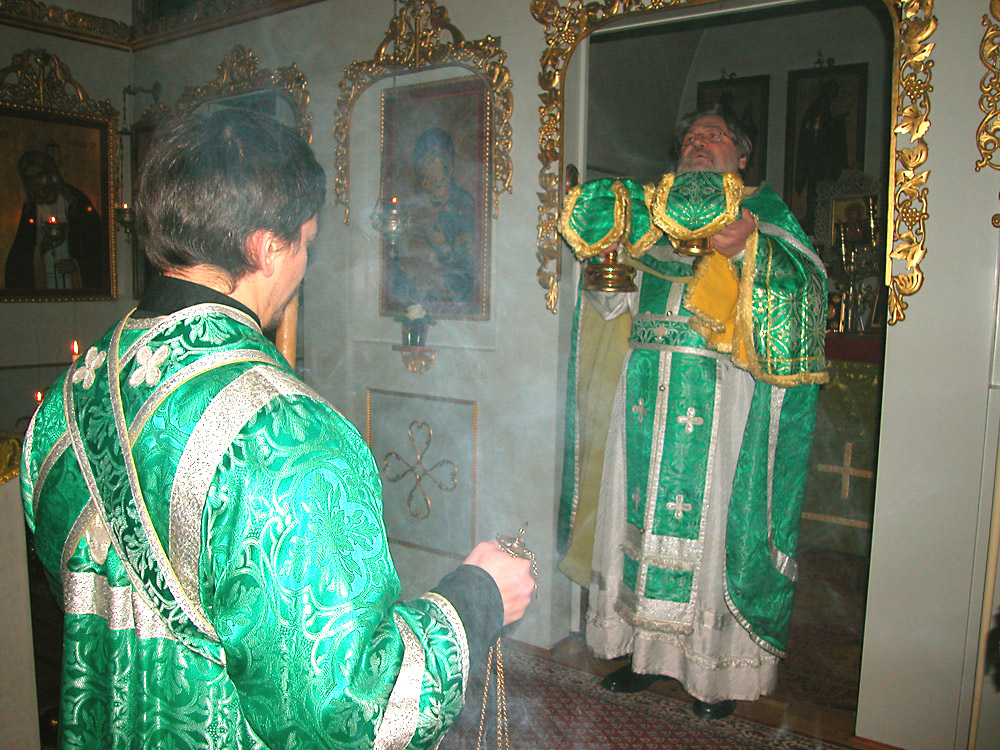
Eastern Orthodox Divine Liturgy

The Eastern Orthodox Churches and the Oriental Orthodox Churches, as well as the Churches of the East, believe that in the Eucharist the bread and wine are objectively changed and become in a real sense the Body and Blood of Christ. Orthodoxy rejects philosophical explanations of the change that occurs in the elements during the Divine Liturgy:

While the Orthodox Church has often employed the term transubstantiation, Kallistos Ware claims the term "enjoys no unique or decisive authority" in the Orthodox Church. Nor does its use in the Orthodox Church "commit theologians to the acceptance of Aristotelian philosophical concepts". ...Ware also notes that while the Orthodox have always "insisted on the reality of the change" from bread and wine into the body and the blood of Christ at the consecration of the elements, the Orthodox have "never attempted to explain the manner of the change." —Brad Harper and Paul Louis Metzger

The Greek term metousiosis (μετουσίωσις) is sometimes used by Eastern Orthodox Christians to describe the change since this term "is not bound up with the scholastic theory of substance and accidents", but it does not have official status as "a dogma of the Orthodox Communion." Similarly, Coptic Orthodox Christians, a denomination of Oriental Orthodox Christianity, "are fearful of using philosophical terms concerning the real presence of Christ in the Eucharist, preferring uncritical appeals to biblical passages like 1 Cor. 10.16; 11.23–29 or the discourse in John 6.26–58."

While the Catholic Church believes that the change "takes place at the words of institution or consecration", the Eastern Orthodox Church teaches that the "change takes place anywhere between the Proskomedia (the Liturgy of Preparation)" and "the Epiklesis ('calling down'), or invocation of the Holy Spirit 'upon us and upon these gifts here set forth'". Therefore, it teaches that "the gifts should be treated with reverence throughout the entirety of the service. We don't know the exact time in which the change takes place, and this is left to mystery."

The words of the Coptic liturgy are representative of the faith of Oriental Orthodoxy: "I believe, I believe, I believe and profess to the last breath that this is the body and the blood of our Lord God and Saviour Jesus Christ, which he took from our Lady, the holy and immaculate Virgin Mary, the Mother of God."

The Eastern Orthodox Church's Synod of Jerusalem declared:

"We believe the Lord Jesus Christ to be present, not typically, nor figuratively, nor by superabundant grace, as in the other Mysteries... but truly and really, so that after the consecration of the bread and of the wine, the bread is transmuted, transubstantiated, converted and transformed into the true Body Itself of the Lord, Which was born in Bethlehem of the ever-Virgin Mary, was baptised in the Jordan, suffered, was buried, rose again, was received up, sitteth at the right hand of the God and Father, and is to come again in the clouds of Heaven; and the wine is converted and transubstantiated into the true Blood Itself of the Lord, Which, as He hung upon the Cross, was poured out for the life of the world."

=== Evangelical-Lutheran ===
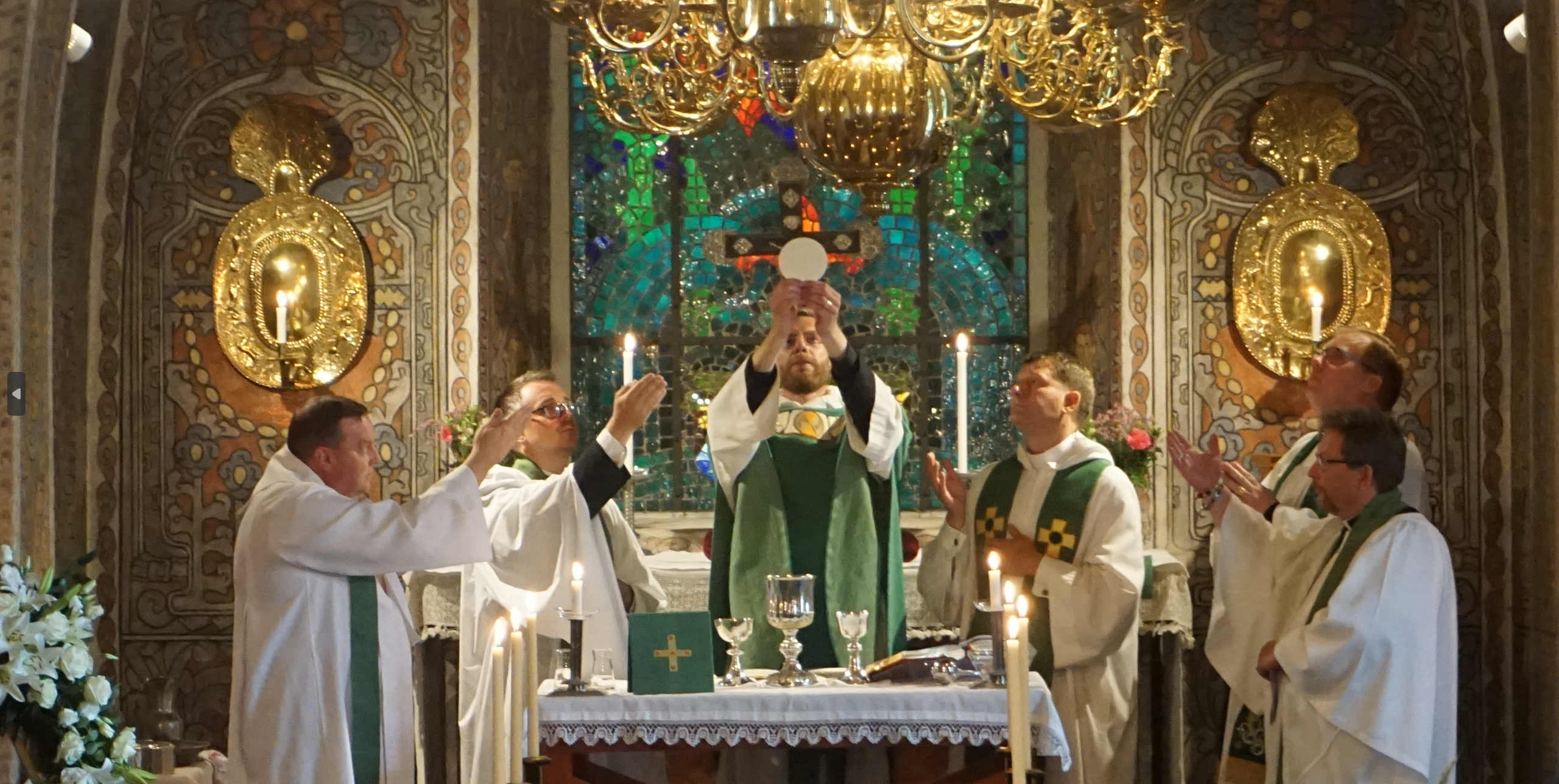
Lutheran priest elevating the host during the Holy Mass at Alsike Church, Sweden

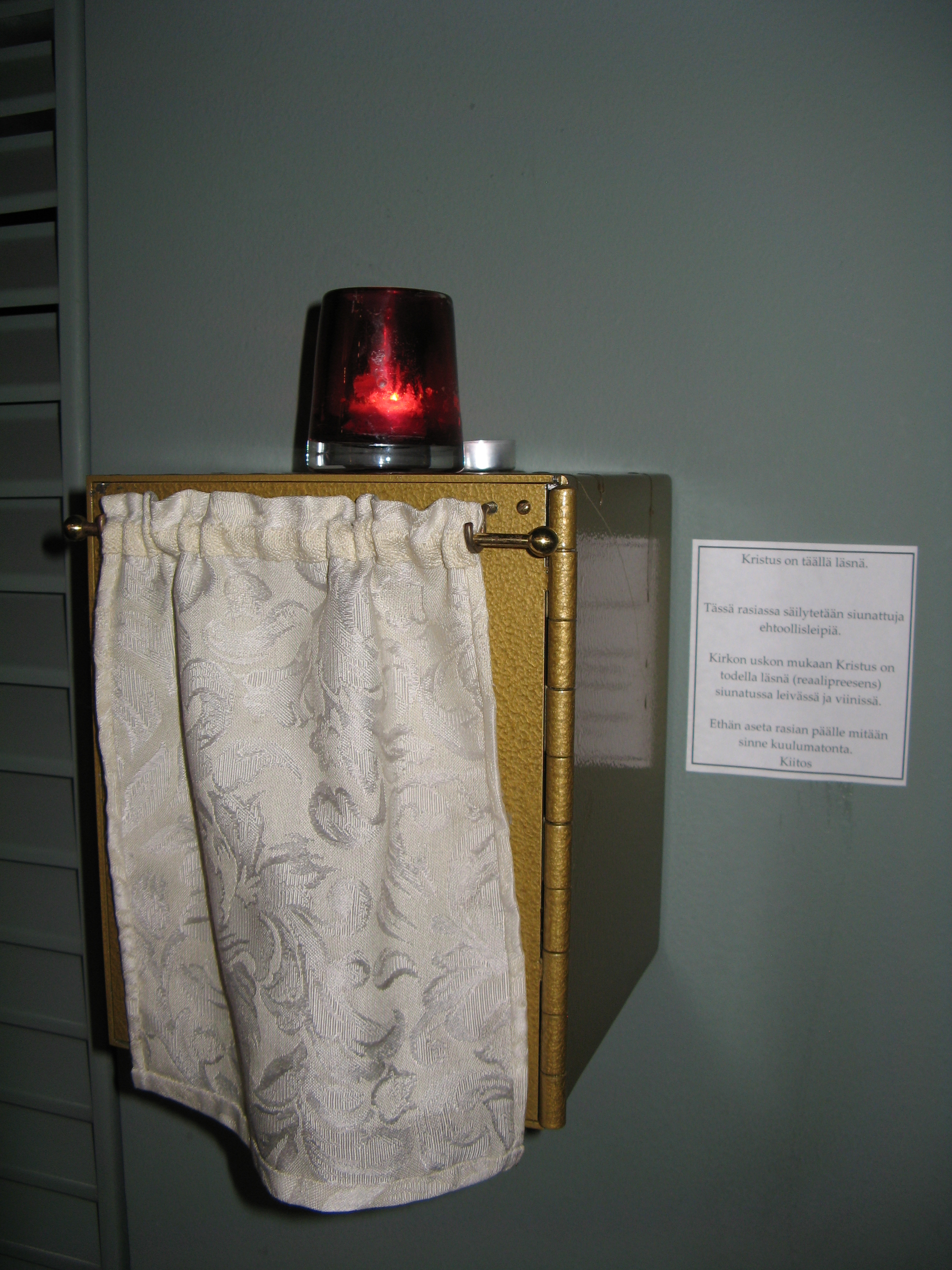
A notice about the real presence of Christ in the Eucharist in Mikael Agricola Church, Helsinki

Lutherans believe in the real presence of the body and blood of Christ in the Eucharist, that the body and blood of Christ are "truly and substantially present in, with and under the forms" of the consecrated bread and wine (the elements), so that communicants orally eat and drink the holy body and blood of Christ Himself as well as the bread and wine (cf. Augsburg Confession, Article 10) in this Sacrament. In the eucharist, Evangelical-Lutherans teach that "the whole living Christ is present in either part of the sacrament" (Apology of the Augsburg Confession, Prima Adumbratio).

The Lutheran doctrine of the real presence is more accurately and formally known as "the Sacramental Union." It has been inaccurately called "consubstantiation", a term which is specifically rejected by most Lutheran churches and theologians since it creates confusion about the actual doctrine, and it subjects the doctrine to the control of an abiblical philosophical concept in the same manner as, in their view, does the term "transubstantiation". The real presence of Christ is effected when the priest (pastor) pronounces the Words of Institution in the Mass. Lutherans affirm that the Sacrifice of the Mass (sacrificium eucharistikon) is a sacrifice of thanksgiving and praise (sacrificium laudis). The Eucharistic sacrifice remits sins, according to Lutheran theology.

For Lutherans, there is no Sacrament unless the elements are used according to Christ's institution (consecration, distribution, and reception). This was first articulated in the Wittenberg Concord of 1536 in the formula: Nihil habet rationem sacramenti extra usum a Christo institutum ("Nothing has the character of a sacrament apart from the use instituted by Christ"). Some Lutherans use this formula as their rationale for opposing in the church the reservation of the consecrated elements, private Masses, and the belief that the reliquæ (what remains of the consecrated elements after all have communed in the worship service) are still sacramentally united to the Body and Blood of Christ. This interpretation is not universal among Lutherans: the consecrated elements are treated with reverence; and, in some Lutheran churches, are reserved as in Orthodox and Catholic practice. The external Eucharistic adoration is usually not practiced by most Lutherans except for bowing, genuflecting, and kneeling to receive the Eucharist from the Words of Institution and elevation to reception of the holy meal. The reliquæ traditionally are consumed by the celebrant after the people have communed, except that a small amount may be reserved for delivery to those too ill or infirm to attend the service. In this case, the consecrated elements are to be delivered quickly, preserving the connection between the communion of the ill person and that of the congregation gathered in public Divine Service (Mass).

Lutherans use the terms "in, with and under the forms of consecrated bread and wine" and "Sacramental Union" to distinguish their understanding of the Eucharist from those of the Reformed and other traditions.

=== Moravian ===
Nicolaus Zinzendorf, a bishop of the Moravian Church, stated that Holy Communion is the "most intimate of all connection with the person of the Saviour". The Moravian Church adheres to a view known as the "sacramental presence", teaching that in the sacrament of Holy Communion:

Christ gives his body and blood according to his promise to all who partake of the elements. When we eat and drink the bread and the wine of the Supper with expectant faith, we thereby have communion with the body and blood of our Lord and receive the forgiveness of sins, life, and salvation. In this sense, the bread and wine are rightly said to be Christ's body and blood which he gives to his disciples.

— Lydia Veliko, Jeffrey Gross, Growing Consensus II: Church Dialogues in the United States, 1992–2004, page 90

=== Reformed ===
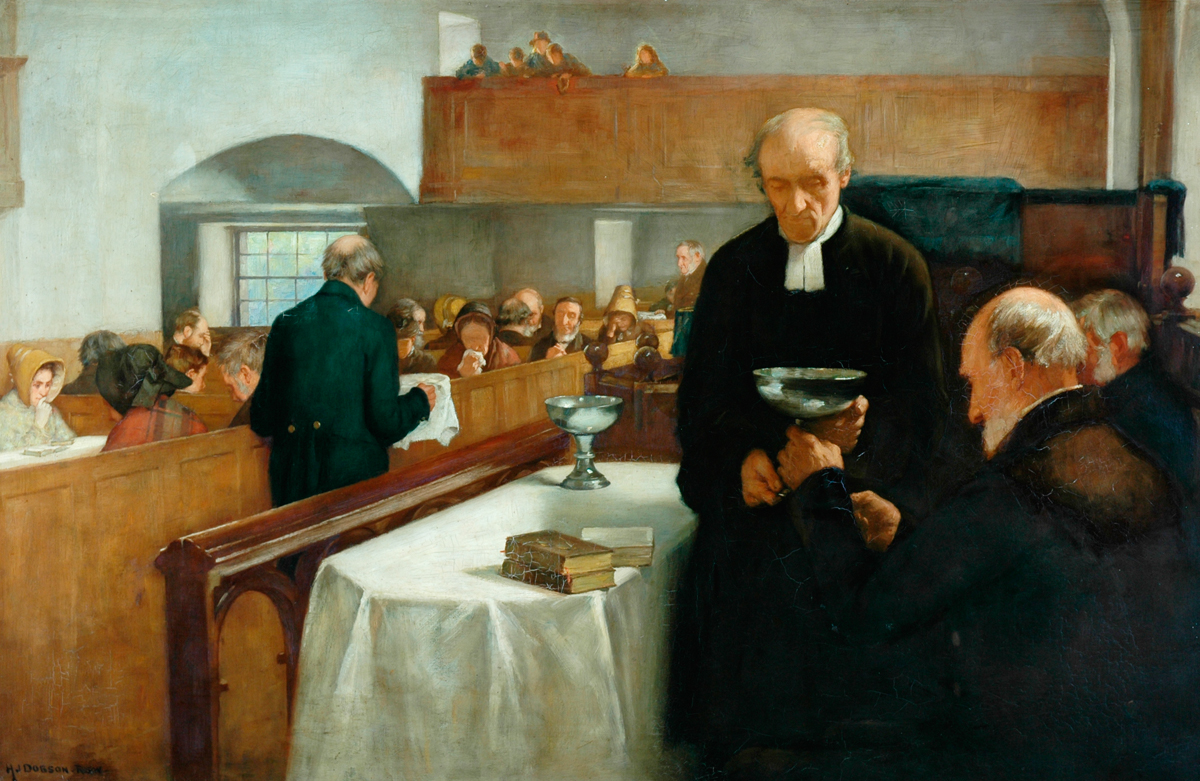
A Scottish Sacrament, by Henry John Dobson

Those in the Reformed tradition (inclusive of Continental Reformed, Presbyterian, Congregationalist, Reformed Anglican/Reformed Episcopal and Reformed Baptist churches), particularly those following John Calvin, hold that the reality of Christ's body and blood do not come corporally (physically) to the elements, but that "the Spirit truly unites things separated in space" (Calvin). This view is known as the real spiritual presence, spiritual presence, or pneumatic presence of Christ in the Lord's Supper.

Following a phrase of Saint Augustine, the Calvinist view is that "no one bears away from this Sacrament more than is gathered with the vessel of faith". "The flesh and blood of Christ are no less truly given to the unworthy than to God's elect believers", Calvin said; but those who partake by faith receive benefit from Christ, and the unbelieving are condemned by partaking. By faith (not a mere mental apprehension), and in the Holy Spirit, the partaker beholds God incarnate, and in the same sense touches him with hands, so that by eating and drinking of bread and wine Christ's presence penetrates to the heart of the believer more nearly than food swallowed with the mouth can enter in.

This view holds that the elements may be disposed of without ceremony, as they are not changed in an objective physical sense and, as such, the meal directs attention toward Christ's "bodily" resurrection and return. Actual practices of disposing of leftover elements vary widely.

The Reformed doctrine of Holy Communion (The Lord's Supper, The Eucharist) is the belief in the Real Presence (pneumatic) in the sacrament and that it is a Holy Mystery. Reformed theology has traditionally taught that Jesus' body is seated in heaven at the right hand of God; therefore his body is not physically present in the elements, nor do the elements turn into his body in a physical or any objective sense. However, Reformed theology has also historically taught that when the Holy Communion is received, not only the Spirit, but also the true body and blood of Jesus Christ are received through the Spirit, but these are only received by those partakers who eat worthily (i.e., repentantly) with faith. The Holy Spirit unites the Christian with Jesus though they are separated by a great distance. See, e.g., Westminster Confession of Faith, ch. 29; Belgic Confession, Article 35.

The Congregationalist theologian Alfred Ernest Garvie explicated the Congregationalist belief regarding the pneumatic presence in The Holy Catholic Church from the Congregational Point of View:

He is really present at the Lord's Supper without any such limitation to the element unless we are prepared to maintain that the material is more real than the spiritual. It is the whole Christ who presents Himself to faith, so that the believer has communion with Him.

In 1997, three denominations which historically held to a Reformed view of the supper—the Reformed Church in America, the United Church of Christ, and the Presbyterian Church (USA) (representative of the Continental Reformed, Congregationalist and Presbyterian traditions)—signed A Formula of Agreement with the Evangelical Lutheran Church in America, a document which stressed that: "The theological diversity within our common confession provides both the complementarity needed for a full and adequate witness to the gospel (mutual affirmation) and the corrective reminder that every theological approach is a partial and incomplete witness to the Gospel (mutual admonition) (A Common Calling, page 66)." Hence, in seeking to come to consensus about the real presence (see open communion), the churches have affirmed belief real presence of Christ in the Lord's Supper while understanding that differences exist between the Lutheran and Reformed views on this:

In the Lord's Supper the risen Christ imparts himself in body and blood, given up for all, through his word of promise with bread and wine; ... we proclaim the death of Christ through which God has reconciled the world with himself. We proclaim the presence of the risen Lord in our midst. Rejoicing that the Lord has come to us, we await his future coming in glory. ... Both of our communions, we maintain, need to grow in appreciation of our diverse eucharistic traditions, finding mutual enrichment in them. At the same time both need to grow toward a further deepening of our common experience and expression of the mystery of our Lord's Supper.

— A Formula for Agreement

Calvinistic Methodists adhere to the Reformed view of a real spiritual presence of Christ in the Eucharist.

=== Anglican ===
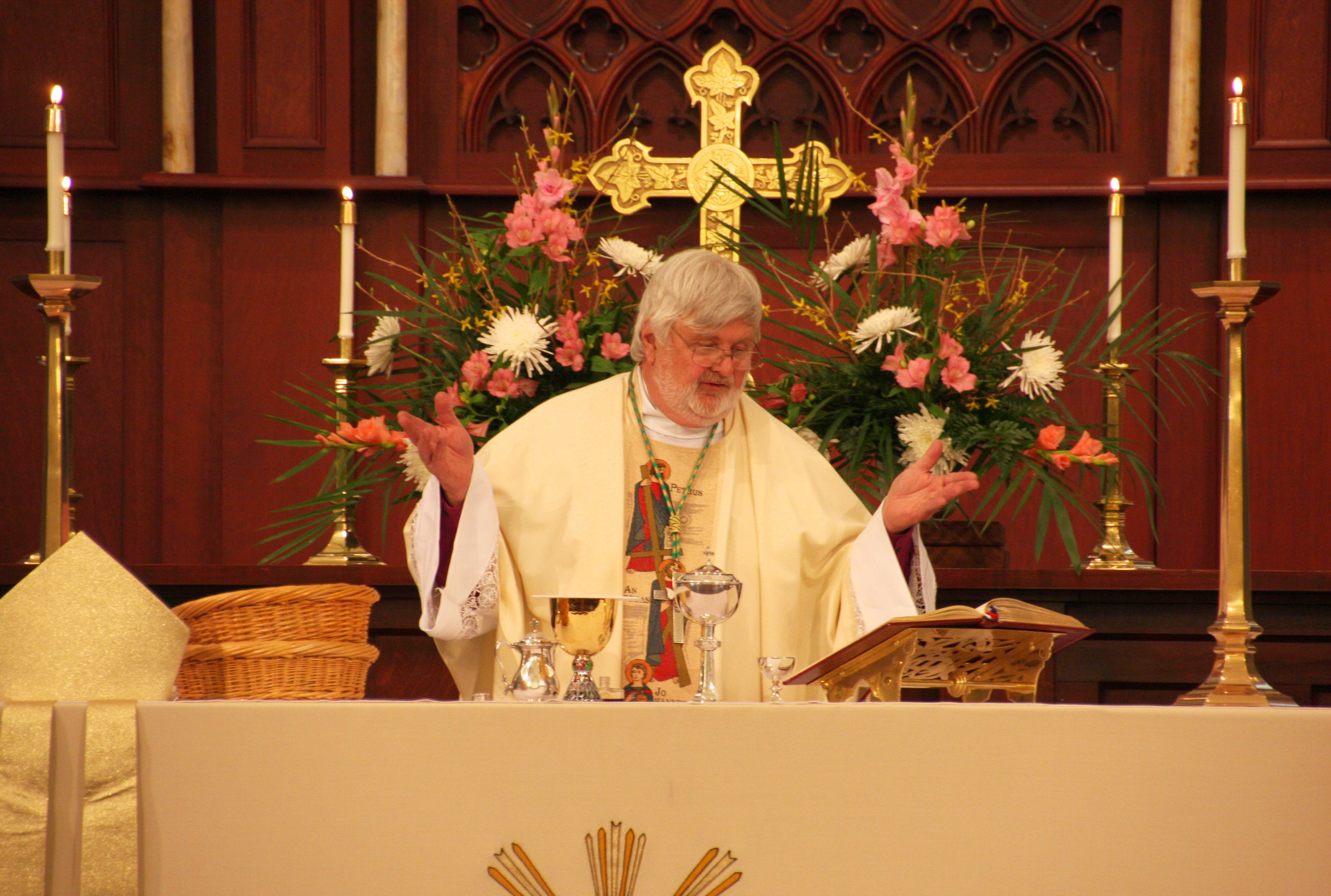
Eucharist in an Episcopal church

At the time of the Protestant Reformation in England, Anglicans inherited the Reformed view of the Eucharist as a real spiritual presence; the reformer Thomas Cranmer developed the historical Anglican formularies, including the Thirty-nine Articles of Religion, The Books of Homilies, and the Book of Common Prayer. The 28th Article of the Thirty-Nine Articles of the Church of England declare: "the Body of Christ is given, taken, and eaten, in the Supper, only after an heavently and spiritual manner." This view is the real spiritual presence (pneumatic presence) and is held by denominations of the Reformed (Continental Reformed, Presbyterian, Congregationalist, and Reformed Anglican) tradition. Anglicans prefer a view of the presence of Christ in the Eucharist in which the way it is manifested is a mystery. Likewise, Methodists postulate a par excellence spiritual presence as being a "Holy Mystery". At present, Anglicans generally and officially believe in the real presence of Christ in the Eucharist, but the specific forms of that belief range from a corporeal presence (real objective presence), sometimes even with Eucharistic adoration (mainly high church Anglo-Catholics), to belief in a pneumatic presence (mainly low church Reformed Anglicans).

In Anglican theology, a sacrament is an outward and visible sign of an inward and spiritual grace. In the Eucharist, the outward and visible sign is that of bread and wine, while the inward and spiritual grace is that of the Body and Blood of Christ. The classic Anglican aphorism with regard to the debate on the Eucharist is the poem by John Donne (1572–1631): "He was the Word that spake it; He took the bread and brake it; And what that Word did make it; I do believe and take it" (Divine Poems. On the Sacrament).

During the English Reformation the doctrine of the Church of England was strongly influenced by Continental Reformed theologians whom Cranmer had invited to England to aid with the reforms. Among these were Martin Bucer, Peter Martyr Vermigli, Bernardino Ochino, Paul Fagius, and Jan Łaski. John Calvin was also urged to come to England by Cranmer, but declined, saying that he was too involved in the Swiss reforms. Consequently, early on, the Church of England has a strong Reformed, if not particularly Calvinistic influence. The view of the real presence, as taught in the Thirty-Nine Articles therefore bears much resemblance to the doctrine of the pneumatic presence of Christ in the Eucharist, held by Bucer, Martyr and Calvin.

The Anglican Thirty-Nine Articles of Religion contends that:

Transubstantiation (or the change of the substance of bread and wine) in the Supper of the Lord, cannot be proved by Holy Writ, but is repugnant to the plain words of Scripture, overthroweth the nature of a Sacrament, and hath given occasion to many superstitions. The body of Christ is given, taken, and eaten in the Supper, only after an heavenly and spiritual manner. And the means whereby the body of Christ is received and eaten in the Supper is Faith.

— Article XXVIII

For many Anglicans, whose mysticism is intensely incarnational, it is extremely important that God has used the mundane and temporal as a means of giving people the transcendent and eternal. Some have extended this view to include the idea of a presence that is in the realm of spirit and eternity, and not to be about corporeal-fleshiness.

During the Oxford Movement of the 19th century, Tractarians advanced a belief in the real objective presence of Christ in the Eucharist, but maintained that the details of how He is present remain a mystery of faith, a view also held by the Orthodox Church and Methodist Church. Indeed, one of the oldest Anglo-Catholic devotional societies, the Confraternity of the Blessed Sacrament, was founded largely to promote belief in the real objective presence of Christ in the Eucharist.

From some Anglican perspectives, the real presence of Christ in the Holy Eucharist does not imply that Jesus Christ is present materially or locally. This is in accord with the standard Catholic view as expressed, for instance by St. Thomas Aquinas, who, while saying that the whole Christ is present in the sacrament, also said that this presence was not "as in a place". Real does not mean material: the lack of the latter does not imply the absence of the former. The Eucharist is not intrinsic to Christ as a body part is to a body, but extrinsic as his instrument to convey Divine Grace. Some Anglicans see this understanding as compatible with different theories of Christ's presence—a corporeal presence, consubstantation, or pneumatic presence—without getting involved in the mechanics of "change" or trying to explain a mystery of God's own doing.

Anglican and Catholic theologians participating in the first Anglican—Roman Catholic International Commission (ARCIC I) declared that they had "reached substantial agreement on the doctrine of the Eucharist". This claim was accepted by the 1988 Lambeth Conference of Anglican Bishops (Resolution 8), but firmly questioned in the Official Roman Catholic Response to the Final Report of ARCIC I of 1991.

=== Methodist ===
The followers of John Wesley have typically affirmed that the sacrament of Holy Communion is an instrumental Means of Grace through which the real spiritual presence of Christ is communicated to the believer, but have otherwise allowed the details to remain a mystery. The Methodist divine Richard Watson explicated Wesleyan theology on the Lord's Supper: "Christ is spiritually present to the soul of the believer in the act of receiving." Methodism inherited the Reformed view of the Lord's Supper through the Twenty-five Articles, in which Article XVIII posits a real spiritual presence of Christ in the Eucharist, noting that the "body of Christ is given, taken, and eaten in the Supper, only after an heavenly and spiritual manner." Methodists reject the Catholic doctrine of transubstantiation (see Article XVIII of the Articles of Religion); the Primitive Methodist Church in its Discipline also rejects the Lollardist doctrine of consubstantiation. In 2004, the United Methodist Church affirmed its view of the sacrament and its belief in the real presence in an official document entitled This Holy Mystery: A United Methodist Understanding of Holy Communion. Of particular note here is the church's unequivocal recognition of the anamnesis as more than just a memorial but, rather, a re-presentation of Christ Jesus and his Love.

Holy Communion is remembrance, commemoration, and memorial, but this remembrance is much more than simply intellectual recalling. "Do this in remembrance of me" (Luke 22:19; 1 Corinthians 11:24–25) is anamnesis (the biblical Greek word). This dynamic action becomes re-presentation of past gracious acts of God in the present, so powerfully as to make them truly present now. Christ is risen and is alive here and now, not just remembered for what was done in the past.

Likewise, in the Articles of Faith of the Church of the Nazarene, Article XIII declares that "The Lord's Supper is a means of grace in which Christ is present by the Spirit."

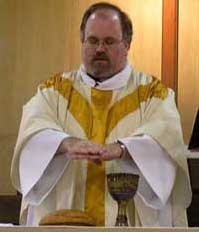
A United Methodist minister consecrates the elements.

In conformity with The Sunday Service of the Methodists, Methodism's first liturgical text, in congregations of the Allegheny Wesleyan Methodist Connection, African Methodist Episcopal Zion Church, Bethel Methodist Church, Congregational Methodist Church, Evangelical Methodist Church, Evangelical Wesleyan Church, First Bible Holiness Church, First Congregational Methodist Church, Free Methodist Church, Lumber River Conference of the Holiness Methodist Church, Metropolitan Church Association, Pilgrim Holiness Church, among many other Methodist connexions, the presider says the following when delivering the Eucharistic elements to each of the faithful (which is reflective of the Methodist teachings of the real presence of Christ in the Lord's Supper and the Lord's Supper being a sacramental means of grace):

The body of our Lord Jesus Christ, which was given for thee, preserve thy soul and body unto everlasting life. Take and eat this in remembrance that Christ died for thee, and feed on Him in thy heart, by faith with thanksgiving.

The blood of our Lord Jesus Christ, which was given for thee, preserve thy soul and body unto everlasting life. Drink this in remembrance that Christ's blood was shed for thee, and be thankful.

This affirmation of real presence is also illustrated in the language of the United Methodist Eucharistic Liturgy where, in the epiclesis of the Great Thanksgiving, the celebrating minister prays over the elements:

Pour out your Holy Spirit on us gathered here, and on these gifts of bread and wine. Make them be for us the body and blood of Christ, that we may be for the world the body of Christ, redeemed by his blood.

Methodists assert that Jesus is truly present, and that the means of his presence is a "Holy Mystery". The communion hymn Come Sinners to the Gospel Feast, by Methodist divine Charles Wesley includes the following stanza and is often sung during Methodist services of worship in which the Lord's Supper is celebrated:

Come and partake the gospel feast,
be saved from sin, in Jesus rest;
O taste the goodness of our God,
and eat his flesh and drink his blood.

The distinctive feature of the Methodist doctrine of the real presence is that the way Christ manifests his presence in the Eucharist is a sacred mystery—the focus is that Christ is truly present in the sacrament. The Discipline of the Free Methodist Church thus teaches:

The Lord's Supper is a sacrament of our redemption by Christ's death. To those who rightly, worthily, and with faith receive it, the bread which we break is a partaking of the body of Christ; and likewise the cup of blessing is a partaking of the blood of Christ. The supper is also a sign of the love and unity that Christians have among themselves. Christ, according to his promise, is really present in the sacrament.

— Discipline, Free Methodist Church

Many within the Holiness Pentecostal tradition, which is largely Wesleyan–Arminian in theology as are the Methodist Churches, also affirm this understanding of the real presence of Christ in the Eucharist.

=== Baptist ===
Historically, Baptists teach the Reformed view of the Eucharist, which posits a real spiritual presence of Christ in the Lord's Supper. Thomas Helwys, the theologian credited as one of the founders of the Baptist tradition—especially the General Baptist strand, wrote the Declaration of Faith of the English People Remaining at Amsterdam in 1611, also known as the Helwys Declaration of Faith or the 27 Articles of Faith, where it declares in the 15th article:

15. That the Lord’s Supper is the outward manifestation of the spiritual communion between Christ and the faithful mutually (1 Cor. 10:16-17) to declare His death until He come (1 Cor. 11:26).

The 17th century Nonconformist General Baptist theologian Thomas Grantham, along with other Baptist ministers, seeking agreement with the Anglican Church of England, wrote a book entitled A Friendly Epistle to the Bishops and Ministers of the Church of England, where Grantham presents agreement to most of the 39 Articles of Religion, including the 28th Article, which states:

The Supper of the Lord is not only a sign of the love that Christians ought to have among themselves one to another, but rather it is a sacrament of our redemption by Christ's death: insomuch that to such as rightly, worthily, and with faith, receive the same, the bread which we break is a partaking of the Body of Christ; and likewise the cup of blessing is a partaking of the Blood of Christ.

Transubstantiation (or the change of the substance of bread and wine) in the Supper of the Lord, cannot be proved by Holy Writ; but is repugnant to the plain words of Scripture, overthrows the nature of a sacrament, and hath given occasion to many superstitions.

The Body of Christ is given, taken, and eaten, in the Supper, only after an heavenly and spiritual manner. And the mean whereby the Body of Christ is received and eaten in the Supper, is faith.

The Sacrament of the Lord's Supper was not by Christ's ordinance reserved, carried about, lifted up, or worshipped.

Particular Baptists, also called Reformed Baptists, also hold to the Reformed view of the Lord's Supper, teaching the real spiritual presence of Christ in the Eucharist. The Particular Baptist theologian Charles Spurgeon wrote: "We firmly believe in the real presence of Christ [in the Eucharist] which is spiritual, and yet certain."

The Second London Confession of Faith, in which Particular Baptists believe, affirms the Lord's Supper to be a means of "spiritual nourishment and growth", stating:

The supper of the Lord Jesus was instituted by him the same night wherein he was betrayed, to be observed in his churches, unto the end of the world, for the perpetual remembrance, and showing to all the world the sacrifice of himself in his death, confirmation of the faith of believers in all the benefits thereof, their spiritual nourishment, and growth in him, their further engagement in, and to all duties which they owe to him; and to be a bond and pledge of their communion with him, and with each other.

In the present-day, certain Baptists adhere to the view of memorialism, including the National Baptist Convention and Southern Baptist Convention.

=== Irvingian ===
Edward Irving, who founded the Irvingian Churches, such as the New Apostolic Church, taught the real presence of Christ in the Eucharist; "Irving insisted on the real presence of the humiliated humanity of Christ in the Lord's Supper." The Catholic Apostolic Church has thus held to "the doctrine of the real presence of Christ with regard to the elements in the communion service". In the Irvingian tradition of Restorationist Christianity, consubstantiation is taught as the explanation of how the real presence is effected in the liturgy. The Catechism of the New Apostolic Church, the largest of the Irvingian denominations, teaches:

Rather, the body and blood of Christ are truly present (real presence). Through the words of consecration spoken by an Apostle or a priestly minister commissioned by him, the substance of the body and blood of Christ is joined to the substance of the bread and wine.

The outward form (accidence) of the elements of Holy Communion is not changed by this act. Just as the Man Jesus was visible during his life on earth, so also the bread and wine are visible in Holy Communion. After their consecration, however, the elements of Holy Communion constitute a dual substance–like the two natures of Jesus Christ–namely that of bread and wine and that of the body and blood of Christ. The Son of God is then truly present in the elements of Holy Communion: in his divinity and in his humanity.

However, as regards the elements of Communion it is not the case that the bread alone corresponds to the body of Christ and that the wine alone corresponds to the blood of Christ. Rather, the body and blood of Christ is completely present in each of the two elements, both the bread and the wine.

=== Anabaptist ===
A Short Confession of Faith, articulated by the early Anabaptist theologian Hans de Ries, articulated the belief in the real spiritual presence of Christ in the Lord's Supper:

28. There are ... sacraments appointed by Christ, in his holy church, the administration whereof he hath assigned to the ministry of teaching, namely, the Holy Baptism and the Holy Supper. These are outward visible handlings and tokens, setting before our eyes, on God’s side, the inward spiritual handling which God, through Christ, by the cooperation of the Holy Ghost, setteth forth the justification in the penitent faithful soul; and which, on our behalf, witnesseth our religion, experience, faith, and obedience, through the obtaining of a good conscience to the service of God.

31. The Holy Supper, according to the institution of Christ, is to be administered to the baptized; as the Lord Jesus hath commanded that whatsoever he hath appointed should be taught to be observed.

32. The whole dealing in the outward visible supper, setteth before the eye, witnesseth and signifyeth, that Christ’s body was broken upon the cross and his holy blood spilt for the remission of our sins. That the being glorified in his heavenly Being, is the alive-making bread, meat, and drink of our souls: it setteth before our eyes Christ’s office and ministry in glory and majesty, by holding his spiritual supper, which the believing soul, feeding and . . . the soul with spiritual food: it teacheth us by the outward handling to mount upwards with the heart in holy prayer, to beg at Christ’s hands the true signified food; and it admonisheth us of thankfulness to God, and of verity and love one with another.

Anabaptists teach that the "mystery of communion with the living Christ in his Supper comes into being by the power of the Spirit, dwelling in and working through the collected members of Christ’s Body". As such, in celebrations of the Eucharist, "Anabaptist congregations looked to the living Christ in their hearts and in their midst, who transformed members and elements together into a mysterious communion, creating his Body in many members, ground like grains and crushed like grapes, into one bread and one drink."

Anabaptism sees itself as emulating the practice of early Christianity, and in the present-day, a number of Anabaptist congregations have affirmed a theology of the real presence (such as the Chambersburg Christian Fellowship).

=== Zwinglian ===
Huldrych Zwingli, a Swiss Reformer, taught:

We believe that Christ is truly present in the Lord's Supper; yea, we believe that there is no communion without the presence of Christ. (Christum credimus vere esse in coena, immo non credimus esse Domini coenam nisi Christus adsit.) This is the proof: Where two or three are gathered together in my name, there am I in the midst of them. How much more is He present where the whole congregation is assembled to His honour! But that His body is literally eaten is far from the truth and the nature of faith. It is contrary to the truth, because He Himself says: I am no more in the world, and the flesh profiteth nothing, that is to eat, as the Jews then believed and the Papists still believe. It is contrary to the nature of faith, I mean the holy and true faith, because faith embraces love, fear of God, and reverence, which abhors such carnal and gross eating, as much as any one would shrink from eating his beloved son. ... We believe that the true body of Christ is eaten in the communion in a sacramental and spiritual manner by the religious, believing and pious heart, as also Chrysostom taught.

Those who adhere to the Zwinglian view, do so at Jesus's words about doing this in "remembrance" rather than any transformation or any physical presence. Rather, Christ is really present at the thanksgiving, and in the memory. Zwingli's words that the "true body of Christ is eaten in a sacramental and spiritual manner" is understood in a way where the physical objects and actions are the spiritual reminder of what Jesus had done, that He has instituted. This comes from the belief that the historical understanding of the Early Church taught that sacraments are done in "contemplation of faith" as the "proclamation of salvation and the strengthening of faith in the hearts of believers". The Plymouth Brethren, some non-denominational Churches, and those identifying with Liberal Christianity see Communion (also called the Lord's Supper) as signifying the body and blood of Jesus, a memorial of the Last Supper and the Passion with symbolic and meaningful elements, which is done by the ordinance of Jesus. This view is known as Memorialism or the Zwinglian view, as it was taught by Zwingli, a Swiss Reformer. Those who hold to the memorial understanding deny the strong sense of Transubstantiation as articulated by Lanfranc in the 11th century, arguing more akin to Berengarius who was a symbolist. Memorialists deny the sacramental union, the Lutheran doctrine of the real presence of Christ in the Eucharist. It is pointed out that while early Church Fathers used the language of real presence, this is not similar to a hard understanding of Transubstantiation. Rather, interpreting in the context of other early Church Father writings, those who emphasize the symbolic nature of the Eucharist, point out the symbolic language used by Tertullian, Cyprian, and others, noting a differentiation between the "real presence of Christ" being used to mean a bodily presence. Further it is understood that the dispute arose much later, in the 9th and 11th centuries, about the nature of the Eucharist.

== Consecration, presidency and distribution ==
Many Christian churches holding to a doctrine of the real presence of Christ in the Eucharist (for example, Catholic, Eastern Orthodox, Lutheran, Moravian, Anglican, Methodist, Oriental Orthodox, Reformed, and Irvingian) reserve to ordained clergy the function of consecrating the Eucharist, but not necessarily that of distributing the elements to communicants. Others do not speak of ordination but still reserve these functions to leaders who are given titles such as pastor, elder and deacon.

== See also ==
- Eucharistic miracle – any miracle involving the Eucharist, such as where the host and the wine have visibly changed into flesh and blood, sometimes while celebrating the Liturgy
- Eucharistic theology
- Sacramental union – official Lutheran position
- Consubstantiation – the Irvingian eucharistic theology, also held by certain Anglicans
- Trinitarian indwelling – Triune God's entering and real presence within the human heart
- Sacrament – Latter-day Saint parallel of the Eucharist
- Sacramentarians – the name given to those who during the Reformation controversies denied transubstantiation and Sacramental Union
- Stercoranism – attributed belief in real presence of Christ in physically excreted consecrated host and wine
- Transignification – theory of some twentieth-century Catholic theologians
