= Sacramental wine =

Alcoholic drink served to commemorate the Eucharist

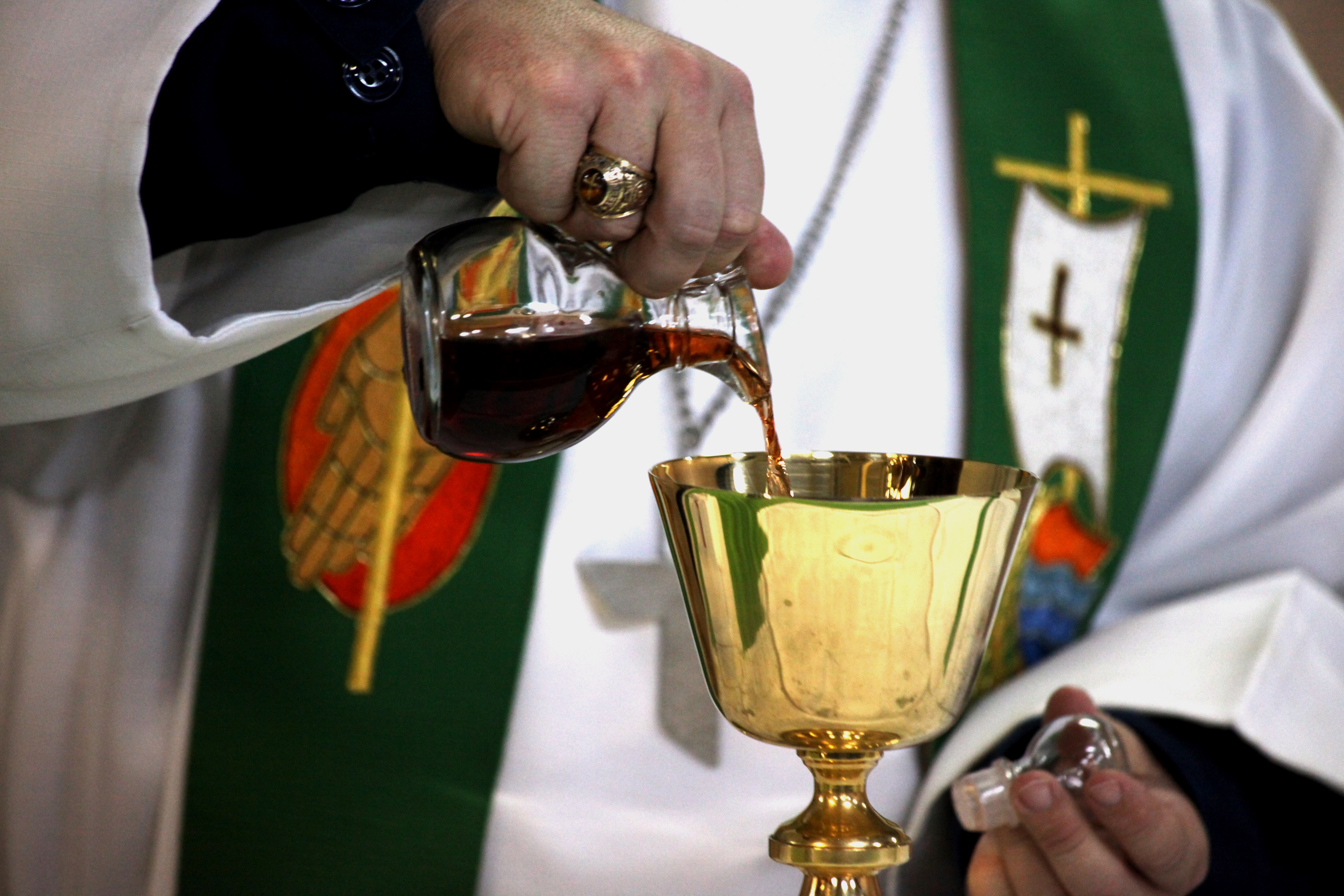
A chaplain pouring sacramental wine from a cruet into a chalice

Sacramental wine, Communion wine, altar wine, or wine for consecration is wine obtained from grapes and intended for use in celebration of the Eucharist (also referred to as the Lord's Supper or Holy Communion, among other names) and the blood of Christ. It is usually consumed after sacramental bread (the body of Christ).

== History ==
Wine was used in the earliest celebrations of the Lord's Supper. Paul the Apostle writes in 1 Corinthians 10:16:

The chalice of benediction, which we bless, is it not the communion of the blood of Christ? And the bread, which we break, is it not the partaking of the body of the Lord? For we, being many, are one bread, one body, all that partake of one bread.

In the Early Church, both clergy and laity received the consecrated wine by drinking from the chalice, after receiving a portion of the consecrated bread. Due to many factors, including the difficulty of obtaining wine in Northern European countries (where the climate was unsuitable for viticulture), drinking from the chalice became largely restricted in the West to the celebrating priest, while others received communion only in the form of bread. This also reduced the symbolic importance of choosing wine of red color. The twentieth century—especially after the Second Vatican Council—saw a return to more widespread sharing in the Eucharist under the forms of both bread and wine in the Latin Catholic Church.

In the Protestant churches, the use of wine (or grape juice in some denominations) is obligatory in the celebration of Holy Communion. However for most Protestants, a person receiving communion makes a valid communion even if they receive only in one kind (i.e., either just the bread or just the wine). For example, a sick person who can only take liquids makes a valid communion by receiving the wine.

In the Eastern Orthodox Church and the Eastern Catholic churches, the clergy continued to receive the consecrated wine by drinking directly from the chalice, but in order to avoid the danger of accidentally spilling some of the Blood of Christ the practice was developed of placing the consecrated Body of Christ in the chalice and administering Holy Communion to the faithful, under both species with a sacramental spoon.

== Composition ==
The majority of liturgical churches, such as the Catholic Church and Eastern Orthodox Church, require that sacramental wine should be pure grape wine; the use of pure grape wine is normative in the Lutheran Churches. Other Christian churches, such as some Methodist Churches, disapprove of the consumption of alcohol, and substitute grape juice for wine (see Christian views on alcohol). Duarte Barbosa wrote that local Armenian Christians in Sri Lanka (of his time) made do with the inavailability of grapes in their environment by procuring raisins from traders of Mecca or Hormuz, in which these raisins are soaked overnight for their juices to be pressed the next day before mass.

In Eastern Christianity, sacramental wine is usually red, to better symbolize its change from wine into the blood of Jesus Christ, as is believed to happen at the Eucharist. In the Eastern Orthodox Church, for example, sacramental wine used in the Divine Liturgy must usually be fermented pure sweet red grape wine. The Greek Orthodox Church favours the use of Mavrodaphne or Nama, while the Russian Orthodox Church favours Kagor. Wines with additives, such as retsina and high fructose corn syrup, are not allowed. In Western Christianity, white wine is also sometimes used for the practical purpose of avoiding stains on the altar cloths.

In most liturgical rites, such as the Roman, Byzantine, Antiochene, and Alexandrian, a small quantity of water is added to the wine when the chalice is prepared, while in the Armenian Rite the wine is consecrated without the previous mingling of water. In the Byzantine Rite some hot water, referred to as the zeon (Greek: "boiling"), is added to the consecrated wine shortly before the Communion. Originally common practice in the ancient Mediterranean, this ritual has been accorded multiple symbolic meanings, such as the mystery of Christ's human and divine natures, his unity with the Church, and the flow of blood and water from Christ's side at his death.

=== Practice by Christian denomination ===
==== Roman Catholicism ====
Over the centuries, various criteria were laid down for wine to be appropriate for use in the Eucharist. Editions of the Tridentine Roman Missal had a section De Defectibus on defects which could occur in the celebration of Mass, including defects of the wine. Canon 924 of the present Code of Canon Law (1983) states:

§1 The most holy Sacrifice of the Eucharist must be celebrated in bread, and in wine to which a small quantity of water is to be added.

§2 The bread must be wheaten only, and recently made, so that there is no danger of corruption.

§3 The wine must be natural, made from grapes of the vine, and not corrupt.

This means that the wine must be naturally fermented with nothing added to it, and the wine itself cannot have soured or become vinegar, nor can it have anything artificial added to it (preservatives, flavours). While the Catholic Church generally adheres to the rule that all wine for sacramental use must be pure grape wine and alcoholic it is accepted that there are some circumstances, where it may be necessary to use a wine that is only minimally fermented, called mustum.

One exception was historically made regarding wine-derived additives to wine. An 1896 directive of the Congregation of the Inquisition stated:

To conserve weak and feeble wines, and in order to keep them from souring or spoiling during transportation, a small quantity of spirits of wine (grape brandy or alcohol) may be added, provided the following conditions are observed:

1. The added spirit (alcohol) must have been distilled from the grape (ex genimime vitis);
2. the quantity of alcohol added, together with that which the wine contained naturally after fermentation, must not exceed eighteen per cent of the whole;
3. the addition must be made during the process of fermentation.

==== Lutheranism ====
The Lutheran Churches use sacramental wine in the Eucharist, and this may be mingled with water in the chalice during the Mass:

... there is scriptural support for the practice of mixing wine with water in that both water and blood flow from Christ’s side, and also in Proverbs, in which Wisdom (which is Christ) calls us to eat of His bread and drink of the wine He has mixed. In following the teaching of scripture and the historic church, proper practice for communion should be to use wine mixed with water.

==== Methodism ====
Methodist denominations use non-alcoholic wine (i.e. grape juice) in the sacrament,and in general, Methodists have historically supported teetotalism. The 1916 rubric in the Discipline of the Methodist Episcopal Church, which has influenced descendant Methodist connexions, states: "Let the pure, unfermented juice of the grape be used in administering the Lord's Supper."

== Manner of consumption ==
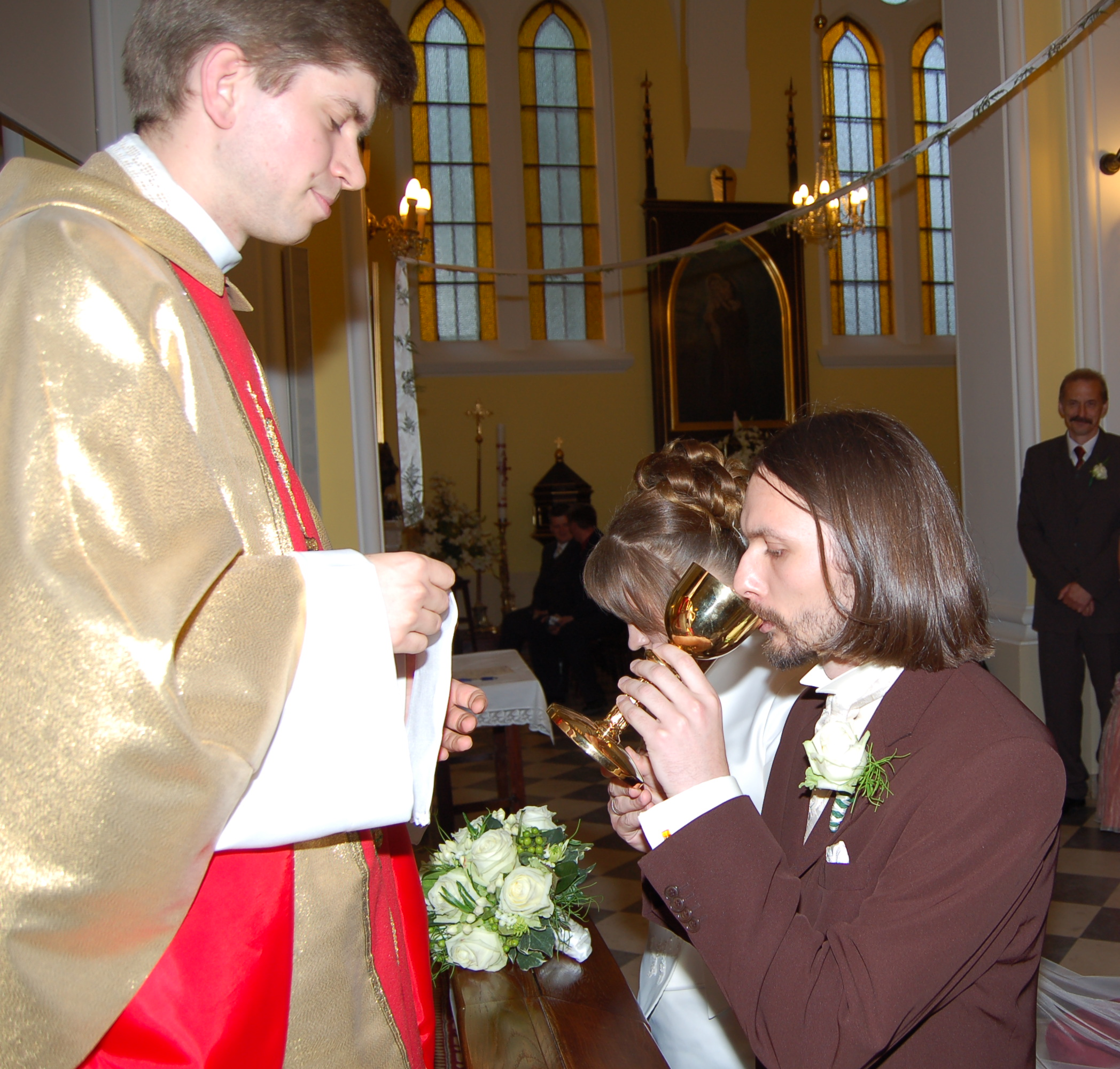
A bridegroom receiving the chalice at the altar rail during a Nuptial Mass

In the Roman Rite of the Catholic Church, Communion is administered under the form of wine either by the communicant drinking directly from the chalice or by intinction. In the latter manner, the priest partially dips the consecrated bread into the consecrated wine and then places it in the mouth of the communicant.

Editions of the Roman Missal issued between 1970 and 2000 envisaged also use of a silver tube (Latin: fistula) with which, as with a "straw", to drink from the chalice, or of a spoon as in the Byzantine Rite.

In the Byzantine Rite of the Eastern Orthodox Church and some Eastern Catholic Churches and Eastern Lutheran Churches the normal method is to use a spoon to give the communicant some of the consecrated wine together with a portion of the consecrated bread that has been placed in the chalice.

In the Lutheran Churches and the Anglican Church, the wine is normally consumed with each communicant receiving a small sip of it as the chalice is offered to him/her. This is often referred to as "the common cup".

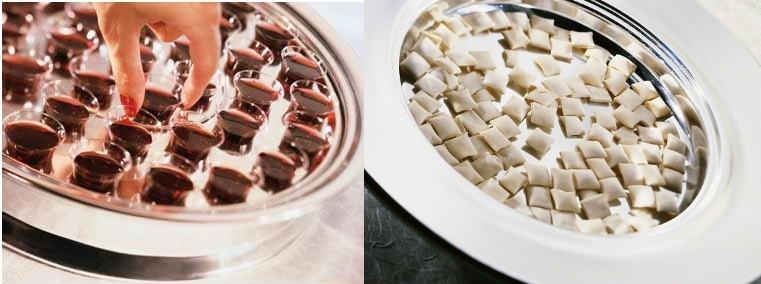
The serving of Communion elements individually, to be taken in unison, is common among Baptists.

Other Protestant denominations use small individual cups, presented to communicants on a tray, although a larger chalice may still be used by the presiding minister.

== Industry ==
Throughout the world there are some wineries that exist either solely for the production of sacramental wines, or with sacramental wines as an auxiliary business. The same is true of wine used by other religions, e.g., kosher wine. These wineries are small and often run by religious brothers, priests or dedicated laity.

In Australia, for example, Australian Jesuits founded the oldest existing winery in the Clare Valley in 1851 to make sacramental wines. Producing over 90,000 litres (20,000 imp gal; 24,000 US gal) of wine annually, this winery supplies all of the Australian region's sacramental wine needs. The oldest vineyard founded for sacramental wine, still producing in the United States, is O-Neh-Da Vineyard in the Finger Lakes wine region of New York State, founded in 1872 by Bernard John McQuaid, the bishop of Rochester.

== See also ==
- Alcohol in the Bible
- Blood of Christ
- Chalice
- Christian views on alcohol
- Communion cup
- Religion and alcohol
- Vin santo
- Hamra (Mandaeism)
