= Communion cup =

Liturgical vessel

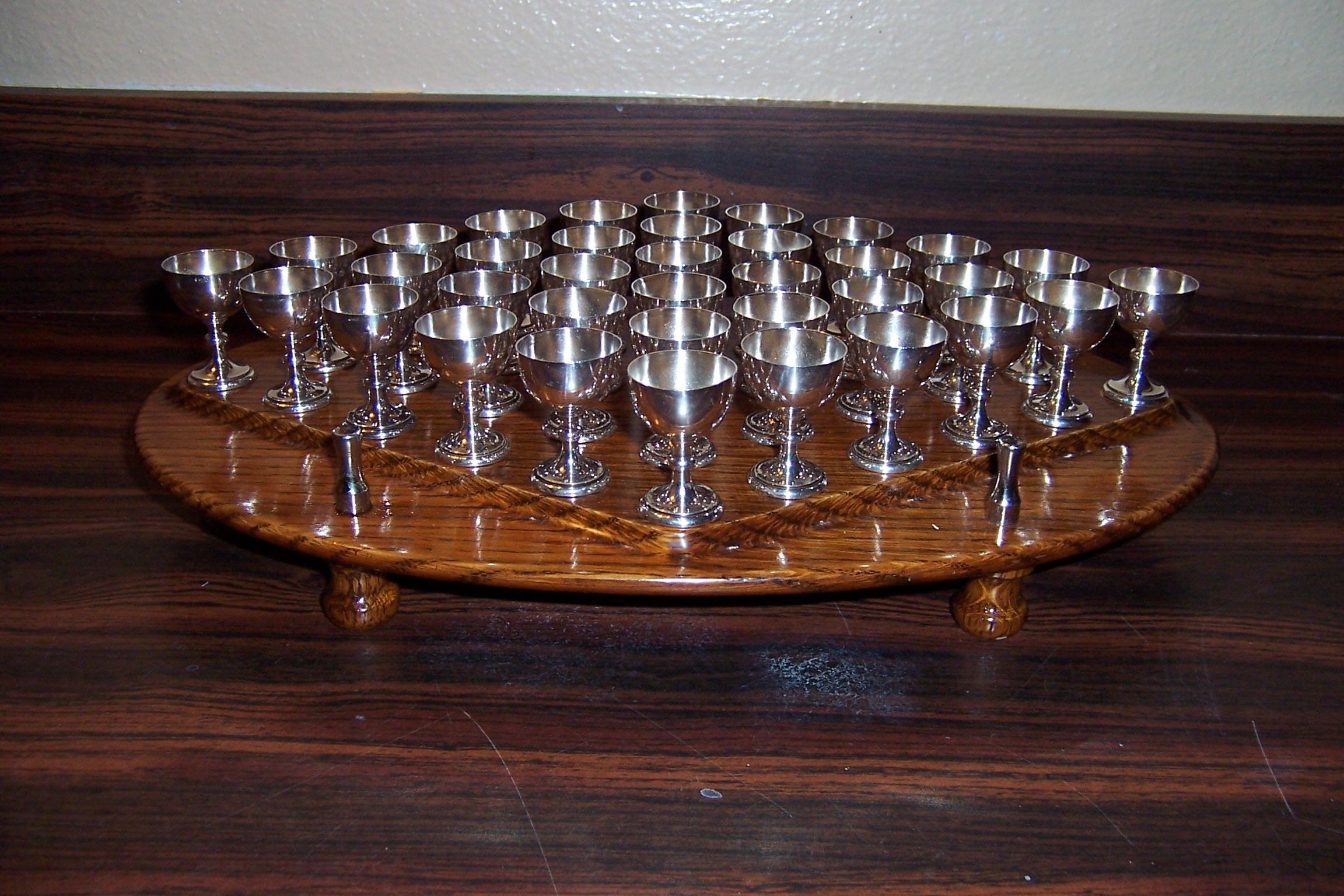
A tray of communion cups dating from c. 1950

A communion cup is a ritual vessel, a variant of a chalice, used by only one member of the congregation. A communion cup is usually quite small; it can be as small as a shot glass. They may be designed as small beakers or as miniature versions of the usual liturgical chalice. This manner of administering consecrated wine at Holy Communion has become established in various Christian denominations, either as a general practice or as a temporary arrangement; for example, during epidemics.

In churches such as the Catholic Church, which generally offers communion without wine, or where intinction (dipping the host in the chalice) is the custom, communion cups are not known.

== Scandinavia ==
In Scandinavia, the consecrated wine can be shared in the Church of Norway from a single chalice (from which everyone drinks in turn), from communion cups (særkalker), or through intinction. The use of communion cups in Norway is recent; it was introduced as part of the fight against tuberculosis in the late 1890s. The Norwegian Women's Sanitation Association (Norske Kvinners Sanitetsforening) was a key driver behind the innovation; it also helped to acquire communion cups for several churches. The practice was not introduced without controversy: it triggered a fierce debate over whether it was truly communion if not everyone drank from the same chalice.

The communion cup was introduced later in the Church of Denmark. It was first approved in 1909, but it was only came into general use at the end of the First World War, when both tuberculosis and the Spanish flu were rampant.

== North America ==
Communion cups were also introduced in North American churches in the 1890s. As in Scandinavia, the new practice was motivated by sanitary concerns and accompanied by debate over whether it was ritually acceptable. Newspaper headlines of the time warned of danger and contagion associated with the shared chalice.

== United Kingdom ==
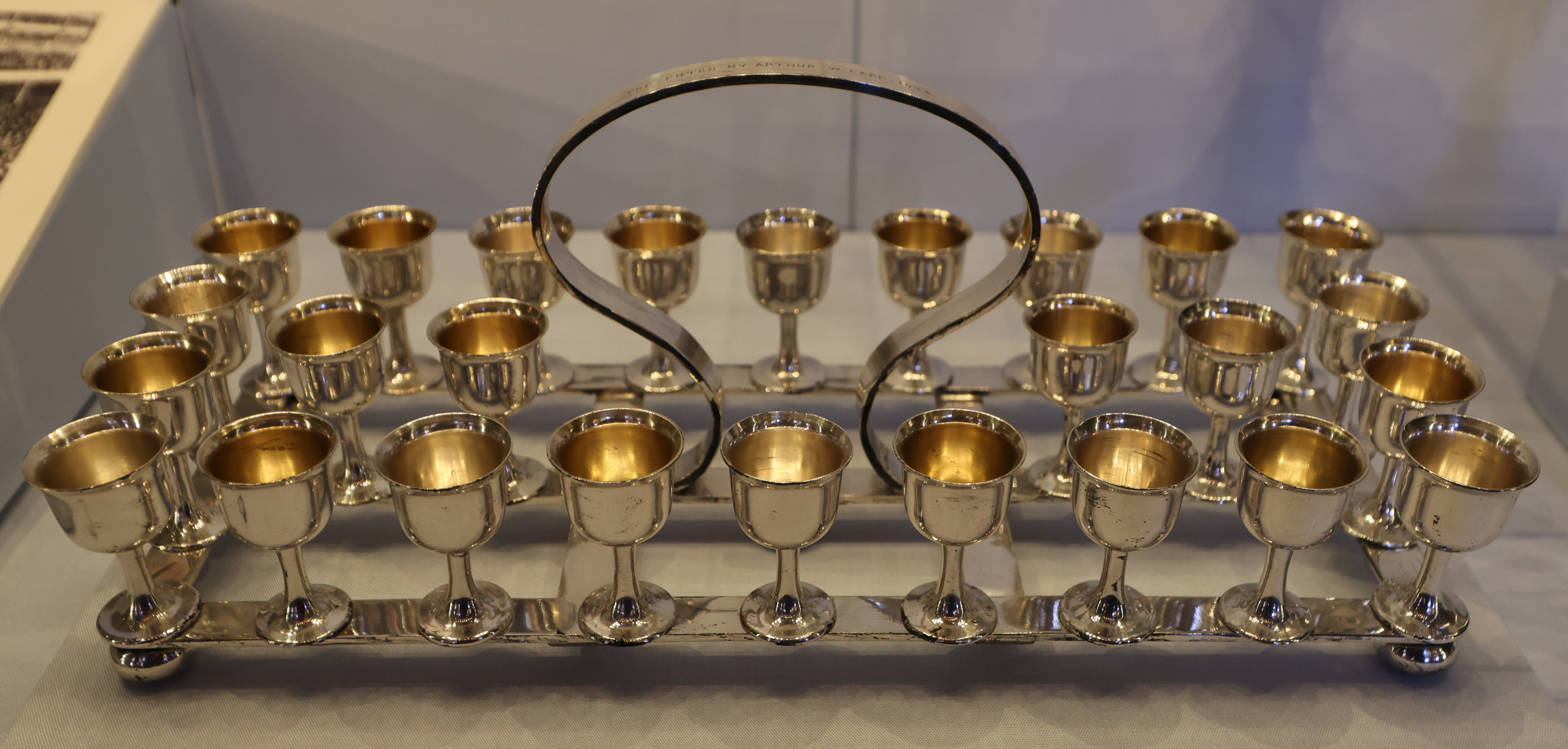
A set of British Communion cups dating from around 1926

In the UK they appear to have been invented by John Henry Jowett around the turn of the 20th century in response to health concerns related to the size of his congregation.
