= Intinction =

Eucharistic practice

Intinction is the Eucharistic practice of partly dipping the consecrated bread, or host, into the consecrated wine before consumption by the communicant.

== Western Christianity ==
Intinction is a method of administering Holy Communion in many Western Christian denominations. Its etymology is from the Latin word intinctiō, meaning a dipping in.

It is one of the four ways approved in the Latin liturgical rites of the Catholic Church for administering Holy Communion under the form of wine as well as of bread: "The norms of the Roman Missal admit the principle that in cases where Communion is administered under both kinds, 'the Blood of the Lord may be received either by drinking from the chalice directly, or by intinction, or by means of a tube or a spoon' (General Instruction of the Roman Missal, 245). [...]" In the Catholic Church, "The communicant must not be permitted to intinct the host himself in the chalice, nor to receive the intincted host in the hand. As for the host to be used for the intinction, it should be made of valid matter, also consecrated; it is altogether forbidden to use non-consecrated bread or other matter."

Intinction occurs in some Old Catholic Churches and Lutheran Churches, and intinction is common in some Anglican/Episcopal Churches, which often give the communicant the choice of drinking from the chalice or receiving by intinction. In many Lutheran, some Episcopal, Congregational, Presbyterian, Methodist, and Baptist churches, intinction is done in the manner of the communicant, not the pastor, dipping the host in the chalice.

== Eastern Christianity ==
In the Eastern Orthodox Church, leavened bread is employed for the Eucharist. Traditionally, the consecrated bread is placed in the chalice and is given together with the consecrated wine directly into the communicant's mouth with a small spoon. Some of the Byzantine-rite Eastern Catholic Churches in communion with the Church of Rome adopted intinction during the early 20th century, dividing the bread into pieces long enough to be partially dipped in the consecrated wine and placed on the communicant's tongue. This is the practice at least of the Melkite Greek Catholic Church and the Greek Byzantine Catholic Church.

Some Eastern Catholic Churches (for instance, the Ethiopic Rite Catholics of Ethiopia and Eritrea) have adopted the use of unleavened bread, justifying it by reference to the ancient Jewish practice of using only unleavened bread at Passover meals, and give Communion by intinction.

=== The Liturgy of the Presanctified Gifts ===
Eastern Orthodox practice with regard to the Liturgy of the Presanctified Gifts has varied historically and geographically. At this Liturgy, which is customarily used only on weekdays of Great Lent, no prayers of consecration take place but communion is distributed with bread with wine poured into it that were consecrated and reserved at the Divine Liturgy the Sunday before. Wine is placed in the chalice at the Presanctified Liturgy, and the presanctified Eucharist is placed into the wine. In the Greek and ancient Russian practice, this is understood as a "second consecration" in which the wine then becomes consecrated by contact with the consecrated bread that has had the consecrated wine poured into it on the previous Sunday

In modern Russian practice, however, it is not considered consecrated. It is said to remain ordinary wine and is used only to facilitate swallowing the bread and so that the people can receive Communion in their customary way. This view is a subject of some controversy.

The already consecrated bread used in this Liturgy has been united, at the time it is reserved, with the consecrated wine by placing some of the consecrated wine on the bread with the spoon. In the Russian tradition the wine is placed so that it traces out a cross. Also in the Russian tradition, whichever of the ministers is to consume the remaining elements at the end of the Presanctified Liturgy partakes of the bread alone when he receives Communion at that service and does not drink from the chalice so that he does not break his pre-Communion fast.

The Greek (and ancient Russian) tradition is that the wine in the cup is sanctified, once a portion of the bread, on which consecrated wine has previously been poured, is placed in it at the "union" after the Fraction. All celebrants therefore receive the cup as well as the bread.

Even when it happens that, at the time of reservation, a priest partially dips the unbroken consecrated bread into the consecrated wine instead of pouring some of the wine on it with the spoon, this does not constitute intinction in the sense here understood of performing the action at the time of administering Communion.

== See also ==
- Eucharist
- Eucharistic discipline
- Eucharistic theology
- Eucharistic theologies contrasted
- Liturgical reforms of Pope Pius XII
- Redemptionis Sacramentum
- Sacrament
- Sacramental wine
