= Eucharistic theology =

Branch of Christian theology

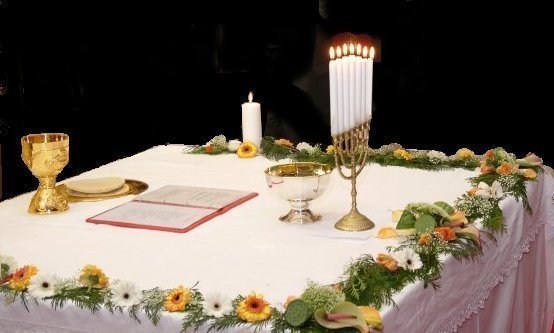
Preparation shown for the celebration of the Eucharist

Eucharistic theology is a branch of Christian theology which treats doctrines concerning the Holy Eucharist, also commonly known as the Lord's Supper and Holy Communion. The majority of Christian denominations view the Eucharist as a sacrament or ordinance.

In the Gospel accounts of Jesus' earthly ministry, a crowd of listeners challenges him regarding the rain of manna before he delivers the famous Bread of Life Discourse (John 6:22–59), and he describes himself as the "True Bread from Heaven". The aforementioned Bread of Life Discourse occurs in the Gospel of John, John 6:30–59. Therein, Jesus promises to give his flesh and blood, which he states will give eternal life to all who receive it. In John 6:53 (RSV), Jesus says, "Truly, truly, I say to you, unless you eat the flesh of the Son of man and drink his blood, you have no life in you"; in verses 54–55, he continues: "he who eats my flesh and drinks my blood has eternal life, and I will raise him up at the last day. For my flesh is food indeed and my blood is drink indeed."

Every year, Jews in Israel celebrated the Passover Meal, remembering and celebrating their liberation from captivity in Egypt. In the Gospel of John, Jesus is recorded as celebrating the Last Supper with his Apostles at Passover.

Saint Paul, in his First Letter to the Corinthians (1 Corinthians 11:23–26), as well as the Synoptic Gospels of Matthew (Matthew 26:26–28), Mark (Mark 14:22–24), and Luke (Luke 22:19–20), state that Jesus, in the course of the Last Supper on the night before his death, instituted the Eucharist, stating: "This is my body", and "This is my blood". For instance, Matthew recounts: "And as they were eating, Jesus took bread, and blessed it, and brake it, and gave it to the disciples, and said, Take, eat; this is my body; And he took the cup, and gave thanks, and gave it to them, saying, Drink ye all of it; For this is my blood of the new testament, which is shed for many for the remission of sins."

The Gospel of John, on the other hand, makes no mention of this. One explanation offered is that the author of the Gospel of John intended the Gospel to supplement what other evangelists had already written.

== Overview ==
Because Jesus is a person of the Holy Trinity, theology regarding the Eucharist involves consideration of the way in which the communicant's personal relationship with God is contributed to by consumption of the Eucharist. However, debates over Eucharistic theology in the West have centered on the metaphysical aspects of Jesus' presence in this ritual.

=== Real presence ===
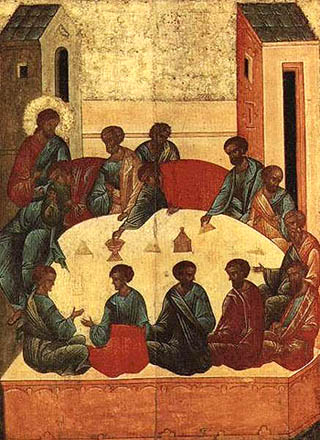
Russian icon of the Last Supper (1497)

Many Christian denominations have the teaching of Christ being truly present in the Eucharist, such as Catholicism, Eastern Orthodoxy, Oriental Orthodoxy, the Church of the East, Lutheranism, Moravianism, Anglicanism, Methodism, the Continental Reformed tradition, Presbyterianism, Congregationalism, the Baptist tradition, and the Irvingian Church. The differences in the teachings of these churches primarily concern "the mode of Christ's presence in the Lord's Supper".

==== Definitive change ====
Eastern Orthodox Christians generally do not hold to the specifics of the defined doctrine of transubstantiation, though there is agreement with the definition's conclusion about the real presence of Christ in the Eucharist. Eastern Orthodox Christians use the term "change" (Ancient Greek: μεταβολή), as in the epiclesis of the Divine Liturgy, to describe the change of the bread and wine into the actual body and blood of Jesus. (See "Objective reality, silence about technicalities", below.) The terminology of transubstantiation was adopted within the Eastern Orthodox Church by the Synod of Jerusalem (1672), although it is not recognized as having the authority of an Ecumenical Council and has been criticized by some theologians within the Eastern church for a perceived tendency toward Latinization.

==== Transubstantiation ====
In the substance theory of the Eucharist, the substances of the bread and wine become the substances in the body, blood, soul and divinity of Jesus; however, it is also believed that the accidents (physical traits, including chemical properties) of the bread and wine remain. This view is taught by the Roman Catholic Church, including in its Eastern Rites.

==== Sacramental union ====
The sacramental union is the doctrine of the real presence of Christ in the Eucharist held by the Lutheran churches. In the sacramental union view, in the "use" of the sacrament, according to the words of Jesus and by the power of his speaking of them, the consecrated bread is united with his body and the consecrated wine with his blood for all communicants, whether believing or unbelieving, to eat and drink. This is the position of the Lutheran Church, echoing the view of "objective reality, but pious silence about technicalities", with its "pious silence about technicalities" in that it objects to philosophical terms like "transubstantiation" (the Roman doctrine) and "consubstantiation" (the Irvingian doctrine).

==== Consubstantiation ====
Consubstantiation is the belief that "The bread retains its substance and ... Christ's glorified body comes down into the bread through the consecration and is found there together with the natural substance of the bread, without quantity but whole and complete in every part of the sacramental bread." Consubstantiation was the position of the Lollards, as well as the Irvingian churches, such as the New Apostolic Church. Some High Church Anglicans identify with this position. It is erroneously used to denote the Lutheran position, who instead affirm the doctrine of sacramental union as their teaching of the corporeal presence of Christ in the Eucharist.

==== Objective reality, silence about technicalities ====
"Objective reality, but pious silence about technicalities" (or "divine [or holy] mystery") is the view of all the ancient churches of the East. While they agree that in the sacrament the bread and the wine are really and truly changed into the body and the blood of Jesus, and while they have at times employed the terminology of "substance" to explain what is changed, (Note: "after the consecration of the bread and of the wine, there no longer remaineth the substance of the bread and of the wine, but the Body Itself and the Blood of the Lord, under the species and form of bread and wine; that is to say, under the accidents of the bread". (Synod of Jerusalem); "the word transubstantiation is not to be taken to define the manner in which the bread and wine are changed into the Body and Blood of the Lord; for this none can understand but God; but only thus much is signified, that the bread truly, really, and substantially becomes the very true Body of the Lord, and the wine the very Blood of the Lord". The Catechism of the Eastern Orthodox Church also uses the term transubstantiation) they usually avoid this language, considering it redolent of scholasticism, as presenting speculative metaphysics as doctrine, and as scrutinizing excessively the manner in which the transformation takes place.

==== Pneumatic presence ====
The pneumatic presence, also called Real Spiritual Presence, spiritual presence, or mystical presence, is the belief that not only the spirit of Christ but also his true body and blood of Jesus (hence "real"), are received by the sovereign, mysterious, and miraculous power of the Holy Spirit (hence "spiritual") only by those partakers who have faith. This view approaches the "pious silence" view in its unwillingness to specify how the Holy Spirit makes Jesus present, but positively excludes not just symbolism but also trans- and con-substantiation. This understanding is often called "receptionism". This view is held by the Reformed traditions, including the Continental Reformed, Presbyterian, Congregationalist, Baptist and Anglican traditions. 3-2+9Thomas Cranmer, the guiding Protestant Reformer of the Church of England, reflected this real spiritual presence in the Thirty-nine Articles, which hold that "the Body of the Christ is given, taken, and eaten, in the Supper, only after an heavently and spiritual manner". This view can be seen as being suggested in the invocation of the Anglican Rite as found in the American Book of Common Prayer, 1928 and earlier and in Rite I of the American BCP of 1979 as well as in other Anglican formularies:

And we most humbly beseech thee, O merciful Father, to hear us, and of thy almighty goodness, vouchsafe to bless and sanctify, with thy Word and Holy Spirit, these thy gifts and creatures of bread and wine; that we, receiving them according to thy Son our Savior Jesus Christ's holy institution, in remembrance of his death and passion, may be partakers of his most blessed body and blood.

Rite I is unchanged from the BCP of 1552 (Second Prayer-Book of Edward VI) save for modern syntax and spelling:

Heare us O mercyefull father wee beeseche thee; and graunt that wee, receyuing these thy creatures of bread and wyne, accordinge to thy sonne our Sauioure Jesus Christ's holy institucion, in remembraunce of his death and passion, maye be partakers of his most blessed body and bloud:

The Rite also differs in its inclusion of some additional words from the BCP of 1549 (First Prayer-Book of Edward VI):

and with thy holy spirite and worde, vouchsafe to blesse and sanctifie these thy gyftes

The Reformed theology of receptionism, or the real spiritual presence, is the view inherited by and held by Methodists "and is well presented in the Holy Communion hymns of Charles Wesley."

==== Presence manifested in the assembly of the faithful ====
During the celebration of the Lord's Supper, Anabaptists emphasize the "mystery of communion with the living Christ in his Supper [that] comes into being by the power of the Spirit, dwelling in and working through the collected members of Christ's Body".

==== Memorialism ====
The view known as memorialism is that bread and wine are symbolic of the body and blood of Jesus, and in partaking of the elements the believer commemorates the sacrificial atonement of Jesus for all; Jesus presence in the sacrament is in the faithful minds and hearts of the communicants not in any physical sense. This view, also known as "Zwinglianism" after Huldrych Zwingli, is held by the Plymouth Brethren, Unitarians, and Jehovah's Witnesses. The Racovian Catechism of Unitarian Christianity teaches that "this rite is to be observed for the purpose of commemorating or showing forth the kindness manifested by Christ towards us".

=== Suspension ===
Suspension is the view that Jesus did not intend partaking of the bread and wine to be a perpetual ordinance, or that he did not intend it to be taken as a religious rite or ceremony (also known as adeipnonism, meaning "no supper" or "no meal"). This is the view of Quakers and the Salvation Army, as well as the hyperdispensationalist positions of E. W. Bullinger, and others. Some full preterists, holding that Jesus returned in AD 70, believe on the basis of 1 Corinthians 11:26 that it is no longer required to partake of the Lord's Supper.

=== Eucharistic sacrifice ===
Catholics, Lutherans, Oriental Orthodox, and Eastern Orthodox Christians all affirm that the Eucharist is a sacrifice.

Both Lutheran and Orthodox Christians teach: "that the Eucharist is a sacrifice in the sense that 1) it is Christ, not the celebrant priest, who offers and is offered as the sacrifice, 2) Christ’s sacrifice of atonement is made once and for all with respect to God, and 3) it is sacramentally enacted so that its benefits are distributed to the believers each and every time the Eucharist is celebrated. Both Orthodox and Lutherans also regard the Eucharist as a sacrifice of thanksgiving and praise (Heb. 13,15)."

A formal statement by the USCCB affirms that "Methodists and Catholics agree that the sacrificial language of the Eucharistic celebration refers to 'the sacrifice of Christ once-for-all,' to 'our pleading of that sacrifice here and now,' to 'our offering of the sacrifice of praise and thanksgiving,' and to 'our sacrifice of ourselves in union with Christ who offered himself to the Father.'"

The Irvingian churches, teach the "real presence of the sacrifice of Jesus Christ in Holy Communion":

In Holy Communion, it is not only the body and blood of Christ, but also His sacrifice itself, that are truly present. However, this sacrifice has only been brought once and is not repeated in Holy Communion. Neither is Holy Communion merely a reminder of the sacrifice. Rather, during the celebration of Holy Communion, Jesus Christ is in the midst of the congregation as the crucified, risen, and returning Lord. Thus His once-brought sacrifice is also present in that its effect grants the individual access to salvation. In this way, the celebration of Holy Communion causes the partakers to repeatedly envision the sacrificial death of the Lord, which enables them to proclaim it with conviction (1 Corinthians 11: 26). —¶8.2.13, The Catechism of the New Apostolic Church

== Efficacy of the rite ==
Eastern and Western liturgical traditions generally agree with St. Augustine of Hippo in teaching that the efficacy of the sacraments as a means of divine grace does not depend on the worthiness of the priest or minister administering them. Augustine developed this concept in his controversy with the Donatists. In traditional Christianity, the efficacy and validity of the sacrament does, however, depend on properly ordained bishops and priests with a lineage from the Apostles, a doctrine called "apostolic succession". Apostolic succession is taught by the Eastern Orthodox, Oriental Orthodoxy, Roman Catholic, Lutheran, Anglican, and Moravian/Hussite churches.

== Theologies of different churches ==
=== Catholic Church ===
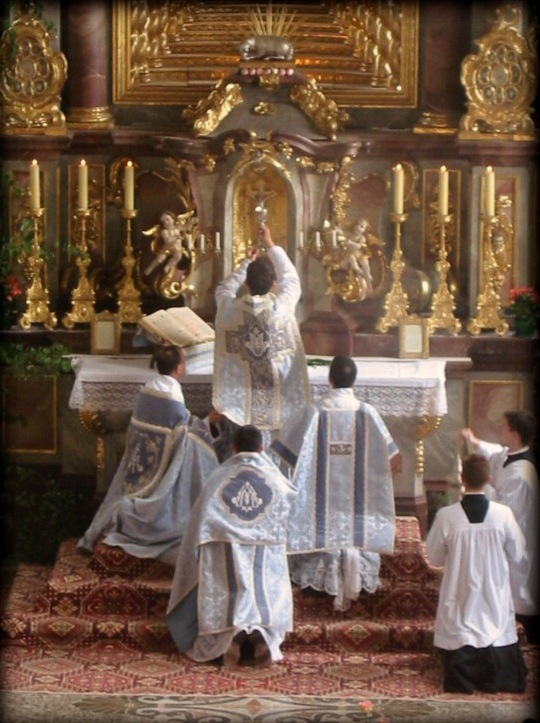
Elevation of the Eucharist at a Tridentine Catholic Mass

In the Catholic Church, the Communion bread is fervently revered in view of the Church's doctrine that, when bread and wine are consecrated during the Eucharistic celebration, they cease to be bread and wine and become the body and blood of Jesus. The empirical appearances continue to exist unchanged, but the reality believed to be changed by the power of the Holy Spirit, who has been called down upon the bread and wine. The separate consecrations of the bread (known as the host) and of the wine symbolizes the separation of Jesus' body from his blood at Calvary. However, since Catholicism also teaches that Jesus rose from the dead and was ascended in body and spirit into Heaven, the Church teaches that the body and blood of Jesus are no longer actually separated, as where one is, the other must be. Therefore, although the priest (or other minister) says "The Body of Christ" when administering the host and "The Blood of Christ" when presenting the chalice, the communicant who receives either one receives Jesus, whole and entire, body and blood, soul and divinity. This belief is succinctly summarised in St. Thomas Aquinas' hymn, Adoro Te Devote.

The mysterious (Note: The Roman Catholic Church holds that no explanation is possible about how the change from bread and wine to the body and blood of Christ is brought about, and limits itself to teaching what is changed: "The signs of bread and wine become, in a way surpassing understanding, the Body and Blood of Christ".) change of the reality of the bread and wine began to be called "transubstantiation" in the 11th century. The earliest known text in which the term appears is a sermon of 1079 by Gilbert of Savardin, Archbishop of Tours, (Patrologia Latina CLXXI 776). The first appearance of the term in a papal document was in the letter of Pope Innocent III Cum Marthae circa to John of Canterbury on 29 November 1202, then briefly in the decree Firmiter credimus of the Fourth Lateran Council (1215) and afterward in the book "Iamdudum" sent to the Armenians in the year 1341. An explanation utilizing Aristotle's hylomorphic theory of reality did not appear until the 13th century, with Alexander of Hales (died 1245).

The actual moment of change is believed to be the priest's liturgical recitation of the Words of Institution: "This is my Body ..." and "This is the Chalice of my Blood ...".

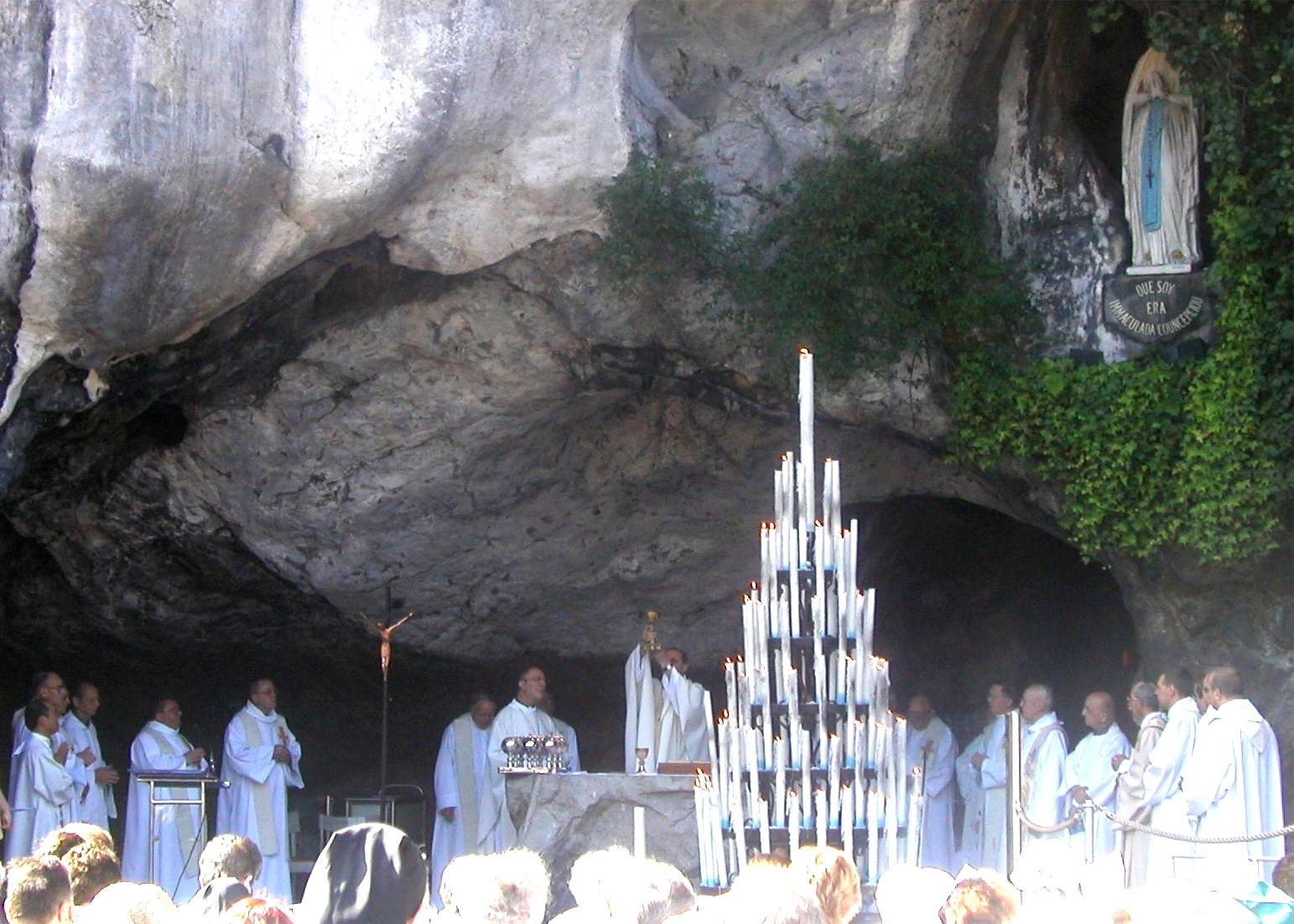
At a celebration of the Eucharist at Lourdes, the chalice is shown to the people immediately after the consecration of the wine.

The Eucharist is a sacrifice in that it literally re-presents (in the sense of "makes present again") the same sacrifice offered by Jesus on the cross, wherein the sacrifice of Jesus and the sacrifice of the Eucharist are considered one single sacrifice; the Eucharist is not considered to sacrifice Jesus a second time. The Mass is a liturgical representation of a sacrifice that makes present what it represents through the action of God in an unbloody manner. The Eucharist is not merely a commemoration of Jesus' sacrifice on Golgotha: it also makes that sacrifice truly present. The priest and victim of the sacrifice are one and the same (Jesus), with the difference that the Eucharist is offered in an unbloody manner.

The only ministers who can officiate at the Eucharist and consecrate the sacrament are ordained priests (either bishops or priestly presbyters) acting in the person of Christ ("in persona Christi"). In other words, the priest celebrant represents Jesus himself, who is the Head of the Church, and acts before God the Father in the name of the Catholic Church, always using "we" not "I" during the Eucharistic prayer. The matter used must be wheaten bread and grape wine; this is considered essential for validity.

Catholics may receive Holy Communion outside of Mass, normally only as the host. Consecrated hosts are kept in a tabernacle after the celebration of Mass and brought to the sick or dying during the week. A large consecrated host is sometimes displayed in a monstrance outside of Mass, to be the focus of prayer and Eucharistic adoration.

The Eucharistic celebration is seen as the foundation and the very centre of all Catholic devotion. One of the seven Sacraments, it is referred to as the Blessed Sacrament, and is taught to bestow grace upon the recipient, assisting with repentance and with the avoidance of venial sin. The "self-offering of the believer in union with Christ", and the transformation of the believer into conforming with the Holy Spirit implicit in the symbolism, is understood as integral to the disposition needed for the fruitful reception of Communion. Reception of Communion and of the sacrament of Confession is a condition for receiving indulgences granted for some acts of piety.

For fear of desecration, the Eucharist may not be received by any in a state of mortal sin, nor by non-Catholics; Catholics aware of being in a state of mortal sin must repent and make confession to a priest before they can receive the Holy Eucharist. For a Catholic to receive the Eucharist in a state of mortal sin is considered to be a grave sacrilege.

=== Eastern Orthodox Church ===
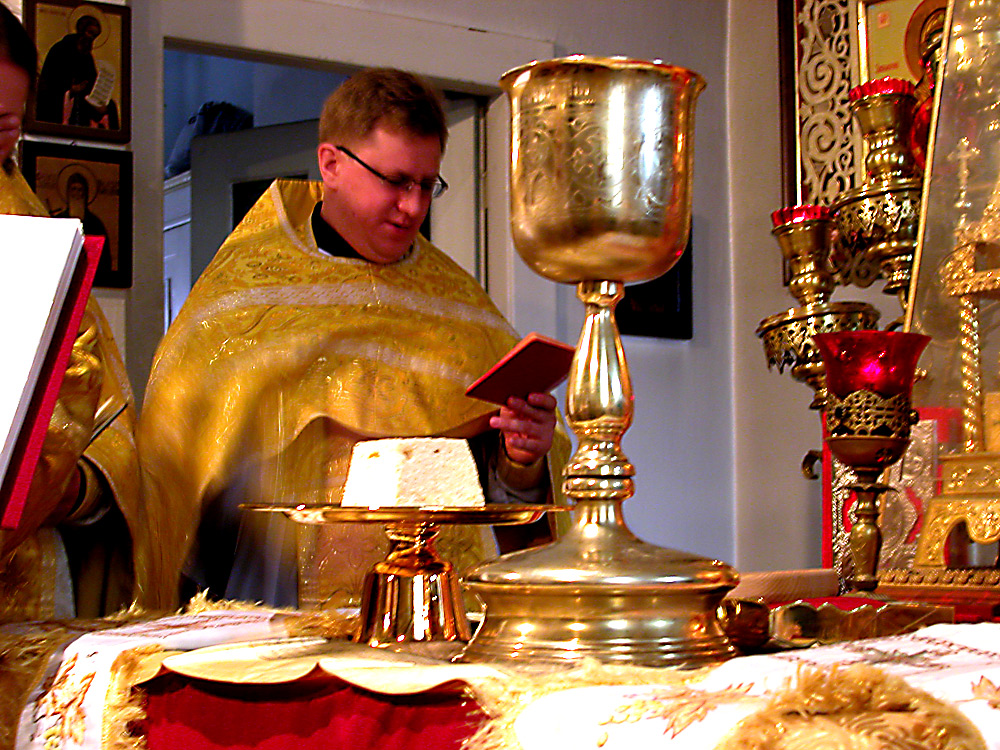
Lamb (host) and chalice during an Eastern Orthodox celebration of the Liturgy of St. James

The Eucharist is at the center of Eastern Christian faith communities, both Eastern Orthodox and Eastern Catholic. Eastern Orthodox Christians affirm the real presence in the Sacred Mysteries (consecrated bread and wine), which they believe to be the actual body and blood of Jesus, transformed through the operation of the Holy Spirit. The Eucharist is normally received in the context of the Divine Liturgy. In Orthodox Eucharistic theology, though many separate Divine Liturgies may be celebrated geographically, the bread and wine present is considered to be part of one whole, rather than numerous different existences of the body and blood of Jesus appearing, separate from each other.

The Eastern Orthodox Church has never clarified or made statement on the exact nature of transformation of the bread and wine, nor gone into the detail that the Roman Catholic Church has with the doctrine of transubstantiation, which was formulated after the Great Schism of 1054; the Eastern Orthodox churches have never formally affirmed or denied this doctrine, preferring to state simply that it is a "Mystery", while at the same time using, as in the 1672 Synod of Jerusalem, language that may appear similar as to that used by the Roman Catholic Church. (Note: For instance, "after the consecration of the bread and of the wine, there no longer remaineth the substance of the bread and of the wine, but the Body Itself and the Blood of the Lord, under the species and form of bread and wine; that is to say, under the accidents of the bread".)

The Anaphora (Eucharistic prayer) contains an anamnesis (lit. "making present"), a liturgical statement recounting the historical facts of Jesus' death, including the Eucharist, Passion, Resurrection and Ascension; in the Eastern Christian churches, the anamnesis is also considered to make these aspects of Jesus' ministry present, forming a link to these events. The Anaphora ends with an epiclesis ("calling down from on high") during which the priest invokes the Holy Spirit to come and "change" the Gifts (elements of bread and wine) into the actual body and blood of Jesus. The Orthodox do not link the moment the Gifts change to the Words of Institution, or indeed to any one particular moment, instead affirming that the change is completed at the Epiclesis.

Communion is given only to baptized, chrismated Orthodox Christians who have prepared by fasting, prayer, and confession (different rules apply for children, elderly, sick, pregnant, etc. and are determined on a case-by-case basis by parish priests). The priest administers the Gifts with a spoon directly into the recipient's mouth from the chalice. From baptism, young infants and children are carried to the chalice to receive Holy Communion.

The holy gifts reserved for the Liturgy of the Presanctified Gifts or communion of the sick are specially consecrated as needed, especially on Holy Thursday. They are kept in an elaborately decorated tabernacle, a container on the altar often in the shape of a church or of a dove. Generally, Eastern Christians do not adore the consecrated bread outside the Liturgy itself. However, they prostrate to the ground during the transfer of the Holy Gifts during the Presanctified Liturgy (the "Entrance"), as a sign of utmost reverence. After the Eucharist has been given to the congregation, the priest or the deacon has to consume the Holy Gifts that are left.

The most perfect expression of the Eucharistic unity of the Eastern churches is considered to be found in the Hierarchical Divine Liturgy (a liturgy at which a bishop is the chief celebrant), as, following the writings of Ignatius of Antioch, the church is considered to be fully present in the presence of a bishop surrounded by clergy and members of the congregation.

=== Lutheran churches ===
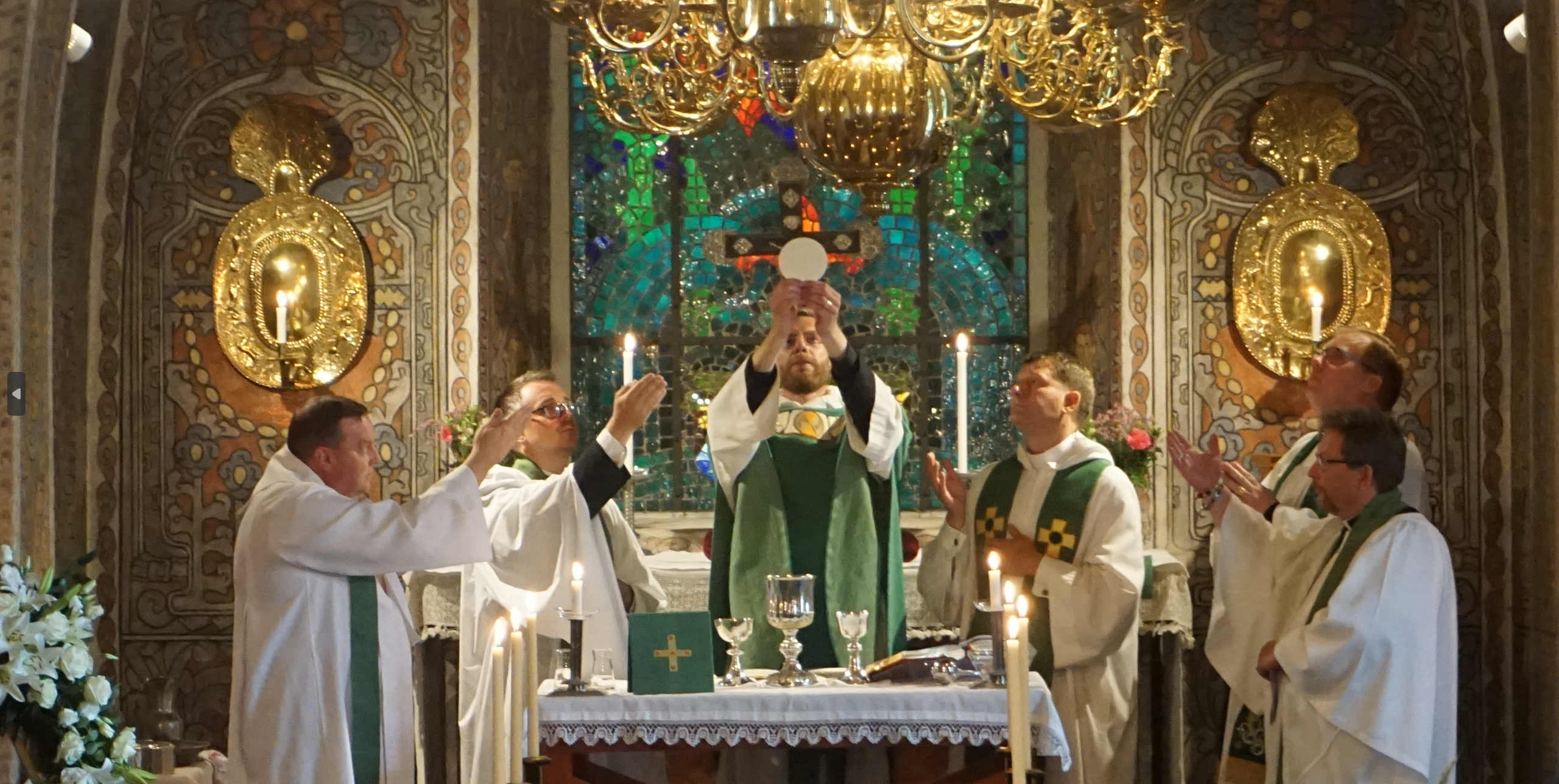
Lutheran priest elevating the host during the celebration of the Holy Mass at Alsike Church, Sweden

Lutherans believe that the body and blood of Jesus are "truly and substantially present in, with and under the forms" of consecrated bread and wine (the elements), so that communicants eat and drink both the elements and the true body and blood of Jesus himself in the Sacrament of the Eucharist whether they are believers or unbelievers. The Lutheran doctrine of the real presence is also known as the sacramental union. This theology was first formally and publicly confessed in the Wittenberg Concord. The Lutheran view has erroneously been called "consubstantiation", and Lutheran theologians reject the use of this term as it creates confusion with an earlier doctrine of the same name. Lutherans use the term "in, with and under the forms of consecrated bread and wine" and "sacramental union" to distinguish their understanding of the Eucharist from those of the Reformed and other traditions.

At some American Lutheran churches (LCMS and WELS for example), closed communion is practiced (meaning the Lutheran Eucharistic catechetical instruction is required for all people before receiving the Eucharist). This is also practiced in many European Lutheran churches as well. Other American Lutheran churches, such as the Evangelical Lutheran Church in America, practice open communion (meaning the Eucharist is offered to adults without receiving the catechetical instruction, as long as they are a baptized Christian).

The celebration of the Eucharist every Lord's Day is the normative practice in Lutheranism, being strongly encouraged by the bishops and priests/pastors. A number of Lutheran churches, monasteries and convents celebrate the Mass daily.

=== Moravian Church and Hussite Church ===
Nicolaus Zinzendorf, a bishop of the Moravian Church, stated that Holy Communion is the "most intimate of all connection with the person of the Saviour".

The Moravian Church adheres to a view known as the "sacramental presence", teaching that in the Sacrament of Holy Communion:

Christ gives his body and blood according to his promise to all who partake of the elements. When we eat and drink the bread and the wine of the Supper with expectant faith, we thereby have communion with the body and blood of our Lord and receive the forgiveness of sins, life, and salvation. In this sense, the bread and wine are rightly said to be Christ's body and blood which he gives to his disciples.

The Moravian Church holds to the real presence of Jesus in the Eucharist, but does not define the precise way that he is sacramentally present. Many Moravian theologians though, believe that the Lutheran doctrine of the sacramental union properly defines the way that Christ is present in Holy Communion, and have historically promulgated that view.

During the Moravian service of Holy Communion, only the scriptural words of institution are used, and thematic hymns are sung during the serving of the sacrament. The Moravian Church practices open communion: all baptized Christians who have confirmed their faith may join in Holy Communion.

=== Reformed churches (Continental Reformed, Presbyterians and Congregationalists) ===
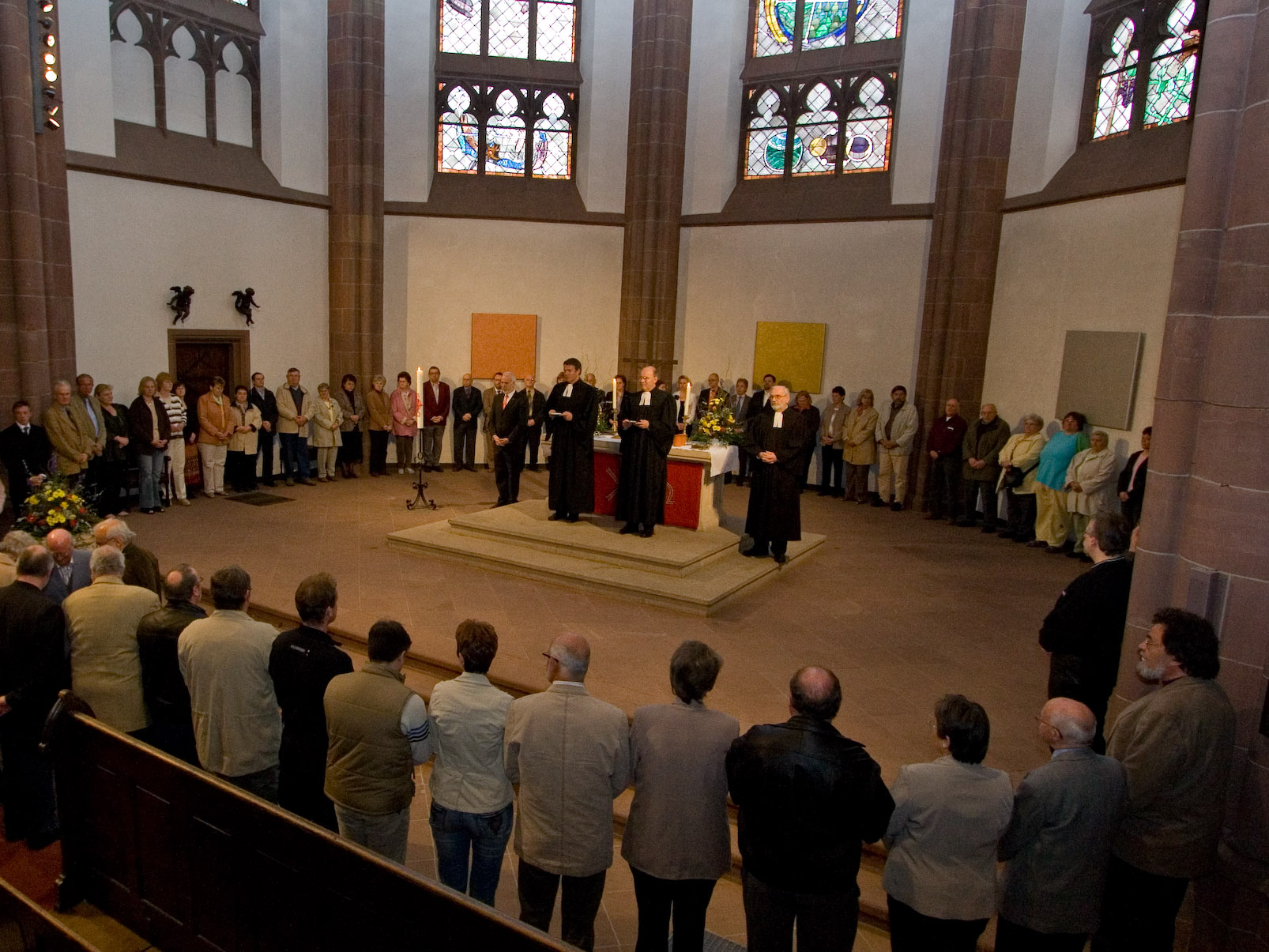
Communion service in the Three-kings Church, Frankfurt am Main.

Reformed Christians (Continental Reformed, Congregationalist, Presbyterian, Reformed Anglican, and Reformed Baptist denominations) hold that Jesus' body and blood are really present in a spiritual way. The elements are considered to be spiritual nourishment in Jesus by faith. According to John Calvin,

The sum is, that the flesh and blood of Christ feed our souls just as bread and wine maintain and support our corporeal life. For there would be no aptitude in the sign, did not our souls find their nourishment in Christ. ... I hold ... that the sacred mystery of the Supper consists of two things—the corporeal signs, which, presented to the eye, represent invisible things in a manner adapted to our weak capacity, and the spiritual truth, which is at once figured and exhibited by the signs.

Following a phrase of Augustine, the Reformed (Calvinist) view is that "no one bears away from this Sacrament more than is gathered with the vessel of faith", and that "The flesh and blood of Christ are no less truly given to the unworthy than to God's elect believers". Instead of mere mental understanding, faith, and the work of the Holy Spirit, are considered necessary in Calvinist theology for the partaker to behold God in the Eucharist, so that by the consumption of bread and wine, Jesus' actual presence penetrates the believer in a greater sense than the consumption of bread and wine. The 'experience' of Eucharist has traditionally been spoken of in the following way: the faithful believers are 'lifted up' by the power of the Holy Spirit to feast with Jesus in heaven. The Lord's Supper in this way is a 'spiritual' experience, as the Holy Spirit is directly involved in the action of 'eucharist'. For the reprobate, although they receive the flesh and blood of Jesus, as the elect do, the Lord's Supper is ineffectual, being no different from ordinary bread and wine.

The Calvinist/Reformed view also places great emphasis on the action of the community as the body of Jesus. As the faith community participates in the action of celebrating the Lord's Supper, the elect among them are 'transformed' into the body of Jesus, or 'reformed' into the body of Jesus each time they participate in this sacrament. In this sense, it has been said that the term "transubstantiation" can be applied to the Church itself being transformed into the real body and blood of Jesus.

The Congregationalist theologian Alfred Ernest Garvie explicated the Congregationalist belief regarding the pneumatic presence in The Holy Catholic Church from the Congregational Point of View:

He is really present at the Lord's Supper without any such limitation to the element unless we are prepared to maintain that the material is more real than the spiritual. It is the whole Christ who presents Himself to faith, so that the believer has communion with Him.

The Presbyterian churches have always emphasized the "Pneumatic Presence" or "Real Presence" in the bread and wine. This meaning that Christians feed upon the body and blood of Jesus in a spiritual sense, as John Calvin had written.

According to Presbyterian doctrine, The Eucharist or Holy Communion is considered "a sacrament of continuous growth, nourishment and new life". In their understanding of the Reformed tradition, the participation in this sacrament should follow the sacrament of baptism. Just as humans need food and drink for nurture and sustenance, Calvin wrote that the Lord's Supper is God's way of providing for the maintenance of sinful humans during the whole course of their lives after they have been received into God's family, in what Presbyterians call "the Covenant Community". Both sacraments (Baptism and Lord's Supper), according to Presbyterian theology, provide a visible and graphic way of presenting God's promises.

The Presbyterian Church quotes the words of John Calvin "a testimony of divine grace toward us, confirmed by an outward sign, with mutual attestation of our piety toward [God]". According to them, a sacrament is a testimony of God's favor toward the church, confirmed by an outward sign, with a mutual testifying of man's godliness toward God. It is a primal physical act in the Church that signifies a spiritual relationship between personal beings.

According to Presbyterian Eucharistic theology, there is no actual "transubstantiation" in the bread and wine, but that Jesus is spiritually present in the elements of the Eucharist, authentically present in the non-atom-based substance, with which they believe that he is con-substantial with God in the Trinity. They teach that Jesus is genuinely there in the elements of the Lord's Supper to be received by them, and not just in their memories, so that it is both a memorial and a presence of Jesus. They teach that receiving the Communion elements is taking the symbolic representation of the body and blood of Jesus into the inmost being, receiving the Jesus who died for the forgiveness and transformation of believers.

Presbyterians believe that the Word of God should be read, proclaimed and enacted in the Lord's Supper as an integral part of worship. The relationship of Word and Sacrament can be understood in the context of the Emmaus Road narrative (Luke 24:13ff). While there are various interpretations of this account, the Presbyterian Church interprets the "breaking of bread" in Luke 24 as a reference to the Lord's Supper.

Recently, some individual Presbyterian churches have gone back to using actual fermented wine, noting that wine in itself is not sinful, but that Jesus made and drank it, and that only excessive drinking of wine and actual drunkenness are wrong and sinful.

The Directory for Worship in the Presbyterian Book of Order encourages the "appropriateness" of frequent celebrations of the Lord's Supper. A few Presbyterian congregations have begun celebrations of the sacrament as often as each Sunday and on other occasions of special significance in the life of the Christian community. On Presbyterian liturgical seasons, such as Holy Week and Easter, the Lord's Supper is especially celebrated and observed in Presbyterian churches. However, frequency alone is not the basic issue in Presbyterianism. Some believe that they need to restore the Biblical pattern of the Lord's Supper on each Sunday to provide a disciplined reminder of a divine act that will help centralize and "re-focus" the rhythm of people's daily lives.

=== Anglican churches ===
The historical position of the Church of England is found in the Thirty-Nine Articles of 1571, which state "the Bread which we break is a partaking of the Body of Christ"; and likewise that "the Cup of Blessing is a partaking of the Blood of Christ" (Articles of Religion, Article XXVIII: Of the Lord's Supper) and that "Transubstantiation is repugnant to Holy Writ". The 39 Articles also state that adoration, or worship per se, of the consecrated elements was not commanded by Jesus. It also stated that those who receive the Eucharist unworthily do not actually receive Jesus, but rather their own condemnation. This view was established during the Protestant Reformation in England, particularly to the theology of Thomas Cranmer, the guiding figure of the English Reformation; Thomas Cranmer aligned himself with the Eucharistic theology of John Calvin, which is reflected in the 28th Article of the Thirty-Nine Articles of the Church of England: "the Body of Christ is given, taken, and eaten, in the Supper, only after an heavenly and spiritual manner." This view is the real spiritual presence (pneumatic presence) and is held by denominations of the Reformed (Continental Reformed, Presbyterian, Congregationalist, and Reformed Anglican) tradition.

Anglicans generally and officially believe in the Real Presence of Jesus in the Eucharist, but the specifics of belief regarding the manner of his presence range from a belief in the historic, Reformed doctrine of the real spiritual presence (held by Reformed Anglicans), to a belief in the corporeal presence (held by Anglo-Catholics). The normal range of Anglican belief ranges from Objective Reality to Pious Silence, depending on the individual Anglican's theology. There are also small minorities on the one hand who affirm transubstantiation or, on the other, reject the doctrine of the Real Presence altogether in favour of a pneumatic presence. The classic Anglican aphorism with regard to this debate is found in a poem by John Donne (sometimes attributed to Elizabeth I):

He was the Word that spake it;
He took the bread and brake it;
and what that Word did make it;
I do believe and take it.

The historic, Reformed Anglican view known as receptionism common among 16th and 17th-century Anglican theologians is that, although in the Eucharist the bread and wine remain unchanged, the faithful communicant receives together with them the body and blood of Jesus.

An Anglican response concerning the Eucharistic Sacrifice ("Sacrifice of the Mass") was set forth in the response Saepius officio of the Archbishops of Canterbury and York to Pope Leo XIII's Papal Encyclical Apostolicae curae. In 1971, the Anglican and Roman Catholic International Commission announced that it had reached "substantial agreement on the doctrine of the Eucharist" in the Windsor Statement on Eucharistic Doctrine from the Anglican-Roman Catholic International Consultation and the later (1979) Elucidation of the ARCIC Windsor Statement, but this was questioned in 1991 by the Official Roman Catholic Final Response to the ARCIC Full Report.

=== Methodist churches ===
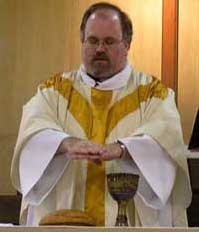
A United Methodist Elder consecrates the elements

Methodists understand the eucharist to be an experience of God's grace, being a sacrament. In keeping with Wesleyan-Arminian theology, God's unconditional love makes the table of God's grace accessible to all, a concept referred to as open communion, though in certain Methodist connexions, the minister meets with the class meeting beforehand to examine those who wish to communicate (see Eucharistic discipline § Methodist practice).

Inheriting the Reformed Anglican view of the Eucharist, according to the "Article XVIII – Of the Lord's Supper" in the Methodist Articles of Religion:

The Supper of the Lord is not only a sign of the love that Christians ought to have among themselves one to another, but rather is a sacrament of our redemption by Christ's death; in so much that, to such as rightly, worthily, and with faith receive the same, the bread which we break is a partaking of the body of Christ; and likewise the cup of blessing is a partaking of the blood of Christ.

Transubstantiation, or the change of the substance of bread and wine in the Supper of our Lord, cannot be proved by Holy Writ, but is repugnant to the plain words of Scripture, overthroweth the nature of a sacrament, and hath given occasion to many superstitions.

The body of Christ is given, taken, and eaten in the Supper, only after a heavenly and spiritual manner. And the mean whereby the body of Christ is received and eaten in the Supper is faith.

The Sacrament of the Lord's Supper was not by Christ's ordinance reserved, carried about, lifted up, or worshiped.

There are various acceptable modes of receiving the Eucharist for Methodists. Some Methodists kneel at communion rails, which delimit the chancel in which the altar (also called the communion table) lies. In other churches, communicants approach the minister who administers the elements in front of the chancel. Methodist Churches ordinarily use "pure, unfermented juice of the grape" instead of alcoholic wine (reflecting its historic commitment to teetotalism), and either leavened yeast bread or unleavened bread. The elements may be distributed in small cups, but the use of a common cup and the practice of communion by intinction (where the bread is dipped into the common cup and both elements are consumed together) is a common among many Methodists.

Methodists believe that the Lord's Supper is a sign and seal of the covenant of grace, reflecting Wesleyan covenant theology:

This covenant, the blood of Christ, that is, the pouring forth of his blood as a sacrficial victim, at once procured and ratified; so that it stands firm to all truly penitent and contrite spirits who believe in him: and of this great truth, the Lord's Supper was the instituted sign and seal; and he who in faith drinks of the cup, having reference to its signification, that blood of Christ which confirms to true believers the whole covenant of grace, is assured thereby of its faithfulness and permanence, and derives to himself the fulness of its blessings.

— Richard Watson, Methodist theologian

Methodist theology affirms the real spiritual presence of Jesus in Holy Communion:

Jesus Christ, who "is the reflection of God's glory and the exact imprint of God's very being" (Hebrews 1:3), is truly present in Holy Communion. Through Jesus Christ and in the power of the Holy Spirit, God meets us at the Table. God, who has given the sacraments to the church, acts in and through Holy Communion. Christ is present through the community gathered in Jesus' name (Matthew 18:20), through the Word proclaimed and enacted, and through the elements of bread and wine shared (1 Corinthians 11:23–26. The divine presence is a living reality and can be experienced by participants; it is not a remembrance of the Last Supper and the Crucifixion only.

Methodists have typically affirmed that the sacrament of Holy Communion is an instrumental Means of Grace through which the real spiritual presence of Jesus is communicated to the believer, but have otherwise allowed the details to remain a mystery. In particular, Methodists reject the Catholic doctrine of transubstantiation (see Article XVIII of the Articles of Religion); the Primitive Methodist Church in its Discipline also rejects the Lollard doctrine of consubstantiation. In 2004, the United Methodist Church reaffirmed its view of the sacrament and its belief in the Real Presence in an official document entitled This Holy Mystery.

The Methodist Church holds the position of unequivocal recognition of the anamnesis as more than just a memorial, but instead a re-presentation of Jesus:

Holy Communion is remembrance, commemoration, and memorial, but this remembrance is much more than simply intellectual recalling. "Do this in remembrance of me" (Luke 22:19; 1 Corinthians 11:24-25) is anamnesis (the biblical Greek word). This dynamic action becomes re-presentation of past gracious acts of God in the present, so powerfully as to make them truly present now. Christ is risen and is alive here and now, not just remembered for what was done in the past.

Methodists, in affirming the Real Spiritual Presence, assert that Jesus is really present, and that the way he is present is a "Holy Mystery"; a common Methodist hymn sung during the celebration of the Lord's Supper is Come Sinners to the Gospel Feast, written by Methodist Charles Wesley, which includes the following stanza:

Come and partake the gospel feast,
Be saved from sin, in Jesus rest;
O taste the goodness of our God,
and eat his flesh and drink his blood.

Methodists believe that Holy Communion should not only be available to the clergy in both forms (the bread and the cup), but to the layperson as well. According to Article XIX of the Methodist Articles of Religion:

The cup of the Lord is not to be denied to the lay people; for both the parts of the Lord's Supper, by Christ's ordinance and commandment, ought to be administered to all Christians alike.

In conformity with The Sunday Service of the Methodists, Methodism's first liturgical text, in congregations of the Allegheny Wesleyan Methodist Connection, African Methodist Episcopal Zion Church, Bethel Methodist Church, Bible Holiness Church, Congregational Methodist Church, Evangelical Methodist Church, Evangelical Wesleyan Church, First Congregational Methodist Church, Free Methodist Church, Lumber River Conference of the Holiness Methodist Church, Metropolitan Church Association, New Congregational Methodist Church, Pilgrim Holiness Church, Southern Congregational Methodist Church, Wesleyan Holiness Association of Churches, among many other Methodist connexions, the presider says the following when delivering the Eucharistic elements to each of the faithful (which is reflective of the Methodist teachings of the real presence of Christ in the Lord's Supper and the Lord's Supper being a sacramental means of grace):

The body of our Lord Jesus Christ, which was given for thee, preserve thy soul and body unto everlasting life. Take and eat this in remembrance that Christ died for thee, and feed on Him in thy heart, by faith with thanksgiving.

The blood of our Lord Jesus Christ, which was given for thee, preserve thy soul and body unto everlasting life. Drink this in remembrance that Christ’s blood was shed for thee, and be thankful.

This affirmation of Real Presence is further illustrated in the language of the United Methodist Eucharistic Liturgy where, in the epiclesis of the Great Thanksgiving, the celebrating minister prays over the elements:

Pour out your Holy Spirit on us gathered here, and on these gifts of bread and wine. Make them be for us the body and blood of Christ that we may be for the world the body of Christ, redeemed by his blood.

The Salvation Army, though upholding Wesleyan-Arminian theology, does not practice the sacrament of Holy Communion as it considers it to be "non-essential to Christian faith". The Sacrament of the Sacred Moment states that "Salvationists have proved that the deep experience of communion with Jesus can be understood and practised without the use of the elements familiar to the various symbolic rites used in most churches".

=== Anabaptist churches ===
The Seven Ordinances observed in the Conservative Anabaptist churches include "baptism, communion, footwashing, marriage, anointing with oil, the holy kiss, and the prayer covering."

In the early Anabaptist Schleitheim Confession, breaking of bread is the term used for the Lord's Supper, also known as communion or eucharist. A Short Confession of Faith, compiled by the early Anabaptist theologian Hans de Ries, articulated the belief in the real spiritual presence of Christ in the Lord's Supper:

28. There are ... sacraments appointed by Christ, in his holy church, the administration whereof he hath assigned to the ministry of teaching, namely, the Holy Baptism and the Holy Supper. These are outward visible handlings and tokens, setting before our eyes, on God’s side, the inward spiritual handling which God, through Christ, by the cooperation of the Holy Ghost, setteth forth the justification in the penitent faithful soul; and which, on our behalf, witnesseth our religion, experience, faith, and obedience, through the obtaining of a good conscience to the service of God.

31. The Holy Supper, according to the institution of Christ, is to be administered to the baptized; as the Lord Jesus hath commanded that whatsoever he hath appointed should be taught to be observed.

32. The whole dealing in the outward visible supper, setteth before the eye, witnesseth and signifyeth, that Christ’s body was broken upon the cross and his holy blood spilt for the remission of our sins. That the being glorified in his heavenly Being, is the alive-making bread, meat, and drink of our souls: it setteth before our eyes Christ’s office and ministry in glory and majesty, by holding his spiritual supper, which the believing soul, feeding and . . . the soul with spiritual food: it teacheth us by the outward handling to mount upwards with the heart in holy prayer, to beg at Christ’s hands the true signified food; and it admonisheth us of thankfulness to God, and of verity and love one with another.

In Anabaptism, the corporate nature (fellowship, unity) of participation is emphasized to a greater degree than other Christian denominations. Pilgram Marpeck wrote, "As members of one body, we proclaim the death of Christ and bodily union attained by untainted brotherly love." Marpeck further wrote, "The true meaning of communion is mystified and obscured by the word sacrament." In connection with the Lord's supper, many Anabaptists stress the rite of feet washing. Anabaptists do not as much emphasize the presence of Jesus in the eucharistic elements themselves, but the "mystery of communion with the living Christ in his Supper [that] comes into being by the power of the Spirit, dwelling in and working through the collected members of Christ's Body". As such, in celebrations of Holy Communion, "Anabaptist congregations looked to the living Christ in their hearts and in their midst, who transformed members and elements together into a mysterious communion, creating his Body in many members, ground like grains and crushed like grapes, into one bread and one drink."

Anabaptism sees itself as emulating the practice of early Christianity, and in the present-day, a number of Anabaptist congregations have affirmed a theology of the real presence (such as the Chambersburg Christian Fellowship).

=== Baptist churches ===
Reformed Baptists, in agreement with Presbyterians and other Reformed churches, hold to the doctrine of Pneumatic presence. The doctrine is articulated in the 1689 Baptist Confession of Faith and the Catechism. It holds that the Lord's Supper to be a means of "spiritual nourishment and growth", stating:

The supper of the Lord Jesus was instituted by him the same night wherein he was betrayed, to be observed in his churches, unto the end of the world, for the perpetual remembrance, and showing to all the world the sacrifice of himself in his death, confirmation of the faith of believers in all the benefits thereof, their spiritual nourishment, and growth in him, their further engagement in, and to all duties which they owe to him; and to be a bond and pledge of their communion with him, and with each other.

The General Baptist denominations differ in their approach to the Lord's Supper, ranging from the affirmation of a real spiritual presence to memorialism. General Baptists, such as Free Will Baptists, have historically affirmed the teaching of the real spiritual presence of Christ in the Lord's Supper. Helwys Confession, written by the early General Baptists in 1611, stated:

That the Lord’s Supper is the outward manifestation of the spiritual communion between Christ and the faithful, mutually to declare His death until He come” (1 Cor. 10:16, 17, 11:26).

The American Baptist Churches USA, a mainline Baptist denomination, believes that "The bread and cup that symbolize the broken body and shed blood offered by Christ remind us today of God's great love for us". The Southern Baptist Convention, the world's largest Baptist denomination, officially holds to a memorialist view of the Lord's Supper.

=== Irvingian churches ===
Edward Irving, who founded the Irvingian churches, such as the New Apostolic Church, taught the real presence of Jesus in the Eucharist, emphasizing "the humiliated humanity of Christ in the Lord's Supper." Additionally, the Irvingian churches affirm the "real presence of the sacrifice of Jesus Christ in Holy Communion":

Jesus Christ is in the midst of the congregation as the crucified, risen, and returning Lord. Thus His once-brought sacrifice is also present in that its effect grants the individual access to salvation. In this way, the celebration of Holy Communion causes the partakers to repeatedly envision the sacrificial death of the Lord, which enables them to proclaim it with conviction (1 Corinthians 11:26).

In the Irvingian tradition of Restorationist Christianity, consubstantiation is taught as the explanation of how the real presence is effected in the liturgy.

=== Zwinglianism ===
Some Protestant groups regard the Eucharist (also called the Lord's Supper or the Lord's Table) as a symbolic meal, a memorial of the Last Supper and the Passion in which nothing miraculous occurs. This view is known as the Zwinglian view, after Huldrych Zwingli, a Church leader in Zürich, Switzerland during the Reformation (though the Reformed churches to which Zwingli belonged embraced the Calvinist view of the real spiritual presence). Memorialism is commonly associated with the Plymouth Brethren, Unitarians, certain General Baptists and the Disciples of Christ. Elements left over from the service may be discarded without any formal ceremony, or if feasible may be retained for use in future services.

The Plymouth Brethren hold the Lord's Supper, or the Breaking of Bread, instituted in the upper room on Christ's betrayal night, to be the weekly remembrance feast enjoined on all true Christians. They celebrate the supper in utmost simplicity. Among "closed" Brethren assemblies usually any one of the brothers gives thanks for the loaf and the cup. In conservative "open" Brethren assemblies usually two different brothers give thanks, one for the loaf and the other for the cup. In liberal "open" Brethren assemblies (or churches/community chapels, etc.) sisters also participate with audible prayer.

The Racovian Catechism of Unitarian Christianity teaches that "this rite is to be observed for the purpose of commemorating or showing forth the kindness manifested by Christ towards us".

The Seventh-day Adventists believe that the Lord's Supper is "a participation in the emblems of the body and blood of Jesus as an expression of faith in Him, our Lord and Saviour". In the communion service "Christ is present to meet and strengthen His people."

=== Jehovah's Witnesses ===
The Jehovah's Witnesses view the bread and wine of the Lord's Supper as symbolically representing and commemorating the sinless body and blood of the Jesus, but do not consider that the elements become supernaturally altered, or that Jesus' actual physical presence is literally in the bread and wine. Instead, the elements (which they generally call "emblems") are commemorative and symbolic, and are consecrated for the Lord's Supper observance, being figurative of the body and blood of Jesus, as the true "Lamb of God", and view the celebration as an anti-typical fulfillment of the Jewish Passover celebration, which memorialized the freeing and rescuing of God's people, the Israelites, from bondage in Egypt. The Witnesses commemorate Jesus' death as a ransom or propitiatory sacrifice by observing a Memorial annually on the evening that corresponds to the Passover, Nisan 14, according to the Jewish calendar. They refer to this observance generally as "the Lord's Evening Meal" or the "Memorial of Christ's Death", taken from Jesus' words to his Apostles, "do this as a memorial of me" (Luke 22:19). They believe that this is the only annual religious observance commanded for Christians in the Bible.

Of those who attend the Memorial, a small minority worldwide partake of the wine and unleavened bread. Jehovah's Witnesses believe that only 144,000 people will receive heavenly salvation and immortal life and thus spend eternity with God and Jesus in heaven, with glorified bodies, as under-priests and co-rulers under Christ the King and High Priest, in Jehovah's Kingdom. Paralleling the anointing of kings and priests, they are referred to as the "anointed" class and the only ones who should partake of the bread and wine. They believe that the baptized "other sheep" of Jesus' flock, or the "great crowd", also benefit from the ransom sacrifice, and are respectful observers and viewers of the Lord's Supper remembrance at these special meetings of Jehovah's witnesses.

The Memorial, held after sundown, includes a sermon on the meaning and importance of the celebration and gathering, and includes the circulation and viewing among the audience of unadulterated red wine and unleavened bread (matzo). Jehovah's Witnesses believe that the bread symbolizes and represents Jesus' perfect body which he gave on behalf of mankind, and that the wine represents his perfect blood which he shed at Calvary and redeems fallen man from inherited sin and death. The wine and the bread (sometimes referred to as "emblems") are viewed as symbolic and commemorative; the Witnesses do not believe in transubstantiation or consubstantiation; so not a literal presence of flesh and blood in the emblems, but that the emblems are simply sacred symbolisms and representations, denoting what was used in the first Lord's Supper, and which figuratively represent the ransom sacrifice of Jesus and sacred realities.

=== Quakers ===
Quakers' Eucharistic theology is Memorialism: "The bread and wine remind us of Jesus' body and blood." However, they also hold to suspension: they do not practice Holy Communion in their worship, believing it was not meant to be a perpetually mandated ritual. Nonetheless, Quakers understand all of life as being sacramental: "We believe in the baptism of the Holy Spirit and in communion with that Spirit. If the believer experiences such spiritual baptism and communion, then no rite or ritual is necessary. ... The Quaker ideal is to make every meal at every table a Lord's Supper."

=== Latter Day Saint movement ===
Among Latter Day Saints (Mormons), the Eucharist (referred to as the "Sacrament") is partaken in remembrance of the blood and body of Jesus. It is viewed as a renewal of the covenant made at baptism, which is to take upon oneself the name of Jesus. As such, it is considered efficacious only for baptized members in good standing. However, the unbaptized are not forbidden from communion, and it is traditional for children not yet baptized (baptism occurs only after the age of eight) to participate in communion in anticipation of baptism. Those who partake of the Sacrament promise always to remember Jesus and keep his commandments. The prayer also asks God the Father that each individual will be blessed with God's Spirit.

The Sacrament is offered weekly and all active members are taught to prepare to partake of each opportunity. It is considered to be a weekly renewal of a member's commitment to follow Jesus, and a plea for forgiveness of sins.

The Latter Day Saints do not have official teachings which outline any kind of literal presence. They view the bread and water as symbolic of the body and blood of Jesus. Currently the Church of Jesus Christ of Latter-day Saints uses water instead of wine. Early in their history, the Sacrament wine was often purchased from enemies of the church. To remove any opportunity for poisoned or unfit wine for use in the Sacrament, it is believed a revelation from the Lord was given that stated "it mattereth not what ye shall eat or what ye shall drink when ye partake of the sacrament, if it so be that ye do it with an eye single to my glory—remembering unto the Father my body which was laid down for you, and my blood which was shed for the remission of your sins." After this time, water was permitted in place of wine, but the church continued to use wine for the sacrament until the early 20th century. As the church's prohibition on alcohol became solidified in the early 20th century, water became the liquid of choice for the Sacrament, although in situations where clean water and/or fresh bread is unavailable the closest equivalent may be used.

== See also ==
- Origin of the Eucharist
- Anglican Eucharistic theology
- Eucharistic discipline
- Historical roots of Catholic Eucharistic theology
- Typology (theology)
