= Eucharist in Anglicanism =

Holy sacrament of the Eucharist in Anglicanism, a major branch of Protestantism

Anglican eucharistic theology is diverse in thought and practice. Its sources include prayer book rubrics, writings on sacramental theology by Anglican divines, and the regulations and orientations of ecclesiastical provinces. The principal source material is the Book of Common Prayer (BCP), specifically its eucharistic prayers and Article XXVIII of the Thirty-Nine Articles. Article XXVIII comprises the foundational Anglican doctrinal statement about the Eucharist, although its interpretation varies among churches of the Anglican Communion and in different traditions of churchmanship such as Anglo-Catholicism and Evangelical Anglicanism.

Anglican eucharistic theologies universally affirm the real presence of Christ in the Eucharist, though Reformed Anglicans believe that this is a pneumatic presence, while those of an Anglo-Catholic churchmanship believe this is a corporeal presence. In the former interpretation, those who receive the form or sign of the body and blood (bread and wine) in faith, receive also the spiritual body and blood of Christ. Those who receive the form or sign without faith, or for those who are wicked, Christ is not present spiritually and they consume only the physical signs of this holy presence, which further adds to their wickedness – in accordance with Article XXIX. In the latter interpretation, there exists the corporeal presence of Christ in the Eucharist, although the precise manner of how that presence is made manifest is a mystery of faith. To explain the manner of Christ's presence, some high-church Anglicans, however, teach the philosophical explanation of consubstantiation, associated with the English Lollards and, later, erroneously with Martin Luther, though Luther and the Lutheran Churches explicitly rejected the doctrine of consubstantiation and actually promulgated their dogma of the sacramental union. A major leader in the Anglo-Catholic Oxford Movement, Edward Pusey, championed the view of consubstantiation. A number of Anglicans who affirm a corporeal presence have embraced the Evangelical-Lutheran doctrine of the sacramental union.

== Sacramental theology ==
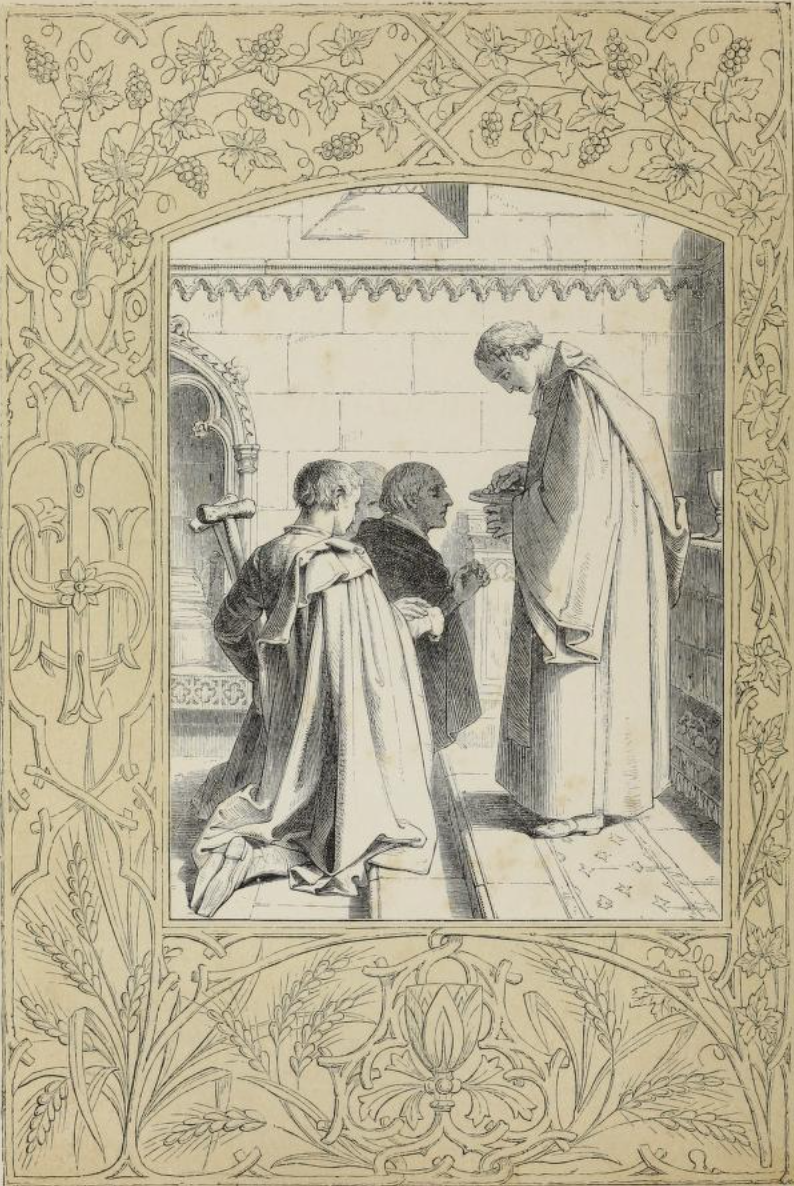
"The Holy Communion", full-page illustration from the 1845 illuminated Book of Common Prayer, drawn by John C. Horsley.

With the Eucharist, as with other aspects of theology, Anglicans are largely directed by the principle of lex orandi, lex credendi which means "the law of prayer is the law of belief". In other words, sacramental theology as it pertains to the Eucharist is sufficiently and fully articulated by the Book of Common Prayer of a given jurisdiction. As defined by the 16th-century Anglican theologian Richard Hooker, the sacraments are said to be "visible signs of invisible grace"; similarly the Catechism of the 1662 version states that a sacrament is "an outward and visible sign of an inward and spiritual grace given to us, ordained by Christ himself, as a means whereby we receive the same, and a pledge to assure us thereof." It thus has the effect of conveying sanctification in the individual participating in the sacrament. According to this, in the Eucharist the outward and visible sign is "bread and wine" and the "thing signified", the "body and blood of Christ", which are truly taken and received by the faithful in the Lord's supper.

Sacraments have both form and matter. Form is the verbal and physical liturgical action, while the matter refers to material objects used (bread and wine). In an Anglican Eucharist the form is contained in the rite and its rubrics, as articulated in the authorised prayer books of the ecclesiastical province. Central to the rite is the eucharistic prayer or "Prayer of Consecration", as called in the Book of Common Prayer.

For the vast majority of Anglicans, the Eucharist (also called "Holy Communion", "Mass", the Divine Liturgy, the "Lord's Supper", or The Great Thanksgiving), is the central act of gathered worship, the appointed means by which Christ can become present to his church. For the majority of Anglicans this event constitutes the renewal of the Body of Christ as the Church through the reception of the Body of Christ as the Blessed Sacrament, his spiritual body and blood. In this sacrament, Christ is both encountered and incorporated (they "partake" of him). As such, the eucharistic action looks backward as a memorial of Christ's sacrifice, forward as a foretaste of the heavenly banquet and to the present as an incarnation of Christ in the lives of the community and of individual believers.

Anglican doctrine concerning the Eucharist is contained in Article XXVIII – Of the Lord's Supper and XXIX – Of the Wicked which eat not the Body of Christ of the Thirty-Nine Articles. The Catechism of the Church of England, the foundational church of the Anglican Communion, is found in the Book of Common Prayer and states that, as with other sacraments, the Eucharist is "an outward and visible sign of an inward and spiritual grace given unto us, ordained by Christ himself, as a means whereby we receive the same, and a pledge to assure us thereof". The outward sign, in this instance, is the bread and wine; and the thing signified is the body and blood of Christ.

== Varieties of eucharistic theology ==
Because of the various theological movements which have influenced Anglicanism throughout history, there is no one sacramental theory accepted by all Anglicans. Early Anglican theologians, such as Thomas Cranmer and Richard Hooker, held to a sacramental theology similar to John Calvin. Cranmer's belief was substantially Calvinist, Receptionism and Virtualism, as shown by Peter Brooks in 1965. Hooker's was a more nuanced combination of Receptionism and Real Presence but agnostic as to what the elements were in themselves but insistent that "the sacrament is a true and a real participation of Christ, who thereby imparteth himself even in his whole entire Person as a Mystical Head". He brushes aside transubstantiation and consubstantiation and urges people to meditate in silence and less to dispute the manner 'how'. The views were congenial for centuries to the majority of Anglicans. The 19th-century Oxford Movement sought to give the Eucharist a more prominent place and upheld belief in the real presence of Christ in the sacrament. Anglicans now hold a variety of sacramental theologies, representing a spectrum of theories found in other Christian traditions.

=== Pneumatic presence ===
The reformed Anglican belief in a real spiritual presence (pneumatic presence) has roots going back to the English Reformation, particularly to the theology of Thomas Cranmer, the guiding figure of the Protestant Reformation in England; Thomas Cranmer aligned himself with the Eucharistic theology of John Calvin, which is reflected in the 28th Article of the Thirty-Nine Articles of the Church of England: "the Body of Christ is given, taken, and eaten, in the Supper, only after an heavenly and spiritual manner." The view of the real spiritual presence (pneumatic presence) is held by denominations of the Reformed (Continental Reformed, Presbyterian, Congregationalist, and Reformed Anglican) tradition.

It is clear that, in rejecting Roman Catholic doctrine on this point, Cranmer has also rejected Luther's views and adopted Calvin's position. The sacrament is not merely a symbol of what takes place in the heart, but neither is it the physical eating of the body of Christ. This must be so, because the body of Christ is in heaven and therefore our participation in it can only be spiritual. Only the believers are the true partakers of the body and blood of Christ, for the unbelievers eat and drink no more than bread and wine—and condemnation upon themse[l]ves, for the profanation of the Lord's Table. These views are reflected in the Thirty-nine articles, of which the twenty-eighth says that "the Body of the Christ is given, taken, and eaten, in the Supper, only after an heavently and spiritual manner. The next article says of the wicked that "in no wise are they partakers of Christ," although "to their condemnation [they] do eat and rink the sign or Sacrament of so great a thing." This marked Calvinistic influence would prove very significant for the history of Christianity in England during the seventeenth century… —Justo L. González

Low-church Anglicans reject belief in a corporeal presence of Christ in the Eucharist, and accordingly, usually any belief in the reservation and adoration of the sacrament. Reservation was eliminated in practice by the rubric at the end of the 1662 Communion service which ordered the reverent consumption of any consecrated bread and wine immediately after the blessing, and adoration by the "Declaration concerning Kneeling". Instead, they hold to a "spiritual real presence" view of the Eucharist similar to the views held by Reformed Protestant denominations such as Presbyterians. Low-church parishes and ministers tend to celebrate the Eucharist less frequently (e.g., monthly) and prefer the terms "Holy Communion" or "Lord's Supper". This view has historical precedent. During the seminal years of the English Reformation, Thomas Cranmer was in correspondence with many continental Reformers, several of whom came to England at his request to aid in reforms there. They included Martin Bucer, Paul Fagius, Peter Martyr Vermigli, Bernardino Ochino and Jan Łaski. The views of these men were in line with the Reformed doctrine of the sacrament.

Cranmer wrote on the Eucharist in his treatise On the True and Catholic Doctrine of the Lord's Supper that Christians truly receive Christ's "self-same" Body and Blood at Communion – but in "an heavenly and spiritual manner" which is close to the Calvinistic doctrine. This emphasis on the faith of the receiver instead of the elements, common to both the Continental Reformed churches and the Church of England, has also been called receptionism. This is in agreement with the continental Reformed view found in Chapter XXI of the Second Helvetic Confession:

There is also a spiritual eating of Christ's body; not such that we think that thereby the food itself is to be changed into spirit, but whereby the body and blood of the Lord, while remaining in their own essence and property, are spiritually communicated to us, certainly not in a corporeal but in a spiritual way, by the Holy Spirit, who applies and bestows upon us these things which have been prepared for us by the sacrifice of the Lord's body and blood for us, namely, the remission of sins, deliverance, and eternal life; so that Christ lives in us and we live in him, and he causes us to receive him by true faith to this end that he may become for us such spiritual food and drink, that is, our life. But he who comes to this sacred Table of the Lord without faith, communicates only in the sacrament and does not receive the substance of the sacrament whence comes life and salvation; and such men unworthily eat of the Lord's Table. Whoever eats the bread or drinks the cup of the Lord in an unworthy manner will be guilty of the body and blood of the Lord, and eats and drinks judgment upon himself (I Cor. 11:26–29). For when they do not approach with true faith, they dishonor the death of Christ, and therefore eat and drink condemnation to themselves.

A term used to define the Reformed doctrine of the real spiritual presence common amongst 16th- and 17th-century Anglican theologians is known as "receptionism", a term not found before 1867. According to this view, although the bread and wine remain unchanged, through the worthy reception of the sacrament the communicant receives the body and blood of Christ. It remained "the dominant theological position in the Church of England until the Oxford Movement in the early nineteenth century, with varying degrees of emphasis". It is important to remember that it is "a doctrine of the real presence" but one which "relates the presence primarily to the worthy receiver rather than to the elements of bread and wine".

=== Corporeal presence ===
Anglicans of Anglo-Catholic churchmanship, as well as some high-church Evangelicals, hold to a belief in the corporeal presence of Christ in the Eucharist, but maintain that the details of how Christ is made present remain a mystery of faith, a view also held by the Orthodox Church, Lutheran Church, and Methodist Church. Holding this view, "the Tractarians were concerned ... to exalt the importance of the sacrament", but were "generally hostile to the doctrine of transubstantiation". Article XXVIII of the Thirty-Nine Articles declares that "Transubstantiation ... cannot be proved by Holy Writ; but is repugnant to the plain words of Scripture, overthroweth the nature of a Sacrament, and hath given occasion to many superstitions." Edgar Gibson, the Bishop of Gloucester, who was Anglo-Catholic in churchmanship, defended the phrase "cannot be Proved by Holy Writ" in Article XXVIII, stating,

It is hard to see how a philosophical theory such as Transubstantiation confessedly is, can ever be "proved by Holy Writ". Romanists point to the words of institution, Τοῦτο ἐστι τό σῶμά μου. But though they can certainly be claimed in the favour of the real Presence, yet to bring into them a theory of "accidents" remaining while the "substance" is changed, is to read into the text that which is certainly not contained in it, and what we deny can reasonably be referred from it.

A number of Anglicans have embraced the Evangelical-Lutheran doctrine of the coporeal presence—the sacramental union.

The doctrine of consubstantiation, which originated out of the pre-Reformation Lollardy movement in England, is a view of the corporeal presence with which some Anglicans identify. The 19th-century Anglo-Catholic divine Edward Bouverie Pusey (a leader of the Oxford Movement) argued strongly for the idea of consubstantiation. Discussing Pusey's view, Thomas S. L. Vogan wrote:

I cannot deem it unfair to apply the name of Consubstantiation to a doctrine which teaches, that "the true flesh and true blood of Christ are in the true bread and wine", in such a way that "whatsoever motion or action the bread" and wine have, the body and blood "of Christ also" have "the same"; and that "the substances in both cases" are "so mingled—that they should constitute some one thing".

In this doctrine, the bread and wine do not disappear at the consecration, but the Body and Blood become present without diminishing them.

Although it originated with Lollardism, consubstantiation is erroneously said to be the doctrine of Martin Luther and the Lutheran churches, which actually reject consubstantiation and instead teach the doctrine of sacramental union.

A maxim in Anglicanism concerning Christ's presence is that "it may not be about a change of substance, but it is about a substantial change." If substantial denotes a spiritual property of the sacraments themselves this is the Reformed view, since, after consecration, the elements are only fit for holy use and may no longer be used as common bread and wine.

This view is expressed in the allied but metaphysically different doctrines of consubstantiation and sacramental union. Both views hold that Christ is present in the eucharistic elements spiritually. Such spiritual presence may or may not be believed to be in bodily form, depending on the particular doctrinal position. It may in fact be a mystical, yet still physical, Body of Christ, as some Anglicans hold, or a superphysical reality "superimposed" in, with, and under the bread and wine. Although this is similar to consubstantiation, it is different as it has a decidedly mystical emphasis.

== Shape of the rite ==
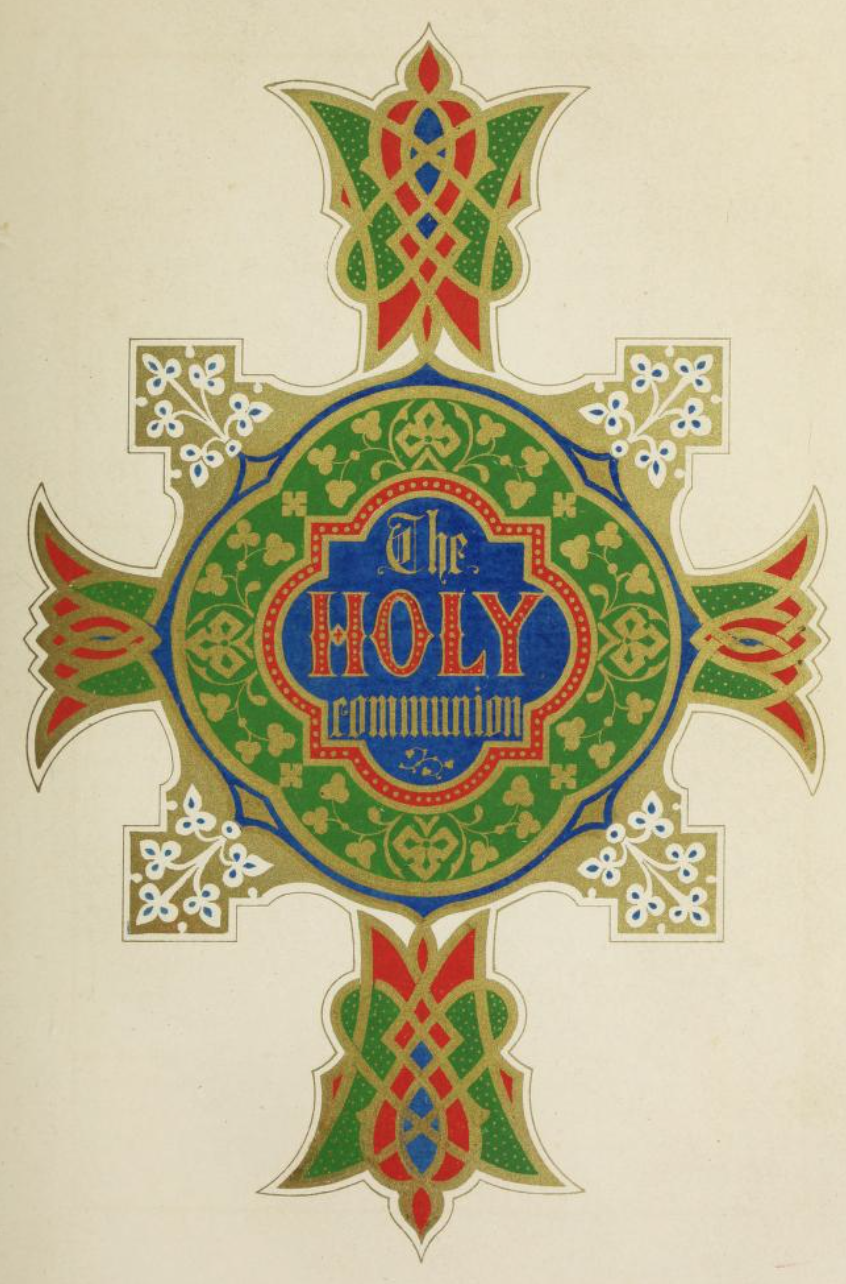
Illuminated title of "The Holy Communion" from the 1845 illustrated Book of Common Prayer, designed by Owen Jones.

As mentioned above, the liturgy for the Eucharist is important in Anglican eucharistic theology because of the principle of lex orandi, lex credendi. The liturgy is defined in the authorised prayer books of the various national churches and ecclesiastical provinces of the communion. The eucharistic rites follow one or other of two main sources, either the First English Prayer Book of 1549 or the Second of 1552 which, with minor modifications, became the 1662 Book BCP which is still today the official and legal reference-point for the Church of England. The author of both rites was Thomas Cranmer, who maintained that there was no theological difference between the two, but was forced to make its reformed theology more obvious when conservative clergy hostile to the English Reformation took advantage of loopholes in the 1549 prayer book to make the new liturgy as much like the old Latin Mass as possible, including elevating the Eucharist.

Some or all of the following elements may be altered, transposed, or absent depending on the rite used by the province or national church. In modern liturgies whichever source (1549 or 1552) they follow for the sacrament, the Liturgy of the Word has, with variations, a fairly standard pattern:

- The Liturgy of the Word
  - The Gathering of the Community: beginning with the Lord's Prayer, followed by the Collect for Purity, the ten commandments or the Summary of the Law; and then the Collect of the day.
  - The Proclamation of the Word: Usually two to three readings of Scripture, one of which is always from the Gospels. This is followed by a sermon or homily; the recitation of the Apostles' or Nicene Creed;
  - The Prayers of the People: Very varied in form. The passing of the peace may be placed here.
- The Liturgy of Sacrament (1549, Scottish Canon, recent prayer books)
  - The Celebration of the Eucharist: The gifts of bread and wine are received, along with other gifts (such as money and/or food for a food bank, etc.), and an offertory prayer is recited. Following this, a eucharistic prayer (called "The Great Thanksgiving") is recited. This prayer consists of a dialogue (the Sursum Corda), a preface, the sanctus and benedictus, the Words of Institution, the anamnesis, the oblation or presentation of the gifts to God in the sacrifice of praise and thanksgiving, the epiclesis or request that the Holy Spirit descend upon the gifts and sanctify them to be the Body and Blood of Jesus, an eschatological statement about the end time, doxology and congregational assent, Amen. The entire prayer is consecratory. The Lord's Prayer follows, and is followed by the fraction (the breaking of the bread), the Prayer of Humble Access, which is optional, the Agnus Dei, and the distribution of the sacred elements (the bread and wine). There is a post-Communion prayer. A doxology or general prayer of thanksgiving may follow. The service concludes with a Trinitarian blessing and the dismissal.
- The Liturgy of Sacrament (1552–1662 style):
  - The priest prepares the table. Invitation to examine oneself, confession, absolution, "comfortable words". The Sursum Corda, preface, the sanctus, Prayer of Humble Access, Words of Institution. Then comes the distribution of the elements, the Lord's Prayer, concluding prayer of thanksgiving, the Gloria in Excelsis Deo and blessing.

The theology of these rites has been considerably modified in the last 200 years, with the reintroduction of oblationary language as pertaining to an objective, material sacrifice offered to God in union with Christ. The Prayer Books of 1552, 1559, 1604 and 1662 placed sacrificial language in a post-communion prayer in order to detach it from the context of the eucharistic prayer. A prime example of these modifications can be found in the American Book of Common Prayer introduced by the first American Episcopal bishop Samuel Seabury and adopted by the General Convention of the Protestant Episcopal Church in 1789. He insisted on the adoption of a full eucharistic prayer of the non-Juror Scottish Episcopal Church Rite to replace the truncated version of the earlier English rites beginning in 1552. The adopted prayer included the words, "with these thy holy gifts, which we now offer unto thee", which were inserted after the words from the 1549 Rite "we, thy humble servants, do celebrate and make before thy Divine Majesty, and before the words "the memorial thy Son hath commanded us to make" BCP (cf. these changes in the article on Samuel Seabury). An epiclesis was also restored. The insertion of these ten words in effect undid Cranmer's theology that the sacrifice of praise and thanksgiving was restricted to words and sentiments in prayer.

=== Church of England ===
Throughout the 20th century the Eucharist in the Church of England has undergone a number of significant changes, and in most churches the BCP is no longer used for many services. The Prayer Book (Alternative and Other Services) Measure of 1965 redefined where "lawful authority lay".

- The Book of Common Prayer 1662
- A new concept of alternative services that could be authorised for up to seven years. Further authorisation of seven years could be granted by General Synod.
- Provision for making legal other services outside the range of Book of Common Prayer such as family services.

Under the new measure all services that the 1928 deposited prayer book that had been in use for nearly 40 years on the say so of individual bishops lost all legal authority. They would then have to authorised as alternate services. The Liturgical Commission would not assist in this process so it was left to the House of Bishops to edit a set of rites from 1928 and publish them. These were published in December 1965 as were later to be known as Series 1. At the same time the Liturgical Commission also produced and published texts in readiness for the new measures to come into force and these were known as Series 2. The Eucharist in this series met with dissent in two key places: the use of 'offer' in relation to the bread and wine in the eucharistic prayer and the provision of prayers for the dead. It took until 1967 for General Synod to agree to a shape for the service. But in 1969 the whole of Series 2 was to disappear into obscurity following a dispute between the Houses of Laity and Clergy over the funeral service. At the same time that Series 1 and 2 were going through General Synod there was a growing shift in the English speaking world away from the use of Tudor language in worship. The use of modern English – and addressing God as 'you' – gave birth to a further version of the Eucharist which would be called Series 3. The International Consultation on English Texts (ICET) produced some recommended common texts for English speaking Christians. Unlike Series 1 and 2 which had a shape based on the BCP the series 3 communion service followed the shape that many today would recognise. Its first presentation to General Synod in 1971 led to severe criticism but after some minor revisions it was approved the following year. Although the BCP remained the norm in many parishes a high proportion were being prepared for a new series of services where God was addressed as 'you' all the way throughout.

==== Alternative Service Book ====
The time limits introduced in 1966 hampered the usefulness of the new services. Many were produced in chap booklet forms. But the Church of England (Worship and Doctrine) Measure 1974 permitted General Synod to provide by canon the unlimited use of alternative services. In 1976 a working party was set up to bring all of the various series three booklets including that for the Eucharist together into a single volume of reasonable This work was completed by the end of 1979 and the volume was authorised by synod the following year. Initially this was for 10 years but in 1990 this was extended for a further 10 years. The Alternative Service Book 1980 (ASB) had two communion services – Rite A and Rite B. Rite B was based on Series 1 in as far as it was based on the shape of the BCP service and was in traditional language. Rite A was based on the Series 3 communion service and the majority of the volume was written in contemporary language in recognition that English over the centuries since the BCP was produced had changed in meaning and usage. The order for Rite A is as follows:

- The preparation: a greeting, the collect of purity and the penitential rite.
- Kyrie Elesion or Gloria in Excelsis depending on the season.
- Ministry of the Word: scriptural readings, a psalm (often not used), sermon and creed.
- Prayers of intercession and an alternative place for the penitential rite if needed.
- Sharing of The peace
- Ministry of the Sacrament including the offertory and the use of one of four eucharistic prayers to consecrate the bread and wine. The shape of which were as outlined above including prayer 4 which was version of the BCP prayer in modern English.
- The provision for the use of hymns and other sacred music

There was also an order of service for parishes who wished to have a service in modern English but still keep the shape of that found in the BCP. This prayer book proved to be successful with it being taken up by the majority of parishes with rite A being the most popular of the two. But work did not stop here. There was a distinctive language shift which included the use of inclusive language as outlined in the report Making Women Visible (1988) but which was only adopted when the revised text for Common Worship was compiled. Seasonal material was produced. Firstly in 1986 was Lent, Holy Week and Easter which was followed in 1992 by The Promise of His Glory which contained a series of material for use between All Saints and Candlemas.

=== Common Worship ===
Common Worship is the name given to the library of volumes that replaced the Alternative Service Book 1980. In 1994 the Liturgical Commission suggested to General Synod that it was better to produce a series of separate texts rather than to squeeze everything into one volume. This reflected the findings of the Faith in the City report published in 1985 which identified that to give people a volume of 1300 pages was a symptom of the gulf between church and ordinary people. Ease of handling was the aim of producing the new worship material. This was available in separate booklets, congregational cards, downloadable files and also part of Visual Liturgy Service composing programme. The main volumes for the Eucharist are

- Common Worship: Services and Prayers for the Church of England: The main or core volume from which congregational worship is drawn
- Common Worship: President's Edition which is used from where the service is lead
- Common Worship: Times and Seasons bringing together season material.

Parishes were able to draw upon the core material to produce user friendly booklets to match the season and their local situation. Within Common Worship as in the ASB there are two orders of service - Order 1 and Order 2. Order 1 is a gentle revision of Rite A found in the ASB. The shape of the service was on the whole kept unchanged but the compilers of Common Worship were able to draw upon experience of post-ASB seasonal material as well as changes to worship occurring in other denominations. Major changes to the text took place to ensure that inclusive language was used as well as giving a much wider choice of text. The rite was available in both modern and traditional language as was that in Order 2.

The shape of Order 1 is as follows:

Introduction

- The people and the priest greet each other in the Lord's name
- Confess their sins. This is the only place it can now happen
- Gloria unless in the penitential seasons
- Collect of the day

The Word

- At least two readings including the Gospel
- A sermon
- The creed or some other profession of faith

Prayers of intercession

The Meal

- Sharing of the peace
- Receiving of offerings
- Consecration of bread and wine
- Receiving of communion

Ending departing with God's blessing

Order 2 has a more prayer book feel to the service.

Introduction

- The people and priest prepare for worship by hearing and responding to the commandments
- Pray a collect

The word

- At least two readings
- A sermon
- A profession of faith

The Prayers

- Prepare the table
- Pray for the church and world
- Confess their sins

The Meal

Praise God for his goodness

- Consecrate the bread and wine
- Receive communion
- Respond with thanksgiving

Ending by departing with God's blessing

Each order can draw on one of eight communion prayers

Prayers A to C were drawn from those that had been in rite A of the ASB with some revisions Prayer D is responsorial in nature and good for all age worship Prayer E is the shortest and has some of the flavour of prayer A Prayer F is responsorial and has its origins in the Eastern Christian tradition Prayer G is a redraft of a prayer produced by the Roman Catholic Church Prayer H is a dialogue between the priest and the people which ends with sanctus as an offering of praise

However, Common Worship does not end there as the material that is now available for the Eucharist is considerable. It includes

- Two versions of the summary of the law
- Two versions of the commandments
- The Beatitudes
- Two versions of the comfortable words
- Four invitations to Confession
- Six Confessions
- Two Absolution
- Seven Gospel Acclamations
- Four prayers after communion
- Seven authorised affirmations of faith as well as the Nicene and Apostles' Creed
- Fifteen sets of seasonal provisions

This allows churches to have a lot more variety within their worship as well as to mark the seasons in a meaningful way. The most common way of presenting the material is through service booklets to make it user friendly rather than presenting the whole volume.

== Customary of the rite ==
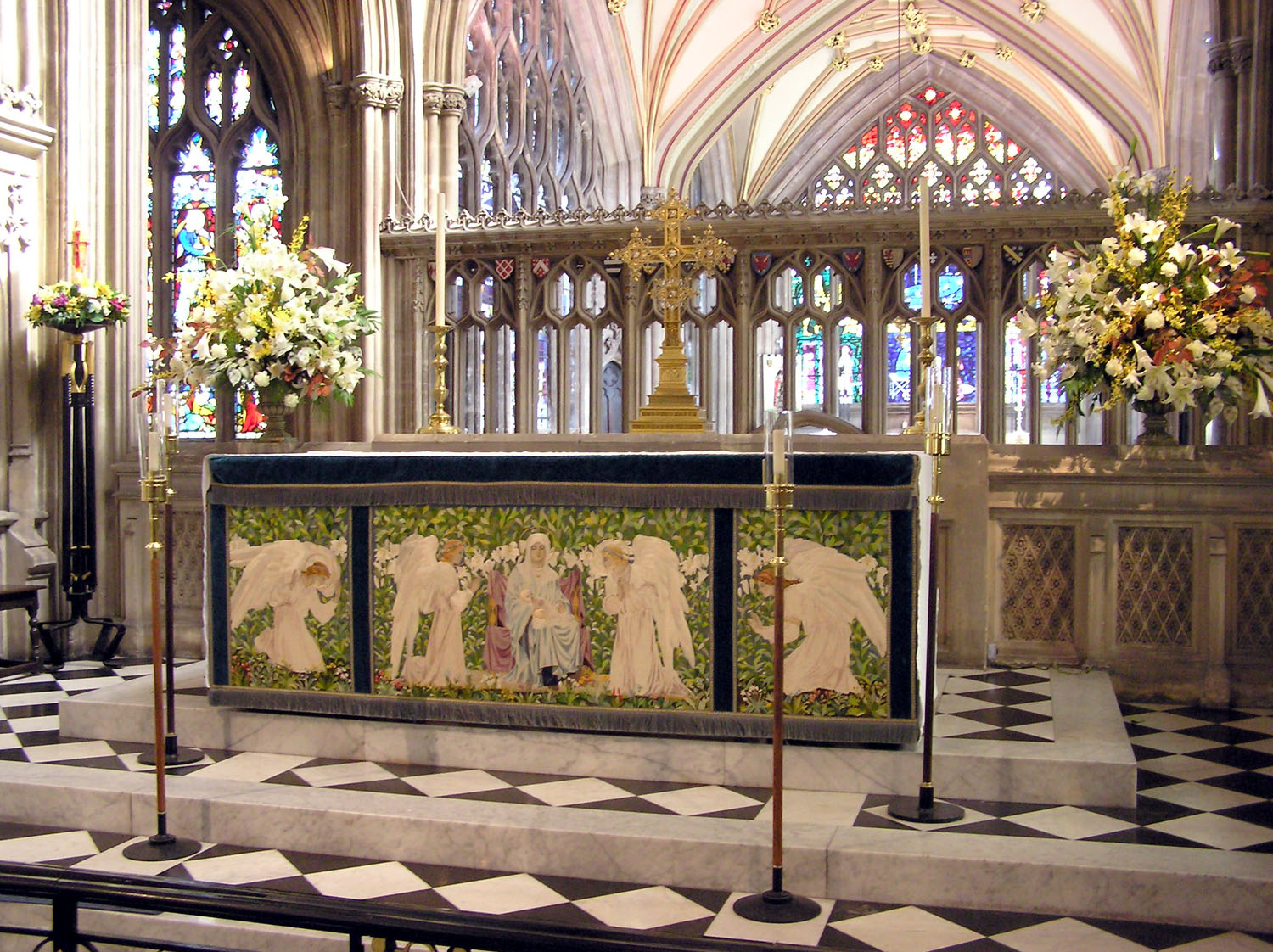
Typical style of an Anglican communion table. St Mary Redcliffe, Bristol, England.

The rubrics of a given prayer book outline the parameters of acceptable practice with regard to ritual, vestments, ornaments and method and means of distribution of the sacrament. The communal piety of a given parish or diocese will determine the expression of these rubrics and the implicit eucharist theology.

Until the latter part of the 19th century, the so-called "Ornaments Rubric" of the 1662 Prayer Book was interpreted to inhibit much of the ceremonial contemporary Anglicans take for granted. Priests were directed to stand at the north side or north end of the communion table and candles on the communion table were considered forbidden, as was the wearing of a chasuble or maniple. The Ritualist controversies of the late 19th century solidified the ascendancy of the Oxford Movement in the United Kingdom and many other parts of the Anglican Communion, re-introducing a much greater diversity of practice.

=== Low church ===
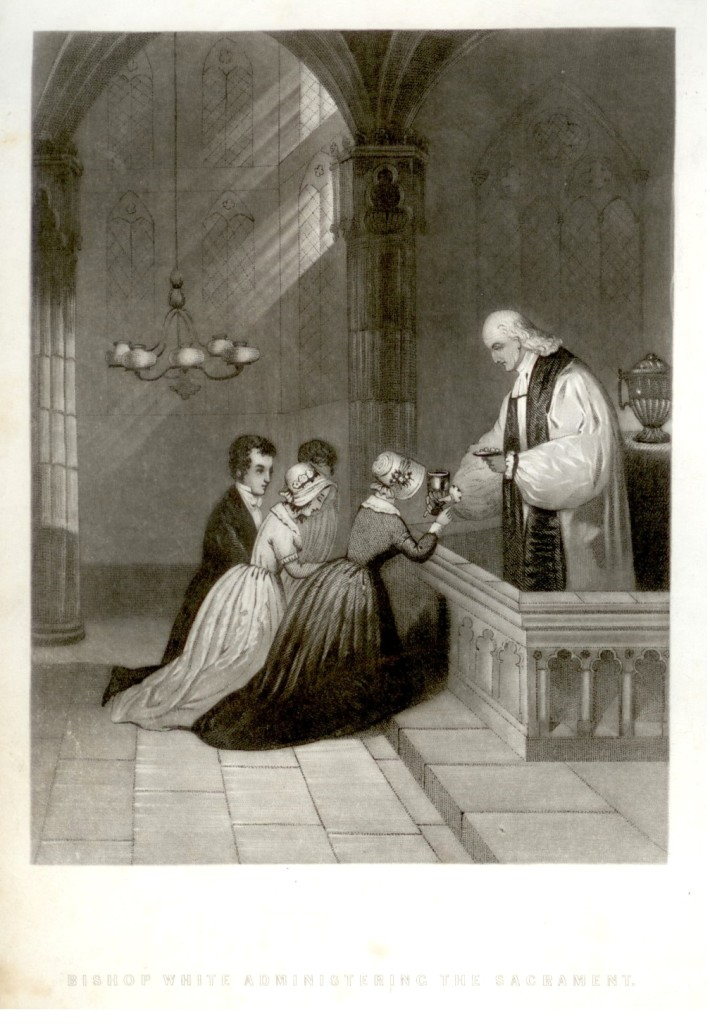
Bishop William White celebrating communion in choir dress in the 19th century. Such practice remains typical of low-church clergy, who object to the use of sacramental vestments.

In low-church parishes ceremonial is generally kept at a minimum, according to the rubrics of historical Anglican prayer books. The service is more often termed 'Holy Communion' than 'The Eucharist'. The priest is typically attired simply in a cassock, surplice, and a black scarf (called a tippet). This is a priest's "choir habit" as worn at a service of the word, but may also be worn as eucharistic vestments as was commonly done in earlier years. In some provinces, as boundaries become blurred, identifying low-church tradition by vesture alone is becoming more difficult. Many parishes that have a more charismatic flavour have generally abandoned the use of robes at most of their services, and their services are similar to that found in Pentecostal churches. However, even this is not universal and will depend on parish tradition, with some being vested for special occasions and the Eucharist if it is celebrated less frequently, or if it is part of confirmation. In some low-church parishes the minister may replace the black preaching scarf with a stole reflecting the colour of the season.

Manual action is kept to the standards of the rubrics found in the Book of Common Prayer (often confined to placing one's hands on the elements during the words of institution). The altar is referred to as the "Lord's table", the "holy table", or simply the "table". Candles are either absent or two in number. The material on the table may be limited to the chalice and paten, a cloth covering and, in some instances, the prayer book. The celebration of Holy Communion may be weekly or monthly. This frequency is in keeping with the Anglican practice that predominated prior to the 20th century. After the service, and following historical rubrics, the unconsumed bread and wine are reverently eaten by the priest and other ministers. If there is more than the clergy can finish, lay persons are called to help eat the remaining elements. In accordance with the Articles of Religion, the remaining bread and wine are not reserved in a tabernacle or aumbry. In some parishes, the president stands at the north-side of the holy table to read the service, in accordance with some interpretations of the rubrics of the 1662 Book of Common Prayer.

=== Broad church ===
In most broad-church parishes there is slightly more elaboration. In most parishes of the Anglican Communion, the Eucharist is celebrated every Sunday, having replaced Morning Prayer as the principal service. Broad-church Anglicans typically celebrate the Eucharist every Sunday, or at least most Sundays. The rite may also be celebrated once or twice at other times during the week. The sacrament is often reserved in an aumbry or consumed. Broad-church Anglicans may not reverence the sacrament, as such, but will frequently bow when passing the altar. Attending the Eucharist at a broad-church parish nowadays is likely to be similar in many respects to a contemporary Roman Catholic Mass. Priests will generally be vested in an alb and stole and also, in many instances, a chasuble. They may make use of a lavabo in preparation for the celebration, and the chalice and paten may be initially concealed by a burse and ornamental veil. Candles will almost always be present on the altar.

The rites for the Eucharist are found in the various prayer books of the Anglican churches. Wine and unleavened wafers or unleavened bread is used. Daily celebrations are the norm in many cathedrals and parish churches sometimes offer one or more services of Holy Communion during the week. The nature of the liturgy varies according to the theological tradition of the priests, parishes, dioceses and regional churches.

Reception of the Blessed Sacrament in the Anglican Communion and other Anglican jurisdictions varies by province. Formerly, Confirmation was generally required as a precondition to reception, but many provinces now allow all the baptized to partake as long as they are in good standing with the Church and have previously received First Communion.

=== Anglo-Catholic ===
Anglo-Catholic worship involves further elaboration. The priest will often be joined by a deacon and often a reader (the deacon being ordained in Holy Orders). A Reader is a lay person authorised to lead worship and preach, who will also be found in low-church and broad-church traditions as well. The former will be dressed in the historic eucharistic vestments specific to their office (chasuble, dalmatic and tunicle, respectively). They will sometimes wear maniples and ornamented amices. The Reader will always wear cassock, surplice and blue scarf as laid down by canon. In many churches the altar will be fixed against the "east wall" and the sacred ministers will celebrate Mass facing the tabernacle (often surmounted by a crucifix) above the altar, i.e., the sacred ministers and the congregation will all be facing the same direction. Apart from the tabernacle (containing the reserved sacrament) the altar is often adorned with six candles. Incense and sanctus bells are often used during the liturgy and the Eucharist itself is often supplemented by a number of prayers from earlier liturgies prayed by the priest, sacred ministers, and servers and sometimes the people as well.

Anglo-Catholic eucharistic theology places an emphasis on frequent communion, ideally daily. The unconsumed elements are typically reserved in a tabernacle or aumbry safe, either attached to a fixed altar or placed behind or to one side of a free-standing altar. Reserved sacrament is often used when visiting the sick or housebound, as well as in ministry to the dying. When the sacrament is present, Anglo-Catholics will often genuflect when passing in front of it. When absent they will bow to the altar. Often an aumbry is dignified in the same way. Many Anglo-Catholics practice eucharistic adoration and Benediction of the Blessed Sacrament, either informally or through a corporate liturgical rite.

Individuals will genuflect or bow in the presence of the Blessed Sacrament, which may be reserved in a tabernacle or aumbry on, behind, or near the altar. Its presence is usually indicated by a lamp suspended over or placed near the tabernacle or aumbry. Except among Anglo-Catholics, the use of a monstrance is rare. This is in keeping with the Article XXV of the Thirty-Nine Articles that "the Sacraments were not ordained of Christ to be gazed upon, or to be carried about, but that we should duly use Them." Nonetheless, many parishes do have services of, in which a ciborium is removed from the tabernacle or aumbry and hymns, prayers, psalms, and sentences of devotion are sung or read. In some parishes, when the Blessed Sacrament is moved from the tabernacle (from a high altar to a chapel altar, for instance), sanctus bells are rung and all who are present kneel.

== Administration ==
While the matter is always bread and wine, there is some variation. The bread may be in the form of individual wafers or an actual loaf from which pieces are torn off and distributed. Wine is typically red, but may be white. In some instances, fortified wine, such as sherry or port wine, is used. In still others, the option of juice is offered, usually in consideration of recipients who may be alcoholic (although it is considered acceptable and valid to receive the sacrament in only in one kind, i.e., the bread, pace the rubrics of the 1662 Book of Common Prayer).

The manner of administration varies. Many Anglican parishes retain the use of an altar rail, separating the area around the altar from the rest of the church. This practice is meant to convey the sanctity associated with the altar. In such churches, those who wish to receive communion will come forward and kneel at the altar rail, sometimes making the sign of the cross and cupping their hands (right over left) to receive the bread, then crossing themselves again to receive the chalice. Anglo-Catholics are often careful not to chew the bread (hence the overwhelming use of wafers in these parishes) or touch the chalice. Some prefer to have the bread placed directly on their tongue. In other parishes recipients stand before the administrators to receive Communion, while in still others participants may pass the sacrament from one to the next, often standing in a circle around the altar. The practice of using individual cups and handing out individual wafers or pieces of bread to be consumed simultaneously by the whole congregation is extremely uncommon in Anglicanism, but not unheard of.

Anglican practice is that those who administer the sacrament must be licensed by the diocesan bishop. Traditionally, priests and deacons were the only ministers authorised to administer; however, many provinces now permit the licensing of lay administrants.

The question of who may receive communion likewise varies. In historic Anglican practice, the altar was "fenced" from those whose manner of living was considered to be unrepentantly sinful. As parishes grew and the private lives of individuals became less accessible to public knowledge, this practice receded — although priests will, on occasion, refuse to admit to communion those whom they know to be actively engaged in notoriously sinful behaviour, such as criminal activity. Most Anglican provinces keep an "open table", meaning that all baptised Christians are welcome to receive communion. In many others, access to the sacrament is reserved for those who have been both baptised and confirmed, either in the Anglican or another tradition. Those who are ineligible or do not wish to receive are frequently encouraged to come forward and cross their arms to form a sign of the cross to indicate that they wish to receive a blessing.

== Reservation, consumption, disposal ==
A rubric following the Order of Holy Communion in the 1662 Book of Common Prayer instructs that any remaining bread and wine should be consumed as soon as the service concludes:

And if any of the Bread and Wine remain unconsecrated, the Curate shall have it to his own use: but if any remain of that which was consecrated, it shall not be carried out of the Church, but the Priest, and such other of the Communicants as he shall then call unto him, shall, immediately after the Blessing, reverently eat and drink the same.

In American Prayer Books (until 1979), the rubric read thus:

And if any of the consecrated Bread and Wine remain after the Communion, it shall not be carried out of the Church; but the Minister and other Communicants shall, immediately after the Blessing, reverently eat and drink the same.

Article XXVIII of the Articles of Religion states that, "The Sacrament of the Lord's Supper was not by Christ's ordinance reserved, carried about, lifted up, or worshipped." Edgar Gibson, the Bishop of Gloucester explains this article, writing that "The statement in the Article is worded with the utmost care, and with studied moderation. It cannot be said that any one of the practices is condemned or prohibited by it. It only amounts to this: that none of them can claim to be part of the original Divine institution." The Anglican priest Jonathan A. Mitchican rehashes this view, stating that Article XXVIII does not forbid the practice of reservation, but notes that it does not have an origin in Sacred Scripture.

As such, today, only a minority of Anglican dioceses do not authorize their individual churches to reserve the sacrament between services. In these churches, reverent consumption or disposal is often practiced. When disposed, the elements may be finely broken, poured over the earth or placed down a piscina in the sacristy—a sink with a pipe that leads underground to a pit or into the earth. What is done with the remaining elements is often reflective of churchmanship.

Where reservation is permissible parishes will place the sacrament (along with holy oils) in an aumbry - a cupboard inserted in the wall of the chancel. As mentioned above, Anglo-Catholic parishes believing in the corporeal presence of the blessed sacrament make use of a tabernacle or hanging pyx, with which is associated various acts of reverence and adoration.

== Ecumenical developments ==
In 1910, Raphael of Brooklyn, an Eastern Orthodox bishop, "sanctioned an interchange of ministrations with the Episcopalians in places where members of one or the other communion are without clergy of their own". Raphael stated that in places "where there is no resident Orthodox Priest", an Anglican priest could administer Marriage, Holy Baptism, and the Blessed Sacrament to an Orthodox layperson. In 1912, however, Raphael ended the intercommunion after becoming uncomfortable with the fact that the Anglican Communion contained different churchmanships within it, e.g. high church, Evangelical, etc.

Representatives of the Anglican and Roman Catholic churches have declared that they have reached "substantial agreement on the doctrine of the Eucharist" in the Windsor Statement on Eucharistic Doctrine developed by the Anglican-Roman Catholic International Commission, as well as the commission's Elucidation of the ARCIC Windsor Statement. In 1994, the Anglican–Roman Catholic Consultation in the United States of America released Five Affirmations on the Eucharist as Sacrifice, which stated

that Christ in the eucharist makes himself present sacramentally and truly when under the species of bread and wine these earthy realities are changed into the reality of his body and blood. In English the terms substance, substantial, and substantially have such physical and material overtones that we, adhering to The Final Report, have substituted the word truly for the word substantially ... ... in the light of these five affirmations [the Anglican–Roman Catholic Consultation in the United States of America] records its conclusions that the eucharist as sacrifice is not an issue that divides our two Churches.

This amounts to an acceptance of the doctrine, with an expression of a reservation about the use of the name of the doctrine in English because the word is misunderstood by English speakers.

However, the Catholic Church considers the Anglican sacraments to be invalid, as stated by Pope Leo XIII in Apostolicae curae and Pope John Paul II in Ad tuendam fidem.

== See also ==
- Christian Liturgy
- Black Rubric
- Transignification
