= Lord's Supper in Reformed theology =

Sacrament that spiritually nourishes Christians

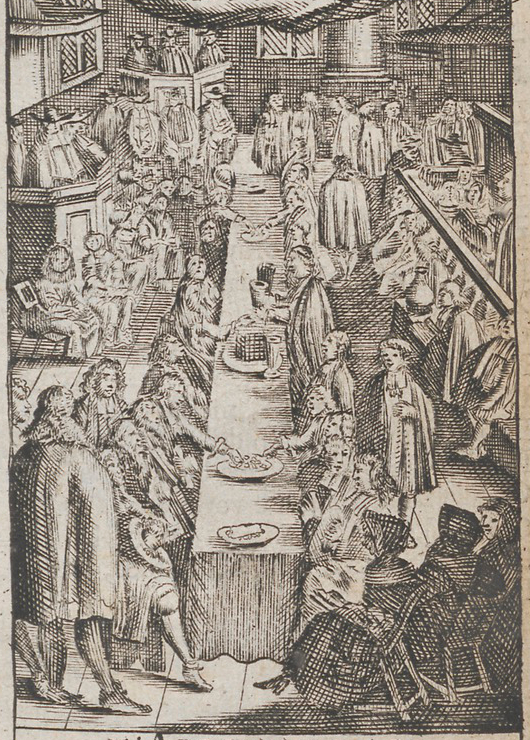
This image from the frontispiece of a book on the subject depicts a Dutch Reformed service of the Lord's Supper.

In Reformed theology, the Lord's Supper or Eucharist is a sacrament that spiritually nourishes Christians and strengthens their union with Christ. The outward or physical action of the sacrament is eating bread and drinking wine. Reformed confessions, which are official statements expressing the beliefs of Reformed churches, teach that Christ's body and blood are really present in the sacrament and that believers receive, in the words of the Belgic Confession, "the proper and natural body and the proper blood of Christ." The primary difference between the Reformed doctrine and that of Catholic and Lutheran Christians is that for the Reformed, this presence is believed to be communicated in a spiritual manner by faith rather than by oral consumption. The Reformed doctrine of real presence is called "pneumatic presence" (from pneuma, a Greek word for "spirit"; alternatively called "spiritual real presence" or "mystical real presence").

Early Reformed theologians such as John Calvin and Heinrich Bullinger taught that Christ's person, including his body and blood, are presented to Christians who partake of it in faith. This view of the real spiritual presence was formally formulated by both Calvin and Bullinger in the Consensus Tigurinus. The historic Reformed confessions of faith, including the Second Helvetic Confession (Continental Reformed), Westminster Confession (Presbyterian), Thirty-Nine Articles (Anglican), Confession of Faith of the Calvinistic Methodists of Wales (Calvinistic Methodist), and Savoy Declaration (Congregationalist), hold to the doctrine of real spiritual presence. Though non-Reformed, the Wesleyan Methodist Twenty-five Articles inherited the Reformed view from Anglicanism.

The Reformed view of a real spiritual presence stands in contrast to the Roman Catholic belief in transubstantiation, that the substances of bread and wine of the Eucharist physically change into Christ's body and blood, as well as the Lutheran doctrine of the Eucharist that is based on Martin Luther's teaching of Christ's body being received orally in the elements of bread and wine through a sacramental union.

Later Reformed orthodox theologians continued to teach the view held by Calvin and Bullinger—the 'real spiritual presence of Christ in the Eucharist'.

== History ==
=== Background ===
From the beginning of Christianity through the 10th century, Christian theologians saw the Eucharist as the church's participation in Christ's sacrifice. Christ was believed to be present in the Eucharist, but there were different views over the way in which this occurred.

Reformed theologian John Riggs has argued that the School of Antioch in the Eastern Roman Empire, along with Hilary of Poitiers and Ambrose in the Western Roman Empire, taught a realist, metabolic, or somatic view, where the elements of the Eucharist were believed to be changed into Christ's body and blood. Riggs maintains that the influential fourth-century Western theologian Augustine of Hippo, on the other hand, held that Christ is really present in the elements of the Eucharist but not in a bodily manner, because his body remains in heaven. Riggs argues that Augustine believed the Eucharist is a spiritual eating which allows Christians to become part of Christ's body. Western theologians in the three centuries following Augustine did not elaborate on the way Christ is present in the Eucharist but emphasized the transforming power of the sacrament.

According to Riggs, in the ninth century, Hrabanus Maurus and Ratramnus also defended Augustine's view of nonmetabolic real presence. During the high and late Middle Ages, the metabolic view became increasingly dominant to the exclusion of the nonmetabolic view, to the point that it was considered the only orthodox option. The doctrine of transubstantiation was developed in the high Middle Ages to explain the change of the elements into Christ's body and blood. Transubstantiation is the belief that the Eucharistic elements are transformed into Christ's body and blood in a way only perceivable by the intellect, not by the senses.

Anglican theologian Brian Douglas maintains that "Augustine is clear, nonetheless, in his use of realism and argues that the presence of Christ in the Eucharist is real such that the bread and wine and their offering participate in a real way in the eternal and heavenly Forms of Christ's body and blood."

Berengar of Tours had a view very similar to Calvin, and such views were common in the early Anglo-Saxon church, as can be seen in the writings of Aelfric of Eynsham.

=== Reformation ===
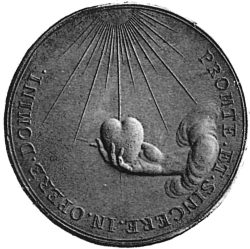
This seventeenth-century medal commemorating John Calvin depicts a hand holding a heart to heaven. Calvin believed Christians were lifted up to heaven by the Holy Spirit in the Lord's Supper.

Martin Luther, leading figure of the Reformation and leader of the Protestant movement which would be called Lutheranism, rejected the doctrine of transubstantiation. However, he continued to hold that Christ is bodily present "under the bread and wine" in a manner later Lutheran theology calls the Sacramental Union (to be distinguished from the Reformed union between "sign and thing signified"). Luther insisted that Christ's words during the institution of the sacrament, "this is my body", be taken literally. He believed that anyone who ate and drank during the Eucharist (often called the "Lord's Supper" by Protestants) truly ate Christ's body and drank his blood, regardless of their faith.

Huldrych Zwingli, the first theologian in the Reformed tradition, also rejected the view of transubstantiation, but he disagreed with Luther by holding that Christ is not bodily present in the Eucharistic elements themselves. He held that Christ's whole person (body and spirit) is presented to believers in the Eucharist, but that this does not occur by Christ's body being eaten with the mouth. This view has been labeled "mystical real presence", meaning that those who partake have a direct experience of God's presence, or "spiritual real presence" because Christ's presence is by his spirit. Zwingli also did not believe that the sacrament actually confers the grace which is offered in the sacrament but that the outer signs of bread and wine testify to that grace and awaken the memory of Christ's death. Zwingli's views on the Lord's Supper did not largely contribute to the shaping of the Reformed doctrine of the Eucharist (which are chiefly based on the Eucharistic theology of Calvin and Bullinger), though it was influential in the views of other non-Reformed traditions of Christianity, such as the Plymouth Brethren.

John Calvin, a very influential early Reformed theologian, believed the Lord's Supper fed Christians with the spiritual food of union with Christ. He believed that in the Supper Christians feed on Christ's flesh, which he saw as an inexplicable miracle. Calvin taught that the Supper confirms the promises communicated to Christians in the preaching of the Gospel. He also saw its purpose as provoking praise for God and love for other people. He believed it necessary for Christians to partake of Christ's humanity in the Supper as well as his Spirit, and that the bread and wine really present, rather than simply symbolize or represent, Christ's body and blood. Calvin spoke of the communication involved in the Lord's Supper as spiritual, meaning that it originates in the Holy Spirit. Calvin's teaching on the Lord's Supper was a development of that held by Martin Bucer and was held by other Reformed theologians such as Peter Martyr Vermigli. Calvin, like Zwingli and against Luther, did not believe that Christ is bodily present in the elements of the Eucharist. He taught that Christ remains in heaven and that people commune with him in the Lord's Supper by being raised up to him rather than his descending to them. Calvin believed the elements of the Supper to be used by God as instruments in communicating the promises which they represent, a view called symbolic instrumentalism.

Heinrich Bullinger, Zwingli's successor, went beyond Zwingli by teaching that there is a union between the sacrament of the Supper and the grace symbolized in it. Bullinger's view was not identical to Calvin's because he did not see sacraments as instrumental in communicating grace. Bullinger's view has been called "symbolic parallelism" because the inward feeding on Christ occurs at the same time as the outward eating of bread and wine but is not caused by it in any way.

Thomas Cranmer, the architect of the English Reformation and guiding figure who shaped Anglican doctrine, aligned himself with the Eucharistic theology of John Calvin, which is reflected in the 28th Article of the Thirty-Nine Articles of the Church of England: "the Body of Christ is given, taken, and eaten, in the Supper, only after an heavently and spiritual manner."

John Knox, the leader of the Scottish Reformation and father of Presbyterianism, emphasized that in the Lord's Supper, believers are lifted "up to Christ in a spiritual feeding upon his body and blood". His beliefs of the Lord's Supper aligned with those of John Calvin. Suzanne McDonald, a professor of systematic and historical theology at Western Theological Seminary, summarizes John Knox's theology: "That spiritual feeding on Christ, through union with him in his ascended humanity by the Spirit, is held out for us as we eat and drink the bread and wine."

The Reformed confessions of faith, official statements of the beliefs of Reformed churches, followed the view that Christ is really present in the Supper. These include the Second Helvetic Confession (Continental Reformed), Westminster Confession (Presbyterian), Thirty-Nine Articles (Anglican), and Savoy Declaration (Congregationalist). They took either Calvin's view that the signs of bread and wine are instrumental in communicating grace, or Bullinger's of symbolic parallelism—both of which fall under the category of a "real spiritual presence of Christ in the Eucharist". Some of the German-language Reformed confessions seem hesitant to make the sacrament a means of grace, but they all maintain that there is a union between the outward signs of the sacrament and the inward grace signified. Reformed orthodox theologians also continued to insist on Christ's real presence in the Supper, while denying the Lutheran position that his body is substantially present in the elements.

=== Modern opinions of various theologians ===
The influential 18th century Reformed theologian Friedrich Schleiermacher saw problems with all the Reformation positions on Christ's presence in the Eucharist and hoped that a new articulation of the doctrine would be made. He emphasized the function of the Supper of confirming Christians' union with Christ as well as the union they have with one another.

In the 19th century the doctrine of the Lord's Supper became a point of controversy between American Reformed theologians John Williamson Nevin and Charles Hodge. Nevin, influenced by German Lutheran Isaak August Dorner, wrote that through the Lord's Supper, Christians are mystically united to Christ's whole person and that this union is through Christ's flesh. Hodge thought that Nevin overemphasized the idea of mystical union and argued that when Christians are said to commune with Christ in the Supper, it is Christ's virtue as a sacrifice for their sins which is meant rather than a mystical union with his flesh. Hodge also taught that nothing is communicated in the Lord's Supper which is not communicated in the preaching of God's word. American Presbyterians generally agreed with Hodge.

Twentieth-century Reformed theologian Karl Barth did not follow the Reformed belief that sacraments are used by God as means of grace. Instead, he saw the Lord's Supper as purely symbolic and functioning to proclaim God's promises. His position has been called symbolic memorialism because he saw the sacraments function as memorializing Christ's death. Donald Baillie took a position similar to that of John Calvin, arguing that though God is omnipresent, he is present in a special way in the Lord's Supper because he is present by virtue of the believer's faith. Christ's presence is even more real to the believer in the sacrament than is physical reality.

One 20th–21st century "development" has been the movement to retrieve reformational theology for contemporary use. Among the early advocates of this movement was W. Robert Godfrey, who sought to retrieve John Calvin's doctrine of the Lord's Supper that the body and blood of Christ are the food and drink of the Christian's soul. Summarizing Calvin, Godfrey said, "That body and blood are not just once and for all offered on the cross as a past and finished thing, but that body and blood, that real Christ, continue to be the life-giving spirit among us." Because of this theology of the Lord's Supper, Calvin advocated for communion "at least weekly" (Institutes of the Christian Religion, 4.17.43). From this, Godfrey wrote:

The frequency of administration may say something about what we expect to find at that table (or, maybe I should say, whom we expect to find at that table) and what the blessing of meeting Jesus Christ there really is.

Many of Godfrey's students at Westminster Seminary California have followed-up and advocated and practiced weekly communion on the basis of the theology of the Reformed confessions, in their congregations, first in the Christian Reformed Church in North America (CRCNA) and now in the United Reformed Churches in North America (URCNA): R. Scott Clark, Kim Riddlebarger, Michael Horton, and Daniel R. Hyde.

== Meaning ==
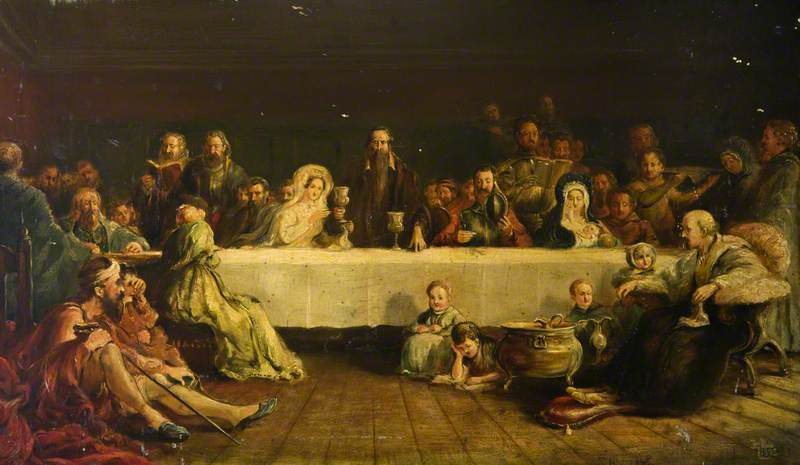
This painting depicts John Knox, a Scottish Reformed theologian and clergyman, administering the Lord's Supper.

In the Reformed confessions, the Lord's Supper is a meal that provides spiritual nourishment. Eating the body and drinking the blood of Christ in the sacrament is believed to spiritually strengthen Christians. Believers are already believed to be united with Christ, but the Supper serves to deepen and strengthen this union. The Supper is also a way to commemorate and proclaim the death and resurrection of Christ. Partakers are to express gratitude and praise to God in thanks for his death and the benefits it provides. The Supper is believed to assure Christians of their salvation and union with Christ, which has been communicated to them in the preaching of the gospel. The Supper is also believed to enhance Christians' union with one another. It calls Christians to love and obey Christ and to live in harmony with other Christians.

Reformed confessions reject the Catholic doctrine that the Eucharist is a sacrifice of propitiation, or sacrifice to satisfy God's wrath and attain forgiveness of sins. Instead, they teach that Christ's body is only to be received, not re-presented to God as a sacrifice. The confessions do sometimes speak of the Supper as a sacrifice of thanksgiving for the gift of propitiation which has been received. In the 20th century, Scottish Reformed theologian T. F. Torrance developed a strong doctrine of Eucharistic sacrifice. He argued that Christ's person and work could not be separated and that the Eucharist mediated his sacrificial death.

In Reformed churches, only believing Christians are expected to partake of the Lord's Supper. Further, partakers are expected to examine and prepare themselves for the sacrament. This involves determining whether one acknowledges their sinfulness and has faith in Christ to forgive them. Christians may have some degree of doubt regarding their salvation, but they are at least to be aware of their sin and have a desire to have faith.

== Christ's presence ==
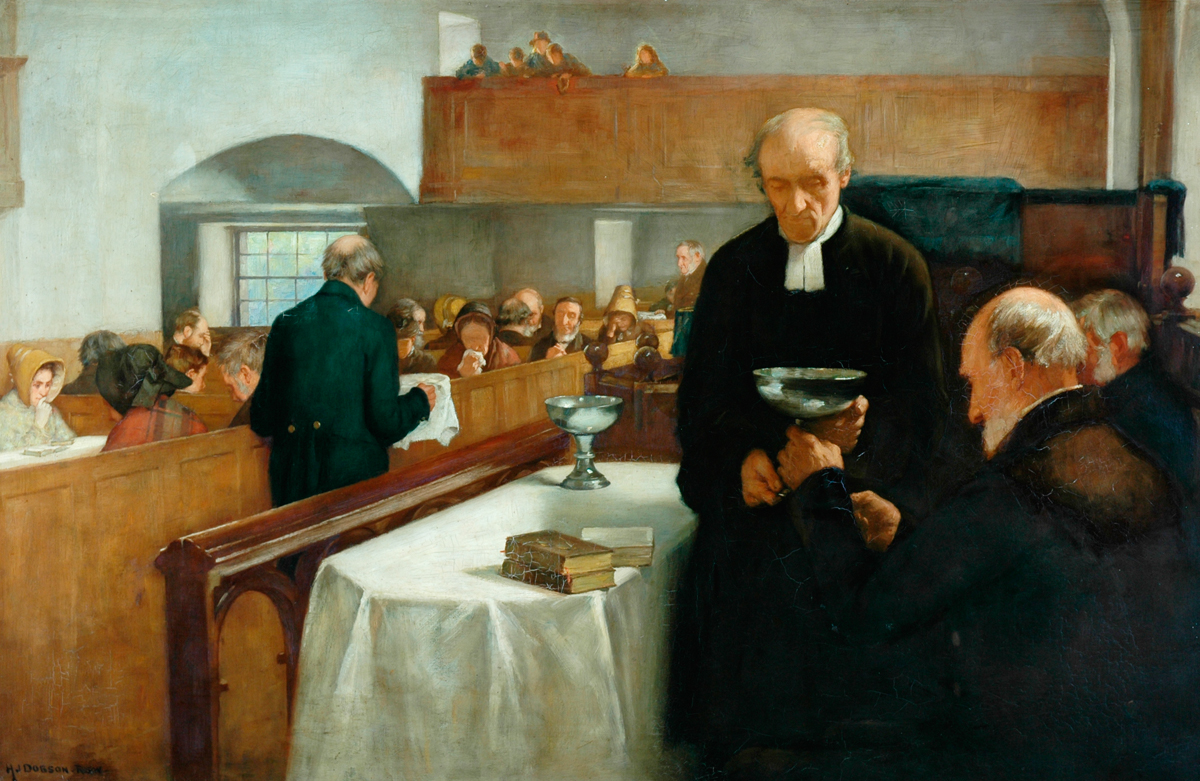
A Scottish Sacrament, by Henry John Dobson

The Reformed confessions teach that Christ's true body and blood are really present in the Lord's Supper. Regarding what is received in the Supper, the Reformed tradition does not disagree with the position of Catholicism or Lutheranism. Reformed confessions teach that partakers of the Supper, in the words of the Belgic Confession, partake of "the proper and natural body and the proper blood of Christ". However, they deny the explanations for this eating and drinking made by Lutherans and Catholics.

Reformed confessions teach that the bread and wine of the Supper do not become the blood and body of Christ, as in the Catholic view of transubstantiation. Against Lutherans, Reformed confessions do not teach that partakers of the Supper eat Christ's body and drink his blood with their mouths (Latin: manducatio oralis). While Reformed confessions teach that in the Supper Christ is received in both his divine and human natures, the manner of eating is believed to be spiritual (manducatio spiritualis). The body and blood of Christ remain fleshly substance, but they are communicated to the partaker in a spiritual manner.

== See also ==
- Anglican eucharistic theology
- Receptionism
- Reformed baptismal theology

== Bibliography ==
- Ayres, Lewis; Humphries, Thomas (2015). "Augustine and the West to ad 650". In Boersma, Hans; Levering, Matthew (eds.). Oxford Handbook of Sacramental Theology. Oxford: Oxford University Press. pp. 156–169. doi:10.1093/oxfordhb/9780199659067.013.6. ISBN 978-0-19-965906-7.
- Douglas, Brian (2011). A Companion to Anglican Eucharistic Theology: Volume 1: The Reformation to the 19th Century. Brill. ISBN 978-90-04-22132-1.
- Gerrish, B. A. (July 1966). "The Lord's Supper in the Reformed Confessions". Theology Today. 23 (2): 224–243. doi:10.1177/004057366602300208.
- Gerrish, Brian (11 November 2004). The Old Protestantism and the New. A&C Black. ISBN 978-0-567-08048-6.
- Holifield, E. Brooks (2015). "Sacramental Theology in America: Seventeenth–Nineteenth Centuries". In Boersma, Hans; Levering, Matthew (eds.). Oxford Handbook of Sacramental Theology. Oxford: Oxford University Press. pp. 380–395. doi:10.1093/oxfordhb/9780199659067.013.24. ISBN 978-0-19-965906-7.
- Horton, Michael S. (2008). People and Place: A Covenant Ecclesiology. Louisville, KY: Westminster John Knox. ISBN 978-0-664-23071-5.
- Hunsinger, George (2015). "The Lord's Supper in Twentieth-Century and Contemporary Protestant Theology". In Boersma, Hans; Levering, Matthew (eds.). Oxford Handbook of Sacramental Theology. Oxford: Oxford University Press. pp. 410–416. doi:10.1093/oxfordhb/9780199659067.013.4. ISBN 978-0-19-965906-7.
- Hyde, Daniel R. "Why We Celebrate Weekly Communion." Oceanside United Reformed Church (2005, 2026).
- Kilmartin, Edward J. (22 September 2015). The Eucharist in the West: History and Theology. Liturgical Press. ISBN 978-0-8146-6340-0.
- Letham, Robert (2001). The Lord's Supper: Eternal Word in Broken Bread. Phillipsburg, New Jersey: P&R. ISBN 978-0-87552-202-9.
- Levy, Ian Christopher (2015). "The Eucharist in the Fourteenth and Fifteenth Centuries". In Boursma, Hans; Levering, Matthew (eds.). The Oxford Handbook of Sacramental Theology. Oxford: Oxford University Press. doi:10.1093/oxfordhb/9780199659067.013.1. ISBN 978-0-19-965906-7.
- Mentzer, Raymond A. (2013). "Reformed Liturgical Practices". In Wandel, Lee Palmer (ed.). A Companion to the Eucharist in the Reformation. Brill's Companions to the Christian Tradition. Vol. 46. Leiden, The Netherlands: Brill. pp. 231–250. doi:10.1163/9789004260177_013. ISBN 978-90-04-26017-7.
- Opitz, Peter (2016). "Huldrych Zwingli". In Nimmo, Paul T.; Fergusson, David A. S. (eds.). The Cambridge Companion to Reformed Theology. New York: Cambridge University Press. ISBN 978-1-107-02722-0.
- Riggs, John (2015). The Lord's Supper in the Reformed Tradition. Louisville, Kentucky: Westminster John Knox. ISBN 978-0-664-26019-4.
- Rohls, Jan (1998) [1987]. Theologie reformierter Bekenntnisschriften [Reformed Confessions: Theology from Zurich to Barmen] (in German). Translated by John Hoffmeyer. Louisville, Kentucky: Westminster John Knox. ISBN 0-664-22078-9.
- Swain, Scott R. (2015). "Lutheran and Reformed Sacramental Theology: Seventeenth–Nineteenth Centuries". In Boursma, Hans; Levering, Matthew (eds.). The Oxford Handbook of Sacramental Theology. Oxford: Oxford University Press. doi:10.1093/oxfordhb/9780199659067.013.16. ISBN 978-0-19-965906-7.
- Venema, Cornelius P. (2001). "The Doctrine of the Lord's Supper in the Reformed Confessions" (PDF). Mid-America Theological Journal. 12: 135–199.
- Yelton, Jeff (2019). Wine in the Lord's Supper: in which it is proved from the Holy Scriptures and plain reason that true wine, the fermented juice of grapes, should be used in the sacrament.
