= Receptionism =

Form of Anglican eucharistic theology

Receptionism is a form of Anglican eucharistic theology which teaches that during the Eucharist the bread and wine remain unchanged after the consecration, but when communicants receive the bread and wine, they also receive the body and blood of Christ by faith. It was a common view among Anglicans in the 16th and 17th centuries, and prominent theologians who subscribed to this doctrine were Thomas Cranmer and Richard Hooker. Receptionism is a form of the Reformed doctrine of the real spiritual presence formulated by John Calvin and Heinrich Bullinger. Methodism inherited the Reformed Anglican doctrine of receptionism.

== Anglicanism ==
Anglican theologian Claude B. Moss defines receptionism as "the theory that we receive the Body and Blood of Christ when we receive the bread and wine, but they are not identified with the bread and wine which are not changed". It teaches that "the sacramental gift is received by faith", but it has often been misunderstood or misrepresented as teaching that "faith creates the sacrament".

The term itself seems not to have appeared before 1867, but the teaching has roots going back to the English Reformation, particularly to the theology of Thomas Cranmer, the guiding figure of the Protestant Reformation in England; Thomas Cranmer aligned himself with the Eucharistic theology of John Calvin, which is reflected in the 28th Article of the Thirty-Nine Articles of the Church of England: "the Body of Christ is given, taken, and eaten, in the Supper, only after an heavenly and spiritual manner." This view is the real spiritual presence (pneumatic presence) and is held by denominations of the Reformed (Continental Reformed, Presbyterian, Congregationalist, and Reformed Anglican) tradition.

It is clear that, in rejecting Roman Catholic doctrine on this point, Cranmer has also rejected Luther's views and adopted Calvin's position. The sacrament is not merely a symbol of what takes place in the heart, but neither is it the physical eating of the body of Christ. This must be so, because the body of Christ is in heaven and therefore our participation in it can only be spiritual. Only the believers are the true partakers of the body and blood of Christ, for the unbelievers eat and drink no more than bread and wine—and condemnation upon themseves, for the profanation of the Lord's Table. These views are reflected in the Thirty-nine articles, of which the twenty-eighth says that "the Body of the Christ is given, taken, and eaten, in the Supper, only after an heavently and spiritual manner. The next article says of the wicked that "in no wise are they partakers of Christ," although "to their condemnation [they] do eat and rink the sign or Sacrament of so great a thing." This marked Calvinistic influence would prove very significant for the history of Christianity in England during the seventeenth century… —Justo L. González

Scholars such as MacCulloch, Bates and Beckwith & Tiller class it as "receptionism". In describing Cranmer's changes to the communion service in the 1552 Book of Common Prayer, Colin Buchanan writes, "the only 'moment' is reception—and the only point where the bread and wine signify the body and blood is at reception", when the communicants remembered Christ's offering of himself on the cross.

It was also held in some form by Richard Hooker. According to him, the bread is unchanged at the blessing of the priest, but becomes an effectual spiritual sign when received by someone in faith.

This Eucharistic teaching was commonly held by 16th and 17th-century Anglican theologians. It was characteristic of 17th century thought to "insist on the real presence of Christ in the Eucharist, but to profess agnosticism concerning the manner of the presence ..." It remained "the dominant theological position in the Church of England until the Oxford Movement in the early nineteenth century, with varying degrees of emphasis". It is important to remember that it is "a doctrine of the real presence" but one which "relates the presence primarily to the worthy receiver rather than to the elements of bread and wine".

Receptionism rules out the practice of Eucharistic adoration, a practice that in any case most Protestants reject as unscriptural.

== Methodism ==
The Twenty-five Articles of Religion of Methodism inherited "Of the Lord’s Supper" from the Thirty-Nine Articles of Religion of Anglicanism:

The Supper of the Lord is not only a sign of the love that Christians ought to have among themselves one to another, but rather is a sacrament of our redemption by Christ’s death; insomuch that, to such as rightly, worthily, and with faith receive the same, the bread which we break is a partaking of the body of Christ; and likewise the cup of blessing is a partaking of the blood of Christ. Transubstantiation, or the change of the substance of bread and wine in the Supper of our Lord, cannot be proved by Holy Writ, but is repugnant to the plain words of Scripture, overthroweth the nature of a sacrament, and hath given occasion to many superstitions. The body of Christ is given, taken, and eaten in the Supper, only after a heavenly and spiritual manner. And the mean whereby the body of Christ is received and eaten in the Supper is faith. The Sacrament of the Lord’s Supper was not by Christ’s ordinance reserved, carried about, lifted up, or worshiped.

The Reformed theology of receptionism, or the real spiritual presence, is the view held by Methodists "and is well presented in the Holy Communion hymns of Charles Wesley."

== Rejection of Receptionism ==
The Roman Catholic and Lutheran traditions of Christianity reject the doctrine of receptionism as both denominations teach a corporeal presence of Christ in the Eucharist.

=== Catholic Church ===
The 16th-century Council of Trent condemned this teaching, declaring that "if any one saith, that, after the consecration is completed, the body and blood of our Lord Jesus Christ are not in the admirable sacrament of the Eucharist, but (are there) only during the use, whilst it is being taken, and not either before or after; and that, in the hosts, or consecrated particles, which are reserved or which remain after communion, the true Body of the Lord remaineth not; let him be anathema".

The Catholic Church's rejection of receptionism was reaffirmed by Pope Paul VI in his papal encyclical Mysterium fidei of 3 September 1965. Citing Origen, Hippolytus of Rome, Novatian and Cyril of Alexandria, he stated: "The Catholic Church has always displayed and still displays this latria that ought to be paid to the Sacrament of the Eucharist, both during Mass and outside of it, by taking the greatest possible care of consecrated Hosts, by exposing them to the solemn veneration of the faithful, and by carrying them about in processions to the joy of great numbers of the people."

=== Lutheran Churches ===
The position regarding the real presence of Christ in the Eucharist in Lutheranism is the sacramental union: the consecrated bread is united with the body of Christ and the consecrated wine is united with the blood of Christ by virtue of Christ's original institution with the result that anyone eating and drinking these "elements"—the consecrated bread and wine—really eats and drinks the physical body and blood of Christ as well.
