= Twenty-five Articles =

Official doctrinal statement of Methodism

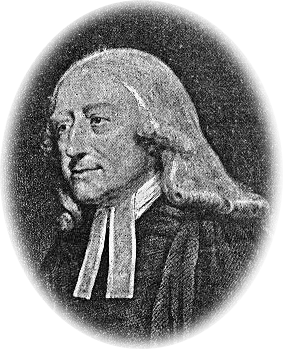
John Wesley

The Articles of Religion (also called the Twenty-five Articles of Religion or Twenty-five Articles) are an official doctrinal statement of Methodism—particularly American Methodism and its offshoots. John Wesley revised the Thirty-nine Articles of the Church of England, removing the Calvinistic parts among others, reflecting Wesley's Arminian theology. In particular, the article on original sin was truncated, in view of the core Wesleyan Methodist doctrine of entire sanctification.

The resulting Twenty-five Articles were adopted at the Christmas Conference of 1784, and are found in the Books of Discipline of Methodist Churches, such as Chapter I of the Doctrines and Discipline of the African Methodist Episcopal Church, ¶ 106 of the Book of Doctrines and Discipline of the Global Methodist Church, and paragraph 103 of the United Methodist Church Book of Discipline. They have remained relatively unchanged since 1808, save for a few additional articles added in later years in the Free Methodist Church, the United Methodist tradition and the Allegheny Wesleyan Methodist Connection, among other Methodist connexions.

== History ==
The Thirty-nine Articles of the Church of England were intended to establish, in basic terms, the faith and practice of the Church of England. While not designed to be a creed or complete statement of the Christian faith, the articles explain the Reformed doctrinal position of the Church of England in relation to Catholicism and Anabaptism.

Wesley revised the Articles in 1784 for the Methodist work in America. His twenty-four Articles reflect both his theological commitments and his desire for doctrinal clarity, shortening some articles and deleting others if they could be easily misread.

The Free Methodist Church added two articles, one on entire sanctification and another on "Future Rewards and Punishments".

The articles Of Sanctification, taken from the Methodist Protestant Church, and Of the Duty of Christians to the Civil Authority were added by the Uniting Conference that constituted the Methodist Church in 1939.

== Contents ==
Twenty-five Articles

1. Of Faith in the Holy Trinity.
2. Of the Word, or Son of God, Who Was Made Very Man.
3. Of the Resurrection of Christ.
4. Of the Holy Ghost.
5. Of the Sufficiency of the Holy Scriptures for Salvation.
6. Of the Old Testament.
7. Of Original or Birth Sin.
8. Of Free Will.
9. Of the Justification of Man.
10. Of Good Works.
11. Of Works of Supererogation.
12. Of Sin After Justification.
13. Of the Church.
14. Of Purgatory.
15. Of Speaking in the Congregation in Such a Tongue as the People Understand.
16. Of the Sacraments.
17. Of Baptism.
18. Of the Lord's Supper.
19. Of Both Kinds.
20. Of the One Oblation of Christ, Finished upon the Cross.
21. Of the Marriage of Ministers.
22. Of the Rites and Ceremonies of Churches.
23. Of the Rulers of the United States of America.
24. Of Christian Men's Goods.
25. Of a Christian Man's Oath.

Of Sanctification.
Of the Duty of Christians to the Civil Authority.
