= Communion token =

Metal coin once used by Reformed churches

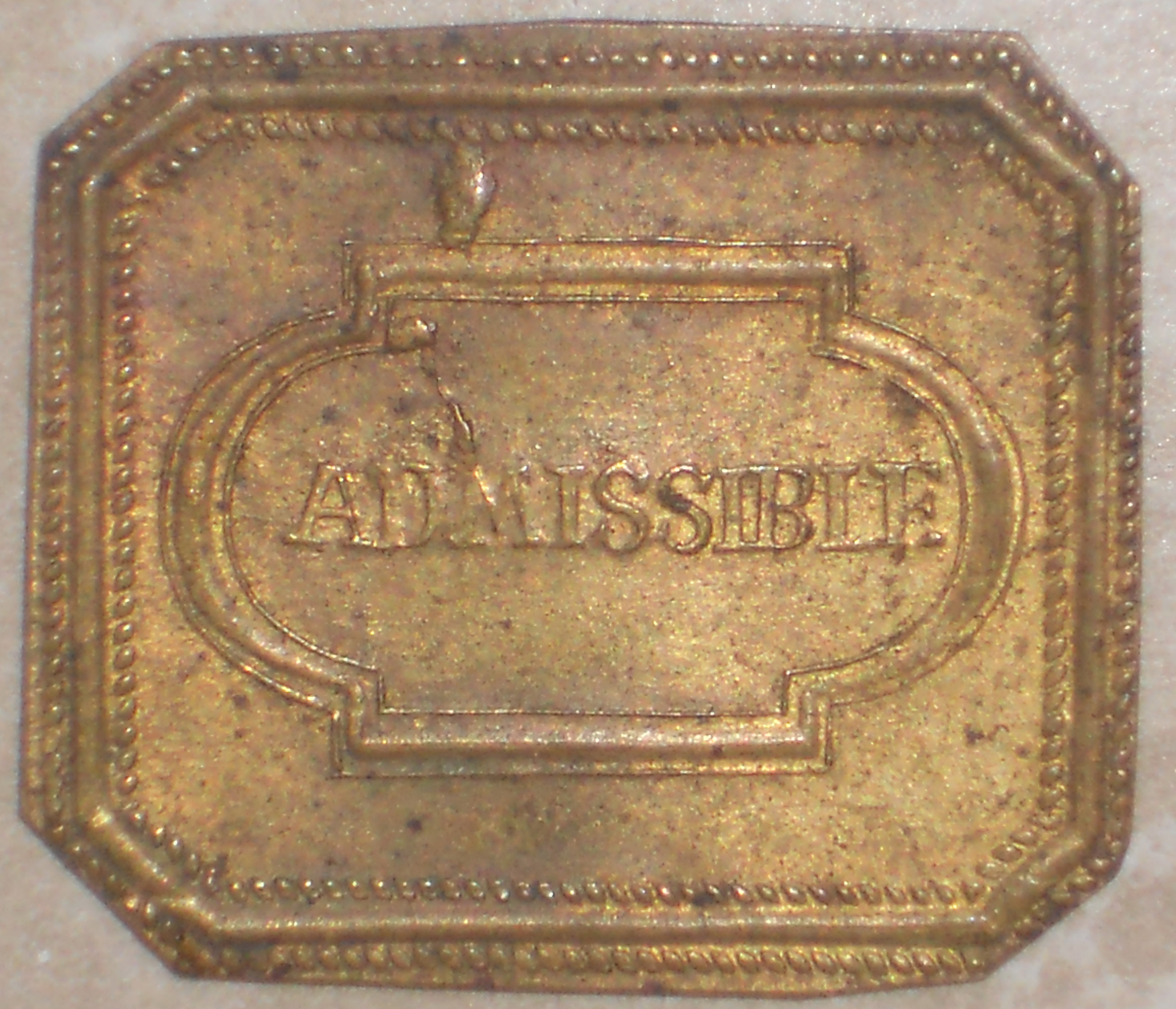
A communion token with the word ADMISSIBLE, used by the Huguenot refugee community in Berlin

A communion token is a metal token issued to members of Reformed churches in order to provide them entrance to the Lord's Supper. There were many types issued in Scotland in the 18th and 19th centuries, but they were largely superseded by communion cards.

== Overview ==
Communion tokens were first suggested in 1560 by John Calvin and Pierre Viret in Geneva, and although the city council rejected the practice, the following year their idea was implemented in Nîmes and Le Mans. By 1586 communion tokens were in use at the Walloon church in Amsterdam. However, most were issued in Scotland, where over 5,000 types have been recorded. They were also issued in many other countries, especially Australia, New Zealand, Canada and the United States. Tokens were also issued by Presbyterian churches in Corfu, Florence, Hartslog, Madeira, Port Louis, Bombay, Cochin, Berbice, Demerara and Kingston, Jamaica. Most tokens are from the 19th century, but R. M. Grieg wrote in 1964 that they were still used by "a few congregations in the Presbyterian Church of Eastern Australia." Communion tokens were also used in Scottish Episcopal churches.

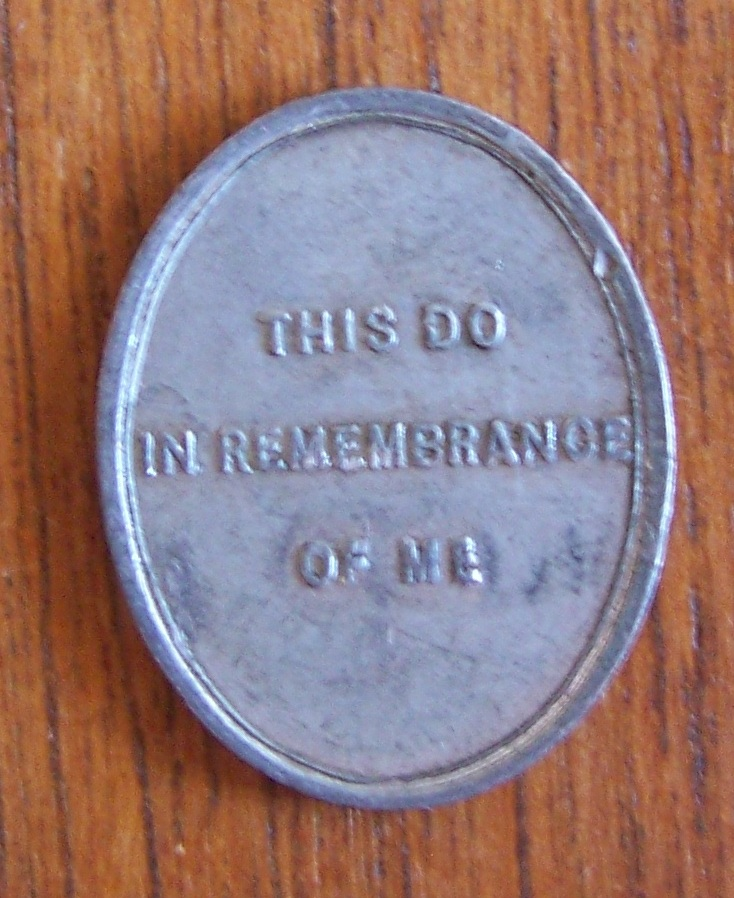
The reverse of a token from South Leith Parish Church

The issuing of these tokens is dependent on the practice of closed communion, in which only members of the church are allowed to participate. Raymond Mentzer says that "to avoid profanation of the Eucharist, the elders in the role as moral watchdogs distributed these entry counters to those members of the faithful whom they deemed qualified by virtue of correct belief and proper conduct." The distribution of the tokens would normally be preceded by catechetical instruction.

The Glens of Antrim Historical Society notes that "from the end of the nineteenth century metal tokens were gradually replaced by communion cards and rules regarding admission to the Lord’s Table were eased, allowing visitors who were members of other denominations, on profession of their faith to communicate."

Many tokens have verses on them, such as "This do in remembrance of me" (1 Corinthians 11:24) or "Let a man examine himself" (1 Corinthians 11:28). They were made of lead or another base metal, and came in a variety of shapes: round, oval, square or oblong. Earlier tokens had the ministers' initials on them, and many had the name of the church. When the Free Church of Scotland was formed in 1843, many tokens were issued with that year and were used as stock tokens in many congregations. The burning bush is found on many tokens, as are objects such as a Bible, communion cup or communion table, or else Christian symbols such as the fish, lamb or cross.

The Dunblane Museum has a collection of over 6000 tokens on display at the museum.

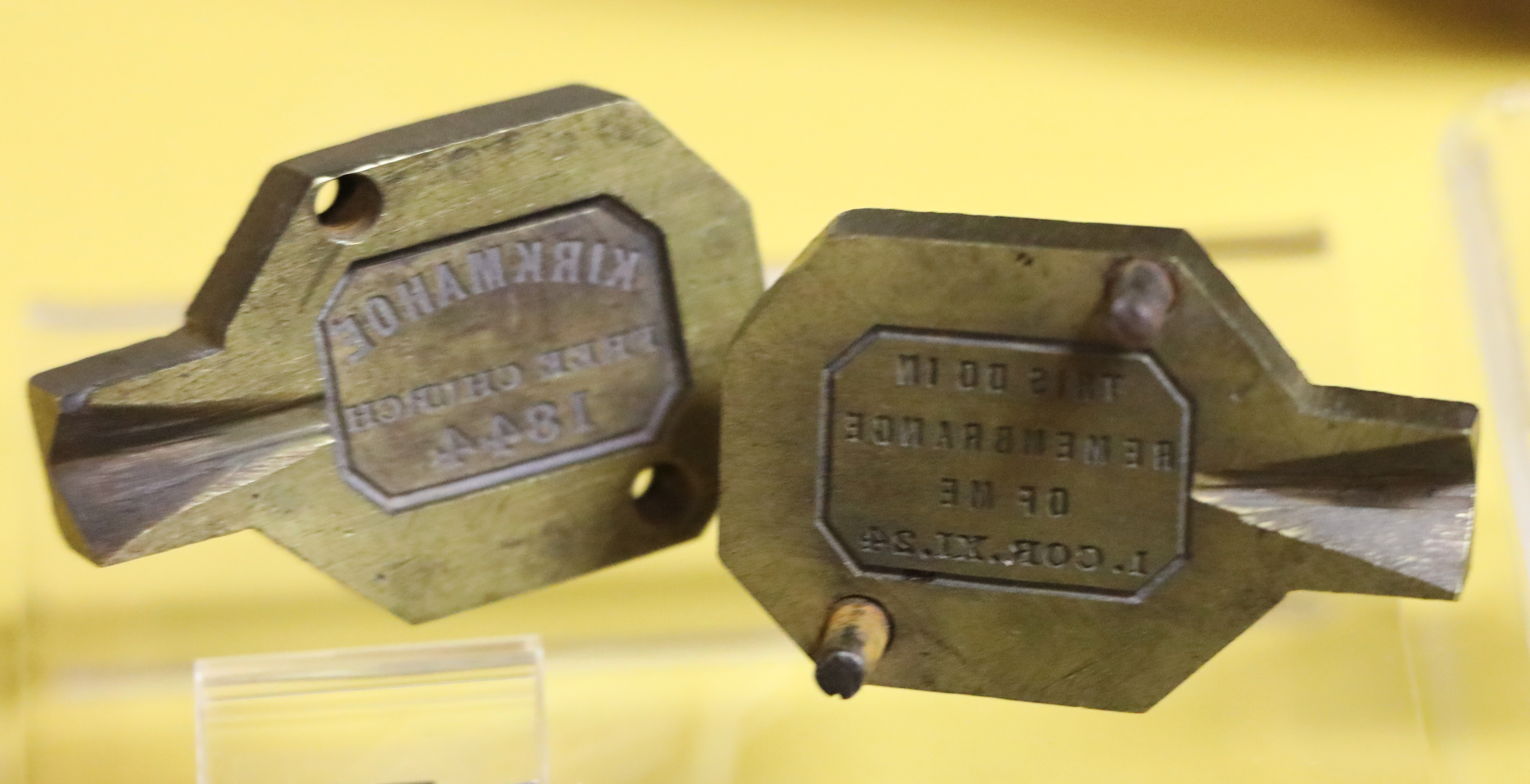
A mould for making tokens

Communion tokens belong to the field of exonumia.

== See also ==
- Open communion
