= Open communion =

Christian Eucharistic practice

Open communion, also known as open table, eucharistic hospitality, or eucharistic sharing, is a practice of some Christian Churches of allowing both members of their denomination, as well as non-members, to receive the Eucharist. Most churches that practice open communion require that the communicant be a baptized believer, and other requirements may apply as well. Christian denominations that practice open communion include Old Catholics, Moravians, Anglicans, Methodists, Community of Christ, and Pentecostals, as well as certain Lutherans, Reformed Christians (including some in the Presbyterian, Congregationalist, and Continental Reformed churches), Baptists and Plymouth Brethren. Those Christian denominations that practice open communion hold that the Eucharist is Christ’s Supper and therefore, all are welcome to commune.

Open communion is the opposite of closed communion, in which the sacrament is reserved for members of the particular church or others with which it is in a relationship of full communion or fellowship, or has otherwise recognized for that purpose. Closed communion may refer to either a particular denomination or an individual congregation serving Communion only to its own members.

== Affirmation ==
Generally, churches that offer open communion to other Christians do not require an explicit affirmation of Christianity from the communicant before distributing the elements; the act of receiving is an implicit affirmation. Some churches make an announcement before communion begins such as "We invite all who have professed a faith in Christ to join us at the table."

Open communion is generally practiced in churches where the elements are passed through the congregation (also called self-communication). However, it is also practiced in some churches that have a communion procession, where the congregation comes forward to receive communion in front of the altar; such is the case in the United Methodist Church, the Episcopal Church, most Anglican churches, and some Lutheran churches.

== Supporting belief ==
Those practising open communion generally believe that the invitation to receive communion is an invitation to Christ's table, and that it is not the province of human beings to interfere between an individual and Christ. Some traditions maintain that there are certain circumstances under which individuals should not present themselves for (and should voluntarily refrain from receiving) communion. However, if those individuals were to present themselves for communion, they would not be denied. In other traditions, the concept of being "unfit to receive" is unknown, and the actual refusal to distribute the elements to an individual would be considered scandalous.

== Practitioners ==
=== Old Catholic ===
The Old Catholic Church practices open communion.

Some Independent Catholic Churches, such as the American Catholic Church in the United States, American National Catholic Church, and Brazilian Catholic Apostolic Church practice open communion.

All bodies in the Liberal Catholic Movement practise open communion as a matter of policy.

=== Lutheran ===
The Churches of Denmark, Norway and Sweden are open communion churches.

Most churches in the Evangelical Lutheran Church in America practise their own form of open communion, offering the Eucharist to adults without receiving catechetical instruction, provided they are baptized and believe in the Real Presence.

=== Moravian/Hussite ===
The Moravian Church practices open communion.

=== Reformed ===
The Presbyterian Church (USA), Presbyterian - ECO, the Presbyterian Church in America, the Cumberland Presbyterian Church, and the United Church of Christ practice eucharistic hospitality.

=== Anglican ===
Open communion subject to baptism is an official policy of the Church of England and churches in the Anglican Communion.

The official policy of the Protestant Episcopal Church in the United States of America is to only invite baptized persons to receive communion. However, many parishes do not insist on this and practise open communion.

In the Anglican Communion, as well as in many other traditional Christian denominations, those who are not baptized may come forward in the communion line with their arms crossed over their chest, in order to receive a blessing from the priest, in lieu of Holy Communion. This practice is also used in the Roman Catholic church at funeral masses, where attendees frequently include non-Catholics.

=== Methodist ===
The Methodist Church prefers to use the term "open table" to emphasize that all may approach the Communion table. The Allegheny Wesleyan Methodist Connection, United Methodist Church, Free Methodist Church, Global Methodist Church, and African Methodist Episcopal Church have an open table.

Wesleyans practice open communion.

=== Keswickian ===
The Christian and Missionary Alliance holds to open communion.

=== Baptist ===
The Free Will Baptists practice open communion, Most churches in the Southern Baptist Convention (where ultimately the decision is made by each local church) practice open communion.

=== United Protestant ===
The Uniting Church in Australia practises open communion, inviting all attending to participate.

=== Plymouth Brethren ===
The Plymouth Brethren were founded on the basis of an open communion with any baptized Christian: today, following John Nelson Darby, Exclusive Brethren practise closed communion, and Open Brethren practise open communion on the basis of "receiving to the Lord's table those whom He has received, time being allowed for confidence to be established in our minds that those who we receive are the Lord's."

=== Pentecostal and Charismatic ===
The Calvary Chapel practices open communion.

=== Nondenominational ===
Churches of Christ, though holding to a closed communion view, in practice do not prohibit visitors from taking communion, on the view that per 1 Corinthians 11:28 the visitor must "examine himself" and decide to partake or decline (i.e. it is not for the minister, elders/deacons, or members to decide who may or may not partake); thus, the practice is more akin to open communion.

=== Mormon ===
Within the Latter Day Saint movement, the Community of Christ practices open communion. The LDS Church, on the other hand, views its corresponding ceremony (known as the Sacrament) as having meaning only for those baptized in the church. However, the church does not forbid other people from participating, unless they have been excommunicated.

=== Gnosticism ===
Among Gnostic churches, both the Ecclesia Gnostica and the Apostolic Johannite Church practise open communion.

=== Nontrinitarian Restorationist ===
Within the Nontrinitarian groups, the Church of God General Conference practices open communion, as well as many Unitarian and Universalist Christian churches such as King's Chapel in Boston, Massachusetts.

== Position of the Catholic Church ==
The Catholic Church does not practise or recognise open communion. In general it permits access to its Eucharistic communion only to baptized Catholics. Catholics can only receive Holy Communion if they are in a state of grace, this is without any mortal sin: "A person who is conscious of grave sin (mortal sin) is not to celebrate Mass or receive the body of the Lord without previous sacramental confession unless there is a grave reason and there is no opportunity to confess; in this case the person is to remember the obligation to make an act of perfect contrition which includes the resolution of confessing as soon as possible."

In lieu of Holy Communion, some parishes invite non-Catholics to come forward in the line, with their arms crossed over their chest, and receive a blessing from the priest. However, Canon 844 of the 1983 Code of Canon Law of the Latin Church and the parallel canon 671 of the Code of Canons of the Eastern Churches also recognizes that in certain circumstances, by way of exception, and under certain conditions, access to these sacraments may be permitted, or even commended, for Christians of other Churches and ecclesial Communities.

Thus it permits Eastern Christians who are not in full communion with the Catholic Church (Eastern Orthodox Church, Oriental Orthodoxy and Assyrian Church of the East) to receive Communion from Catholic ministers, if they request it of their own accord and are properly disposed, and it applies the same rule also to some Western Churches that the Holy See judges to be in a situation similar to that of Eastern Christians with regard to the sacraments.

On 15 November 2015, while at Christuskirche in Rome Pope Francis answered a Lutheran woman wishing to be able to participate in Holy Communion with her Catholic husband: "It is a question that each person must answer for themselves … there is one baptism, one faith, one Lord, so talk to the Lord and move forward". In the following year at Lund Cathedral, in a joint Lutheran-Catholic service commemorating the Reformation, Pope Francis and Bishop Munib Younan (the head of the Lutheran World Federation) "jointly pledged to remove the obstacles to full unity between their Churches, leading eventually to shared Eucharist."

Recognizing that "that everyone in a marriage that binds denominations," the Catholic Church in Germany in 2018 produced a pastoral handout allowing Lutheran spouses of Catholics to receive Communion from Catholic ministers in certain cases, 'provided they "affirm the Catholic faith in the Eucharist".' Thus far, Archbishop Hans-Josef Becker (Roman Catholic Archdiocese of Paderborn), Archbishop Stefan Heße (Roman Catholic Archdiocese of Hamburg), Archbishop Ludwig Schick (Roman Catholic Diocese of Fulda), and Bishop Franz Jung (Roman Catholic Diocese of Würzburg) have implemented the pastoral document, in addition to Bishops Gerhard Feige of Magdeburg and Franz-Josef Bode of Osnabrück declaring their intention to implement the pastoral document well. Bishop Franz Jung, while celebrating a Jubilee Mass on 5 July 2018 at Würzburg Cathedral, called inter-denominational marriages "denomination-uniting" and thus "especially invited" couples in which one spouse is Protestant to receive the Eucharist during his sermon.

For other baptized Christians (such as Anglicans, Methodists and other Protestants) under the jurisdiction of other episcopal conferences, the conditions are more severe. Only in danger of death or if, in the judgment of the local bishop, there is a grave and pressing need, may members of these Churches who cannot approach a minister of their own Church be invited to receive the Eucharist, if they spontaneously ask for it, demonstrate that they have the catholic faith in the Eucharist, and are properly disposed.

Catholic priests have sometimes not observed these rules, giving Holy Communion to non-Catholics sometimes unknowingly. Notably, Pope John Paul II gave Holy Communion to Brother Roger, a Reformed pastor and founder of the Taizé Community, several times; in addition Cardinal Ratzinger (later Pope Benedict XVI) also gave Brother Roger the Eucharist. Moreover, after Brother Roger's death, at the Mass celebrated for him in France, "communion wafers were given to the faithful indiscriminately, regardless of denomination".

The Catholic Church does not allow its own faithful to receive Communion from non-Catholic ministers in whose churches these sacraments are valid, apart from in extreme cases, such as danger of death, and only if it recognizes the validity of the sacraments of that Church. Other conditions are that it be physically or morally impossible for the Catholic to approach a Catholic minister, that it be a case of real need or spiritual benefit, and that the danger of error or indifferentism be avoided.

== Position of the Lutheran Church ==
The Lutheran Church has a variety of practices, depending on denominational polity. Some branches of Lutheranism, such as the Lutheran Church – Missouri Synod and the Wisconsin Evangelical Lutheran Synod, do not practice open communion; they exclude non-members whose denominations are not in fellowship and require catechetical instructions for all people before receiving the Eucharist. This generally stems from an understanding that sharing communion is a sign of Christian unity; where that unity is not present, neither should Eucharistic sharing be present. Some Lutheran church bodies use the term "altar and pulpit fellowship" to refer to their specific practices.

Other parts of the Lutheran Church, including the Evangelical Lutheran Church in America (ELCA), The Evangelical Lutheran Church in Canada, and many members of the Lutheran World Federation, practice open communion and welcome all Baptized Christians to commune while ensuring that Lutheran belief on the real presence of Christ in the Eucharist is declared orally or in writing. Guests are then left to decide whether they should or should not receive the Eucharist. The ELCA has specific communion sharing agreements with a number of other Christian denominations, encouraging the sharing of the sacrament across belief system boundaries. The understanding that lies behind this practice is that Communion is both a foretaste of eschatological Christian unity as well as an effective means of fostering that unity.

The Evangelical Church in Germany, which is a federation of Lutheran and Reformed churches, has an open communion.

== See also ==
- Excommunication
- Feeneyism
