= Closed communion =

Christian religious practice

Closed communion is the practice of restricting the serving of the elements of Holy Communion (also called Eucharist, The Lord's Supper) to those who are members in good standing of a particular church, denomination, sect, or congregation. Though the meaning of the term varies slightly in different Christian theological traditions, it generally means that a church or denomination limits participation (with respect to the Eucharist) either to members of their own church, members of their own denomination, or members of some specific class (e.g., baptized members of evangelical churches). This restriction is based on various parameters, one of which is baptism. See also intercommunion.

A closed-communion church is one that excludes certain individuals (it specifically identifies) from receiving the communion. This standard varies from church to church. This is the known practice of most traditional churches that pre-date the Protestant Reformation. Other churches following the Protestant Reformation have their own rules of restrictions. In current churches of various denominations, across the spectrum, the rules of participating in the Eucharist are varied.

Churches which practice open communion allow all Christians to partake in the Lord's Supper, with membership in a particular Christian community not required to receive bread and wine; this in contrast to pre-Reformation churches, which hold that what is received in their celebrations ceases to be bread and wine.

== Practice ==
=== Roman Catholic Church ===
The Roman Catholic Church practices closed communion. However, provided that "necessity requires it or true spiritual advantage suggests it" and that the danger of error or indifferentism is avoided, canon 844 of the 1983 Code of Canon Law of the Latin Church and the parallel canon 671 allow, in particular exceptional circumstances that are regulated by the diocesan bishop or conference of bishops, members who cannot approach a Catholic minister to receive the Eucharist from ministers of churches that have a valid Eucharist. It also permits properly disposed members of the Eastern churches who are not in full communion with the Roman Church (Eastern Orthodox Church, Oriental Orthodoxy and Assyrian Church of the East), and of churches judged to be in the same situation with regard to the sacraments to receive the Eucharist from Catholic ministers, if they seek it of their own accord. The Catholic Church distinguishes between Churches whose celebration of the Eucharist, as well as holy orders, it recognizes as valid and those of other Christian communities. In the case that it is impossible to approach a Catholic minister, that it is a case of real need or spiritual benefit, and that the danger of error or indifferentism is avoided, the Catholic Church permits its faithful to receive Communion in Orthodox Churches, although Orthodox Churches do not honour this and only permit Orthodox Christians to receive Communion in Orthodox Churches. The Catholic Church does not ordinarily allow a Catholic to receive communion in a Protestant church, since it does not consider Protestant ministers to be priests ordained by bishops in a line of valid succession from the apostles, although Moravians, Anglicans and some Lutherans teach that they ordain their clergy in lines of apostolic succession. It applies this rule also to the Anglican Communion, pursuant to Apostolicae curae, a position that the Church of England disputed in Saepius officio. However, a non-Catholic Christian, as with a Catholic Christian who has not yet received his or her First Communion, may come forward in the line, with his/her arms crossed over the chest, in order to receive a blessing, in lieu of Holy Communion:

"Even though some may not receive sacramental communion, all are united in some way with the Holy Spirit. The traditional idea of spiritual communion is an important one to remember and reaffirm. The invitation often given at Mass to those who may not receive sacramental communion - for example, children before their First Communion and adults who are not Catholics - to receive a ‘blessing’ at the moment of Communion emphasises that a deep spiritual communion is possible even when we do not share together the sacrament of the body and blood of Christ”. —Catholic Bishops' Conference of England and Wales (2005)

This blessing giving to those who are not communing is a short prayer, with the following being prescribed by the Auckland Diocesan Liturgy Office: "May the Lord bless you. Amen." or "May the Love of God be in your heart. Amen." or "May Father, Son and Holy Spirit bless you. Amen."

The Directory for the Application of Principles and Norms on Ecumenism warns that "due consideration should be given to the discipline of the Eastern Churches for their own faithful and any suggestion of proselytism should be avoided." Recognizing that "that everyone in a marriage that binds denominations," the Catholic Church in Germany has produced a pastoral handout allowing Lutheran and Reformed spouses of Roman Catholics to receive Communion from Roman Catholic ministers in certain cases, 'provided they “affirm the Catholic faith in the Eucharist.”' Thus far, Archbishop Hans-Josef Becker (Roman Catholic Archdiocese of Paderborn), Archbishop Stefan Heße (Roman Catholic Archdiocese of Hamburg), Archbishop Ludwig Schick (Roman Catholic Diocese of Fulda), and Bishop Franz Jung (Roman Catholic Diocese of Würzburg) have implemented the pastoral document, in addition to Bishops Gerhard Feige of Magdeburg and Franz-Josef Bode of Osnabrück declaring their intention to implement the pastoral document well. Bishop Franz Jung, while celebrating a Jubilee Mass on July 5 at Würzburg Cathedral, called inter-denominational marriages "denomination-uniting" and thus "especially invited" couples in which one spouse is Protestant to receive the Eucharist during his sermon.

Other Western Christians under the jurisdiction of other episcopal conferences are limited by stricter conditions. Those who do personally share Catholic belief in the Eucharist (as the body and blood of the risen Christ, accompanied by his soul and divinity, under the appearances of bread and wine) are permitted to receive the sacrament when there is danger of death or, in the judgment of the diocesan bishop or of the episcopal conference, some other grave necessity urges it and on condition that "the person be unable to have recourse for the sacrament to a minister of his or her own Church or ecclesial Community, ask for the sacrament of his or her own initiative, manifest Catholic faith in the sacrament and be properly disposed".

Exceptions do occur, however. Notably, Pope John Paul II gave Holy Communion to Brother Roger, a Reformed pastor and founder of the Taizé Community, several times; in addition Cardinal Ratzinger (later Pope Benedict XVI) also gave Brother Roger the Eucharist. Moreover, after Brother Roger's death, at the Mass celebrated for him in France, "communion wafers were given to the faithful indiscriminately, regardless of denomination".

=== Eastern Orthodox Church ===
The Eastern Orthodox Church, comprising 14 to 16 autocephalous Orthodox hierarchical churches, is even more strictly a closed-communion Church. Thus, a member of the Russian Orthodox Church attending the Divine Liturgy in a Greek Orthodox Church will be allowed to receive communion and vice versa but, although Protestants, non-Trinitarian Christians, or Catholics may otherwise fully participate in an Orthodox Divine Liturgy, they will be excluded from communion. In the strictest sense, non-Orthodox may be present at the Divine Liturgy only up to the exclamation "The doors! The doors!" and ought to leave the church after that. However, this attitude has been relaxed in most Orthodox churches; a non-communicant may stay and participate in the Divine Liturgy but may not partake of the Eucharist. Thus, while in certain circumstances the Catholic Church allows its faithful who cannot approach a Catholic minister to receive the Eucharist from an Eastern Orthodox priest, the Eastern Orthodox Church does not admit them to receive the Eucharist from its ministers. At the very end of the Divine Liturgy, all people are invited to come up to receive a little piece of bread, called antidoron, which is blessed but not consecrated, being taken from the same loaf as the bread used in the consecration. Non-Orthodox present at the Liturgy are not only permitted but even encouraged to receive the blessed bread as an expression of Christian fellowship and love.

The Eastern Orthodox Church is not in Communion with the Roman Church, nor is it in Communion with any Protestant denominational church. Eastern Orthodox Christians are forbidden from receiving Communion in any church other than Eastern Orthodox. Eastern Orthodox Churches accept to Holy Communion only baptized Eastern Orthodox Christians (such as Bulgarian Orthodox, Georgian Orthodox, Albanian Orthodox, etc.), and then only when they have prepared themselves by prayer, by appropriate fasting, and by confession of sins (although the frequency of confession varies between traditions). In addition, Orthodox bishops and other teachers make clear to their faithful that they can only properly receive communion from a canonically ordained priest or bishop within the context of the traditional Orthodox Divine Liturgy (which includes communion taken to the sick).

=== Lutheran Churches ===
Celebration of the Holy Eucharist in a parish of the Lutheran Church–Missouri Synod, with communicants kneeling at the chancel rails to receive the body of Christ.

Confessional Lutheran churches, including the Lutheran Church–Missouri Synod and the Wisconsin Evangelical Lutheran Synod, practice closed communion and require catechetical instruction for all people before receiving the Eucharist. Failing to do so is condemned by these Lutherans as the sin of unionism. This teaching comes from 1 Corinthians 10:16-17 which says, "Is not the cup of thanksgiving for which we give thanks a participation in the blood of Christ? And is not the bread that we break a participation in the body of Christ? Because there is one loaf, we, who are many, are one body, for we all share the one loaf" and Paul's teaching of fellowship in 1 Corinthians 1:10, "I appeal to you, brothers and sisters, in the name of our Lord Jesus Christ, that all of you agree with one another in what you say and that there be no divisions among you, but that you be perfectly united in mind and thought." These Lutherans also take seriously God's threat in 1 Corinthians 11:27,29 that "Whoever eats the bread or drinks the cup of the Lord in an unworthy manner will be guilty of sinning against the body and blood of the Lord. A man ought to examine himself before he eats of the bread and drinks of this cup. For anyone who eats and drinks without recognizing the body of the Lord eats and drinks judgment on himself." Therefore, the belief is that, inviting those forward who have not been first instructed would be unloving on the church's part, because they would be inviting people forward to sin. This is described as akin to letting someone drink poison without stopping him.

The Evangelical Lutheran Church in America (ELCA), the largest Lutheran Church in America, however, does not practice closed communion, but rather "eucharistic hospitality." In terms of guests receiving the Sacrament, according to this practice, the burden of decision of admittance to the Sacrament is not on the host congregation, but on its guests. The invitation to the Sacrament is extended to "all baptized persons," along with "a brief written or oral statement in worship which teaches Christ's presence in the sacrament." In terms of members receiving the Sacrament, reception of the Sacrament is always to include "continuing catechesis [which] include[s] instruction for Holy Communion," but this is not a prerequisite for first communion, and even infants may be permitted to receive the Sacrament at or after the service of their baptism.

Those not communing are invited to come forward with their "arms crossed across their chest" in order to receive a blessing from the priest.

Many Lutheran churches restrict the allowance to commune to those who are validly baptized (usually understood to be all trinitarian baptisms done with the intent of bringing the baptized into the church catholic), but with no further restrictions beyond that. Major examples of this include the Nordic lutheran churches, such as the Church of Sweden

=== Baptists ===
Some Baptists and all American Baptist Association congregations practice closed communion even more strictly than do the Catholic, Lutheran, and Eastern Orthodox churches. They restrict the partaking of communion (or the Lord's Supper) to members of the local church observing the ordinance. Thus members from other churches, even members of other local churches of the same denomination, are excluded from participation. The Strict Baptists (now many called Grace Baptists) in the United Kingdom derive their name from this practice. In the United States the custom is usually, but not exclusively, associated with Landmark ecclesiology.

The closed communion practiced by Primitive Baptists admits participation by Primitive Baptists who do not belong to the local church.

=== Other groups ===
The Orthodox Presbyterian Church, the Reformed Presbyterian Church, the American Presbyterian Church the Reformed Seventh-day Adventist Church, Exclusive Brethren, the Apostolic Christian Church, the Church of the Brethren, Mennonites, Amish, some Anglicans, the Church of God in Christ, the Church of God of Prophecy, and some other churches in the Reformed tradition also practice closed communion. Jehovah's Witnesses hold that only the 144,000 should receive communion. Other nontrinitarian Christians that practice closed communion include the Church of God (Seventh Day), Christadelphians, and Oneness Pentecostals such as the True Jesus Church.

Although Churches of Christ doctrinally hold to closed communion, they practice open communion by not prohibiting visitors from taking communion. That believe that according to 1 Corinthians 11:28 the visitor must "examine himself" and decide to partake or decline (i.e., it is not for the minister, elders/deacons, or members to decide who may or may not partake).

=== Latter Day Saints ===
The Church of Jesus Christ of Latter-day Saints (LDS Church) does not take any measures to prevent others from participating. However, for members it stands as a remembrance of covenants made. The Community of Christ (formerly the Reorganized Church of Jesus Christ of Latter Day Saints) practices open communion.

== "Close Communion" ==
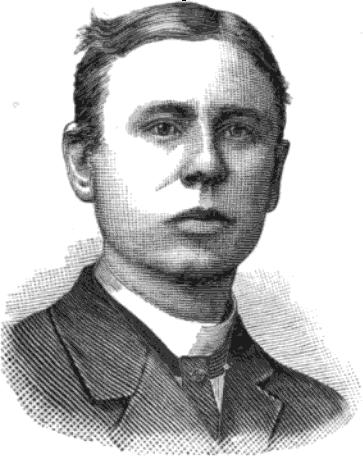
Franz Pieper, June 27, 1852 - June 3, 1931

Among the modern descendants of the Anabaptists, the Amish, Old Order Mennonites and Conservative Mennonites all practice what they term close communion, restricting communion to members of a local congregation only.

The term close communion normally means the same thing as closed communion. However, some make a distinction, so the terms can be a source of confusion.

The most prominent distinction (which in some circles may be called "cracked communion") is one where a member of a congregation holding the "same faith and practice" as the hosting congregation (generally meaning being a member of a congregation in the same or a similar denomination) may participate in the service, but a member of another denomination may or may not.

For example, a Southern Baptist congregation practicing close communion:

- would allow a member of another Southern Baptist congregation to participate, on the premise that both congregations are of the "same faith and practice" as they are both in the same denomination, and
- would (most likely) also allow a member of an Independent Baptist congregation to participate; though the congregations are of different Baptist groups the differences between them are mainly in the area of church organization and not in doctrinal issues, thus falling under the "same faith and practice" rule, and also
- might or might not allow a member of a Pentecostal church to participate (might on the basis of both having similar views on salvation and the Lord's Supper, but might not due to other significant differences), but
- would almost certainly exclude a Lutheran or Catholic, on the basis that Baptists and Lutherans/Catholics are not of the "same faith and practice" as pertaining to the Lord's Supper.
- In practice, churches that do not require people to approach a communion table usually pass the elements among the attendees (similar to the offering plate) or provide them ahead of time in a self-serve manner, and as such do not actively prohibit anyone who wishes to partake from doing so, regardless of personal views.

The Reformed Presbyterian Church of Australia allows communion to those who can assent to the first three terms of its church covenants, and discuss this with the elders ahead of time. They don't appear to distinguish the term "close communion" from "closed communion", though.

The earliest use of close communion comes from a mistranslation of the Lutheran theologian Franz August Otto Pieper's Christian Dogmatics. The term has since spread, although both the first edition and later translations corrected the error to "closed communion."

== Supporting belief ==
Complex reasons underlie the belief. In 1 Corinthians 10, it is written: "The chalice of benediction which we bless, is it not the communion of the blood of Christ? And the bread which we break, is it not the partaking of the body of the Lord? For we, being many, are one bread, one body: all that partake of one bread." Since all Christians are now no longer of a unity that would allow common celebration of the Eucharist between them all, the bread being a visible sign of union, communion is not taken together between separated Churches and communities. Additionally as described in 1 Corinthians 11:29: "For he that eateth and drinketh unworthily, eateth and drinketh damnation to himself, not discerning the Lord's body." It is deemed better to prevent outsiders from taking communion than to risk them taking communion "unworthily". Catholics thus see the communion as sinful for those who do not recognise the Real Presence or who are otherwise 'unworthy', i.e. who are not in the 'right place' to accept the Eucharist (free of mortal sin). Christian communities that keep close communion often also have accountability within those members that partake of the communion, so that they do not run afoul of this problem. Such communities will also delay taking communion until the members (the church body) can take communion in Christian unity, as required by 1Co 11:33 "Wherefore, my brethren, when ye come together to eat, tarry one for another."

Justin Martyr indicated that the second-century Christian Church had three requirements for sharing in the Eucharist: identity of belief, Christian baptism, and moral life. "No one may share in the eucharist except those who believe in the truth of our teachings and have been washed in the bath which confers forgiveness of sins and rebirth, and who live according to Christ's commands" (First Apology, 66).

Corporate responsibility is another argument often used in favour of closed communion. The Heidelberg Catechism, for example, says that those who "by confession and life, declare themselves unbelieving and ungodly" are not to be admitted to the Lord's Supper, for then "the covenant of God would be profaned, and his wrath kindled against the whole congregation." Church leaders are obliged to do all they can to ensure that this does not happen, and hence "exclude such persons... till they show amendment of life," (Q & A 82).

== Fenced table ==
In Protestant theology, a fenced table is a communion table which is open only to accredited members of the Christian community. Fencing the table is thus the opposite of open communion, where the invitation to the sacrament is extended to "all who love the Lord" and members of any denomination are welcome at their own discretion.

The phrase goes back to early Scottish Calvinism, where the communion table literally had a fence around it, with a gate at each end. The members of the congregation were allowed to pass the gate on showing their communion token, a specially minted coin which served as an admission ticket and was given only to those who were in good standing with the local congregation and could pass a test of the catechism. Examples of this kind of church furnishing are still to be seen in a very few highland churches.

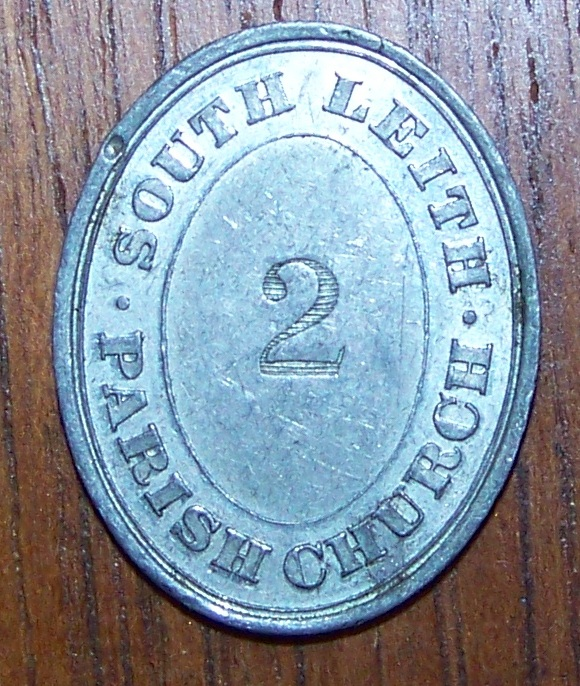
A communion token from South Leith Parish Church

The phrase "fencing the table" is also used metaphorically for other kinds of group demarcation and restrictive practices.

== Communion tokens ==
Many Scottish Protestant churches used to give tokens to members passing a religious test prior to the day of communion, then required the token for entry. Some US and other churches also used communion tokens.

== See also ==
- Open communion
- Sister Churches (ecclesiology)
