= ANCC =

ANCC may refer to:

- All Nations Christian College, a missions college, in Hertfordshire
- American National Catholic Church, an independent Catholic denomination
- American Nurses Credentialing Center, a nursing credentialing organization in the US
