= ACCUS =

ACCUS may refer to:

- American Catholic Church in the United States
- Automobile Competition Committee for the United States
