= Demographics of Shenzhen =

Number of people permanently residing in Shenzhen, at the end of each year
Year	Pop.	±%
1979	314,100	—
1980	332,900	+6.0%
1981	366,900	+10.2%
1982	449,500	+22.5%
1983	595,200	+32.4%
1984	741,300	+24.5%
1985	881,500	+18.9%
1986	935,600	+6.1%
1987	1,054,400	+12.7%
1988	1,201,400	+13.9%
1989	1,416,000	+17.9%
1990	1,677,800	+18.5%
1991	2,267,600	+35.2%
1992	2,680,200	+18.2%
1993	3,359,700	+25.4%
1994	4,127,100	+22.8%
1995	4,491,500	+8.8%
1996	4,828,900	+7.5%
1997	5,277,500	+9.3%
1998	5,803,300	+10.0%
1999	6,325,600	+9.0%
2000	7,012,400	+10.9%
2001	7,245,700	+3.3%
2002	7,466,200	+3.0%
2003	7,782,700	+4.2%
2004	8,008,000	+2.9%
2005	8,277,500	+3.4%
2006	8,711,000	+5.2%
2007	9,123,700	+4.7%
2008	9,542,800	+4.6%
2009	9,950,100	+4.3%
2010	10,372,000	+4.2%
2011	10,467,400	+0.9%
2012	10,547,400	+0.8%
2013	10,628,900	+0.8%
2014	10,778,900	+1.4%
2015	11,378,700	+5.6%
2016	11,908,400	+4.7%
2017	12,528,300	+5.2%
2018	13,026,600	+4.0%
2019	13,438,800	+3.2%
Shenzhen Statistical Yearbook, 2020

As of 2020, Shenzhen had a total permanent population of 17,560,000, with 5,874,000 (33.4%) of them hukou holders (registered locally). As Shenzhen is a young city, senior citizens above 60 years old took up only 5.36 percent of the city's total population. Despite this, the life expectancy in Shenzhen is 81.25 in 2018, ranking among the top twenty cities in China. The male to female ratio in Shenzhen is 130 to 100, making the city having the highest sex disparity in comparison to other cities in Guangdong. Shenzhen also has a high birth rate compared to other Chinese cities with 21.7 babies for every 10,000 of its 13.44 million population in 2019. Based on the population of its total administrative area, Shenzhen is the fifth most populous city proper in China. Shenzhen is part of the Pearl River Delta Metropolitan Region (covering cities such as Guangzhou, Dongguan, Foshan, Zhongshan, Zhuhai, Huizhou, Hong Kong, and Macau), the world's largest urban area according to the World Bank, and has a population of 78 million according to the 2020 Census.

Before Shenzhen's establishment as a SEZ in 1980, the area was composed mainly of Hakka and Cantonese people. When the SEZ was established, the city attracted migrants from all around Guangdong, including Hakka, Cantonese, and Teochew, as well as migrants from Southern and Central Chinese provinces such as Hunan, Guangxi, Jiangxi, Sichuan, and Henan. Most of these migrants live in urban villages called chengzhongcun (城中村; 'village in the city') such as Baishizhou in the Nanshan District. Shenzhen also has a notable Korean minority based in the Nanshan District and the Futian District, with migrants moving to Shenzhen to work for South Korean companies that had branched out in the city when China started reform and opening up.

Due to Shenzhen's population overshooting the 14.8 million population target for 2016 to 2020, the Shenzhen justice bureau on 25 May 2021 had announced it would make it harder to earn a hukou to live in the city. In regards to the registered population (hukou), Shenzhen has seen an increase of 2.178 million or 58.9% of registered residents in the city from 2015 to 2020. In regards to permanent population, the city has seen an increase of 7,136,088 or 68.46% of permanent residents in the city from 2010 to 2020, creating an average annual growth rate of 5.35%.

== Historic ==
Graphics

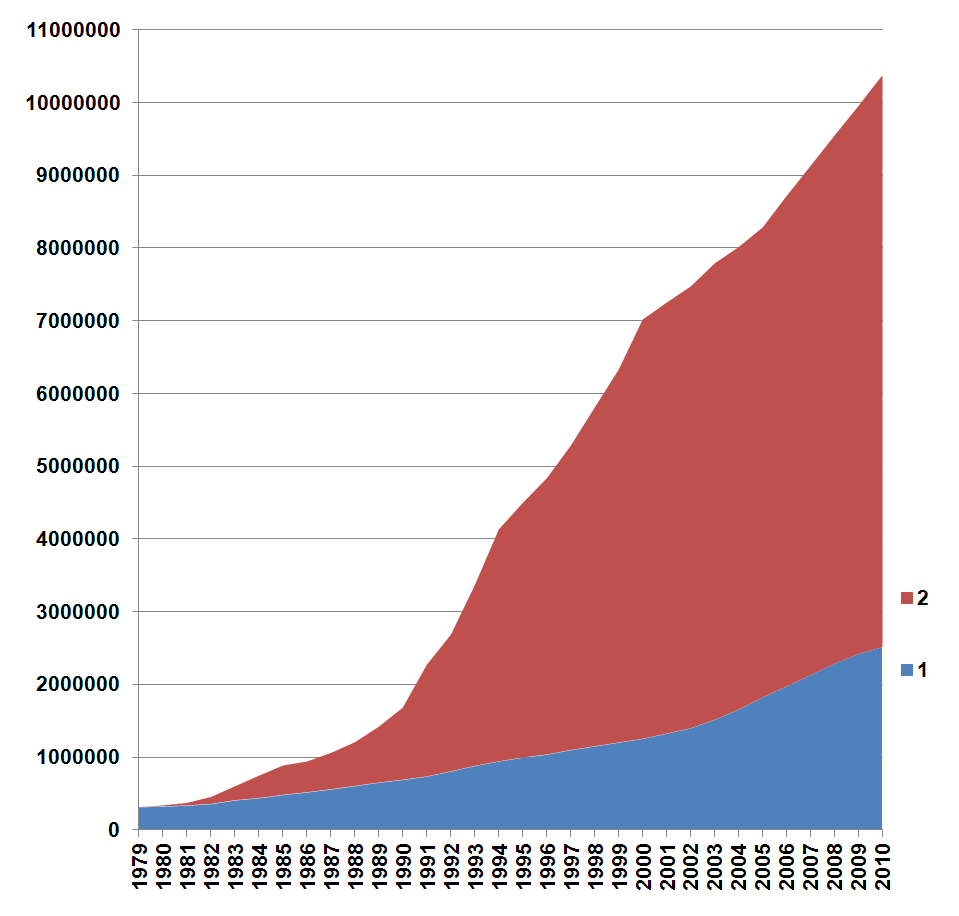
Shenzhen population dynamics
Legend:
population with permanent registration (hukou)
population with non-permanent registration

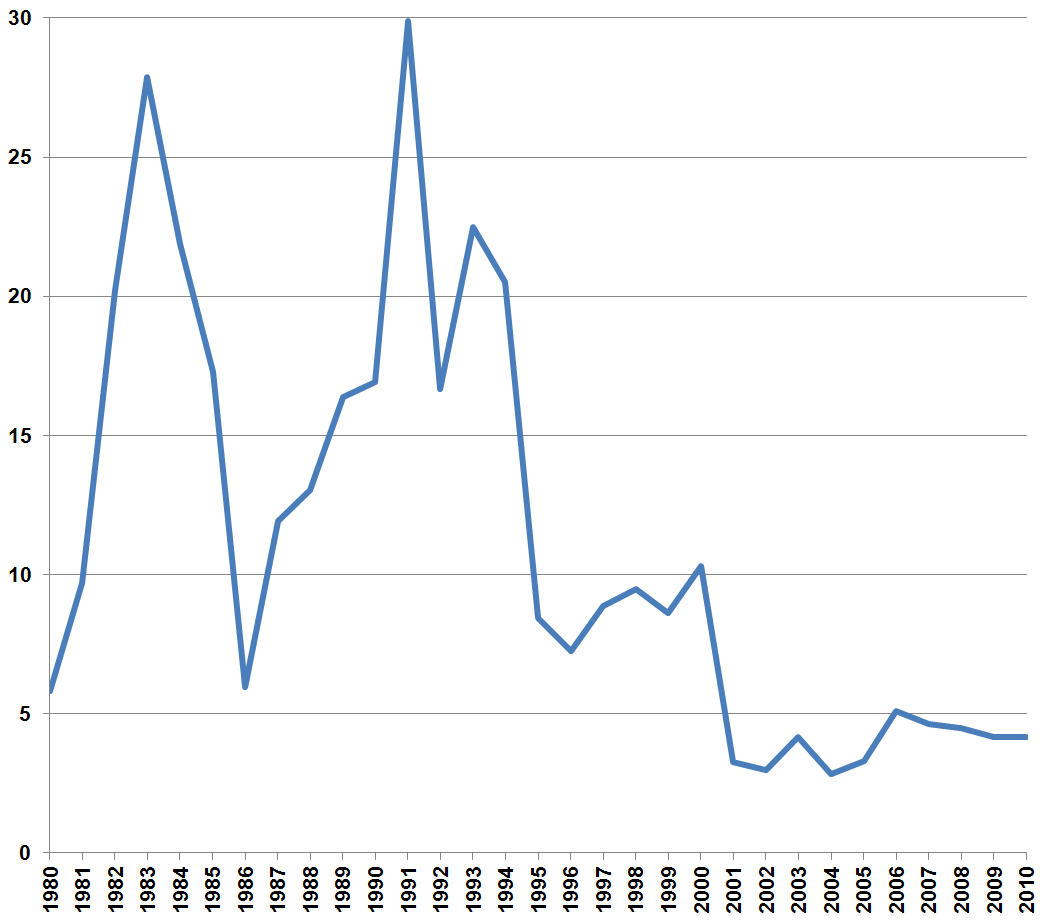
Shenzhen official annual population growth rate (%)

There had been migration into southern Guangdong province and what is now Shenzhen since the Southern Song dynasty (1127–1279) but the numbers increased dramatically since Shenzhen was established in the 1980s. In Guangdong province, it is the only city where the local languages (Cantonese, Shenzhen-Hakka and Teochew) is not the main language; it is Mandarin that is mostly spoken, with migrants/immigrants from all over China.

Shenzhen has seen its population and activity develop rapidly since the establishment of the SEZ as a magnet for migrants, beginning with blue collar or labor-intensive workers, giving the city the moniker 'the world's factory'. Shenzhen had an official population of over 10 million during the 2011 census. However, due to the large unregistered floating migrant population living in the city, some estimates put Shenzhen's actual population at around 20 million inside the administrative area given at any specific moment. The population growth of Shenzhen follows large scale trends; around 2012–13, the city's estimated growth slowed down to less than 1 percent due to rising migrant labor costs, migrant worker targeted reforms, and moving of factories out to periphery and neighboring Dongguan. By 2015, the high tech economy began to gradually replace the labor-intensive industries as the city gradually became a magnet for a new generation of migrants, this time educated, white collar workers. Migration into Shenzhen was further promoted by hard population caps imposed on other Tier I cities like Beijing and Shanghai, previously the top destinations for white collar workers. By the end of 2018, the official registered population had been estimated as just over 13 million a year over year increase of 500,000.

By 2020 the official population count was 17,560,000, leading to changes in residency requirements to discourage further migration into Shenzhen.

University of Wisconsin-Madison China demographics specialist Yi Fuxian stated that Shenzhen's birthrate was below 1.05, which while the highest of major cities in China, was not at the replacement level needed.

== Other statistics ==
At present, the average age in Shenzhen is less than 30. The age range is as follows: 8.49% between the age of 0 and 14, 88.41% between the age of 15 and 59, and 3.1% aged 65 or above.

The population structure has great diversity, ranging from intellectuals with a high level of education to migrant workers with poor education. It was reported in June 2007 that more than 20 percent of China's PhD graduates had worked in Shenzhen. Shenzhen was also elected as one of the top 10 cities in China for expatriates. Expatriates choose Shenzhen as a place to settle because of the city's job opportunities as well as the culture's tolerance and open-mindedness, and it was even voted China's Most Dynamic City and the City Most Favored by Migrant Workers in 2014.

According to a survey by the Hong Kong Planning Department, the number of cross-border commuters increased from about 7,500 in 1999 to 44,600 in 2009. More than half of them lived in Shenzhen. Though neighboring each other, daily commuters still need to pass through customs and immigration checkpoints, as travel between the SEZ and the Hong Kong Special Administrative Region (SAR) is restricted.

Mainland residents who wish to enter Hong Kong for visit are required to obtain an "Exit-Entry Permit for Travelling to and from Hong Kong and Macao". Shenzhen residents can have a special 1 year multiple-journey endorsement (but maximum 1 visit per week starting from April 13, 2015) This type of exit endorsement is only issued to people who have hukou in certain regions.(See Exit-Entry Permit for Travelling to and from Hong Kong and Macau.)

== Ethnic groups ==
=== Ethnic Koreans ===
As of 2007 there were about 20,000 people of Korean origins in Shenzhen, with the Nanshan and Futian districts having significant numbers. That year the chairperson of the Korean Chamber of Commerce and Industry, Kang Hee-bang, stated that about 10,000 lived in Overseas Chinese Town (OCT). Shekou, the area around Shenzhen University, and Donghai Garden housing estate had other significant concentrations. Donghai Garden began attracting Koreans due to its transportation links and because, around 1998, it was the sole residential building classified as 3-A. As of 2014 Donghai had about 200 Korean families.

South Koreans began going to the Shenzhen area during the 1980s as part of the reform and opening up era, and this increased when South Korea established formal diplomatic relations with the PRC.

In 2007 about 500 South Korean companies in Shenzhen were involved in China-South Korean trade, and there were an additional 500 South Korean companies doing business in Shenzhen. In 2007 Kang stated that most of the Koreans in Shenzhen had lived there for five years or longer.

There is one Korean international school in Shenzhen, Korean International School in Shenzhen. As of 2007 there were some Korean children enrolled in schools for Chinese locals. As of 2014 spaces for foreign students in Shenzhen public schools were limited, so some Korean residents are forced to put their children in private schools. In addition, in 2007, there were about 900 Korean children in non-Chinese K-12 institutions; the latter included 400 of them at private international schools in Shekou, 300 in private schools in Luohu District, and 200 enrolled at the Baishizhou Bilingual School. Because many Korean students are not studying in Korean-medium schools, the Korean Chamber of Commerce and Industry operates a Korean Saturday School; it had about 600 students in 2007. The chamber uses rented space in the OCT Primary School as the Korean weekend school's classroom.

== Languages and religions ==
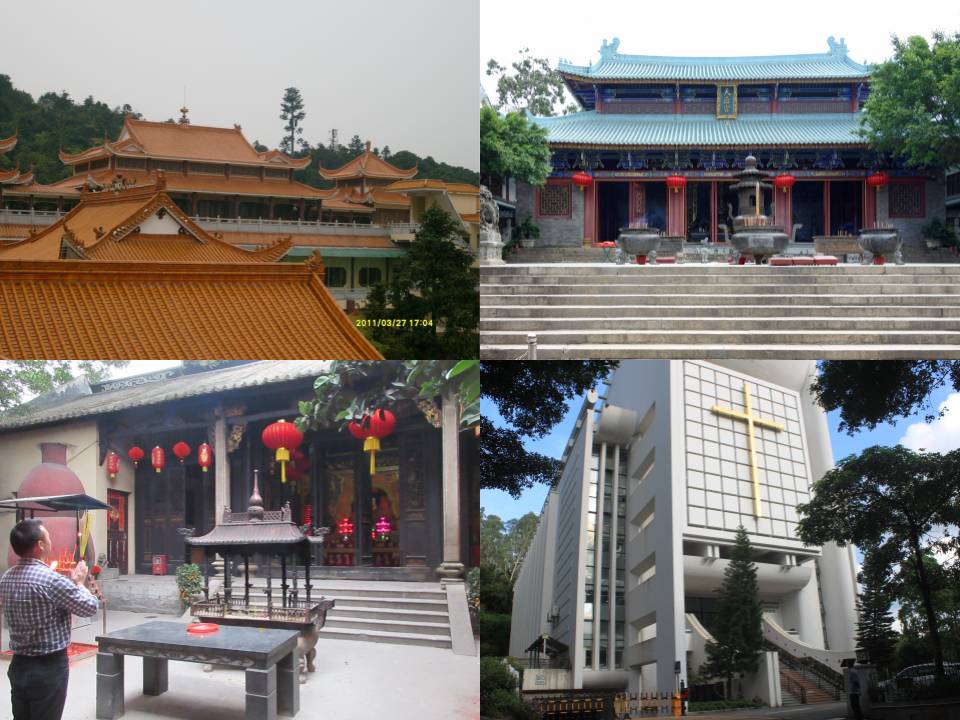
Clockwise starting top left: Hongfa Buddhist Temple, Temple of the Queen of Heaven (Mazu), Shenzhen Christian Church, Temple of Guandi

Prior to the establishment of Special Economic Zone, the indigenous local communities could be divided into Cantonese and Hakka speakers, which were two cultural and linguistic sub-ethnic groups vernacular to Guangdong province. Two Cantonese varieties were spoken locally. One was a fairly standard version, known as standard Cantonese. The other, spoken by several villages south of Fuhua Rd. was called Weitou dialect. Two or three Hong Kong villages south of the Shenzhen River also speak this dialect. This is consistent with the area settled by people who accompanied the Southern Song court to the south in the late 13th century. Younger generations of the Cantonese communities now speak the more standard version. Today, some aboriginals of the Cantonese and Hakka speaking communities disperse into urban settlements (e.g. apartments and villas), but most of them are still clustering in their traditional urban and suburban villages.

The influx of migrants from other parts of the country has drastically altered the city's linguistic landscape, as Shenzhen has undergone a language shift towards Mandarin, which was both promoted by the Chinese Central Government as a national lingua franca and natively spoken by most of the out-of-province immigrants and their descendants. However, in recent years multilingualism is on the rise as descendants of immigrants of out-of-province Mandarin native speakers begin to assimilate into the local culture through friends, television and other media. Despite the ubiquity of Mandarin Chinese, local languages such as Cantonese, Hakka, and Teochew are still commonly spoken among locals. Hokkien and Xiang are also sometimes observed.

According to the Department of Religious Affairs of the Shenzhen Municipal People's Government, the two main religions present in Shenzhen are Buddhism and Taoism. Every district also has Protestant churches, Catholic churches, and mosques. Shenzhen also hosts the headquarters of the Holy Confucian Church, established in 2009.

== See also ==
- Demographics of China
