= Old Hartslog Church =

Coordinates: 40.5695135°N 78.0938958°W

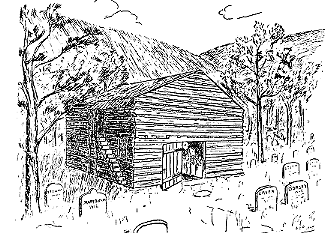
Old Hartslog Church

The Frankstown Path (also known as the Kittanning Path), was the highway for earlier travelers and fur traders in central Pennsylvania. It passed through Harts Log (later Hartslog and then Alexandria) along the Juniata River. The place was first named after a hollow log at the site, which the trader John Hart used between 1744 and 1755 as a feeding trough for his pack horses.

The early Scotch Irish settlers subscribed to raise the money to build a church at the settlement in 1786-87 for the Presbyterian congregation. The result was a log worship house, the Old Hartslog Church, erected upon the hill one mile north of the present site of the town of Alexandria, Pennsylvania. The surrounding church yard was used for a burial ground. The Rev. John Johnston was installed as pastor in November, 1787, and continued in that role until 1823.

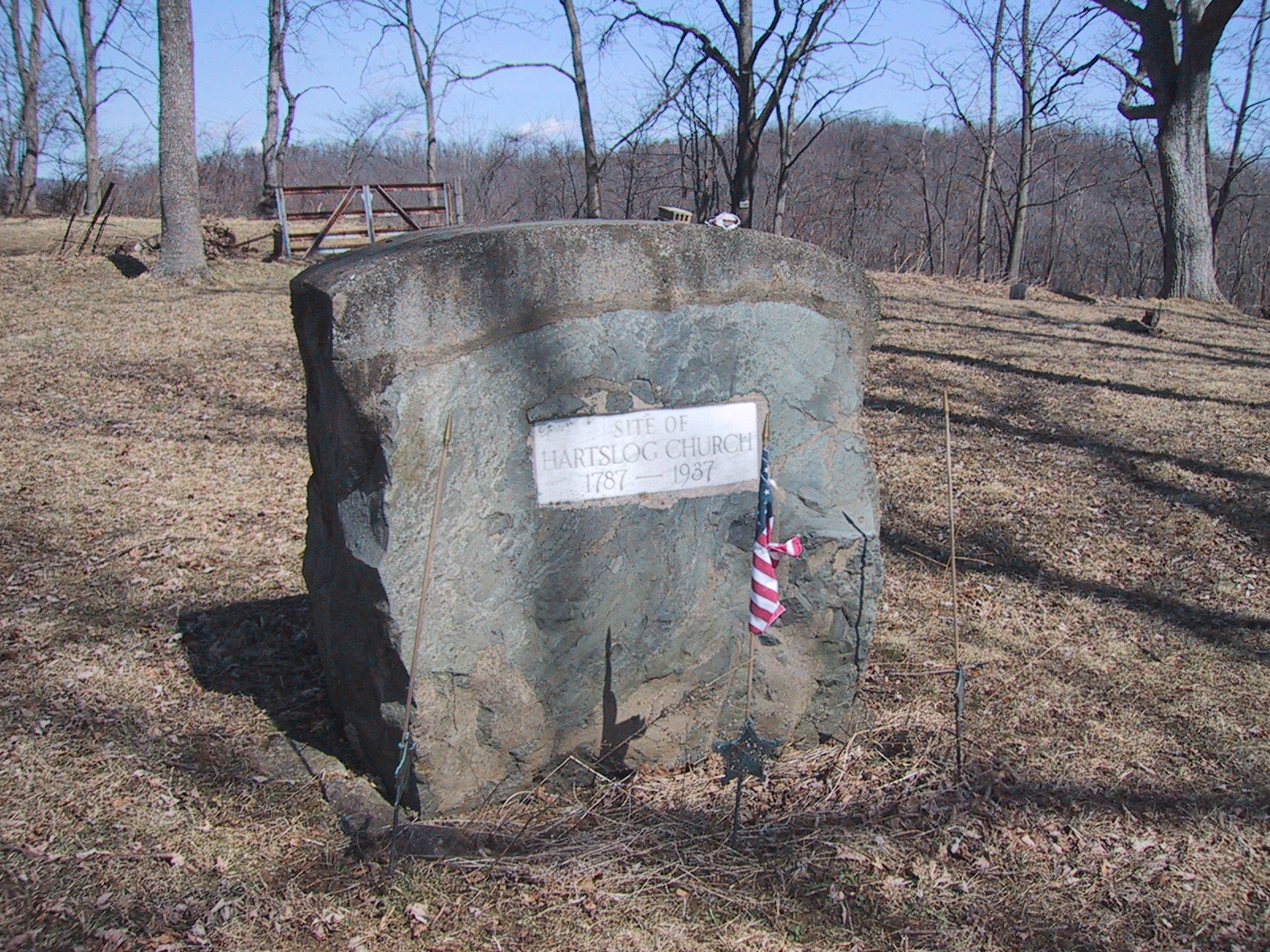
Memorial marking the site of the Old Hartslog Meetinghouse

The first building was a primitive structure, without floor, with split log benches for the worshipers, and without heating facilities. In 1787 a floor was laid, six large windows set in, a large door constructed, and a pulpit and a communion table made. In 1794 it was laid off into four sections, and fitted with pews; which were rented. Each section was 120 square feet, from which we judge that the building was not more than 40 feet square.

In 1826, the old Hartslog congregation moved to a brick building, referred to by Senator John Scott in his memoirs as the "Brick Church", which seems to have been located near to the site of the present Reformed Church. The old Log Worship House was taken down the same year, and some of its logs were used in one or two of the dwellings of Alexandria.

In 1937, the Hartslog Presbyterian Church, now the Alexandria Presbyterian Church, celebrated the Sesqui-Centennial of the original log church, and dedicated a stone marker at the original site to commemorate the event. The marker remains, as do the early gravestones, now largely illegible, still marking the final resting place of those early settlers.

Each year on the second Saturday in October, the early history of the community is celebrated with "Hartslog Day Heritage Festival", where thousands descend upon the small town to sample food, and buy homemade crafts and wares, from stained glass to children's toys, wood works, quilts and more.
