= Shenzhen Christian Church =

- 基督教深圳堂
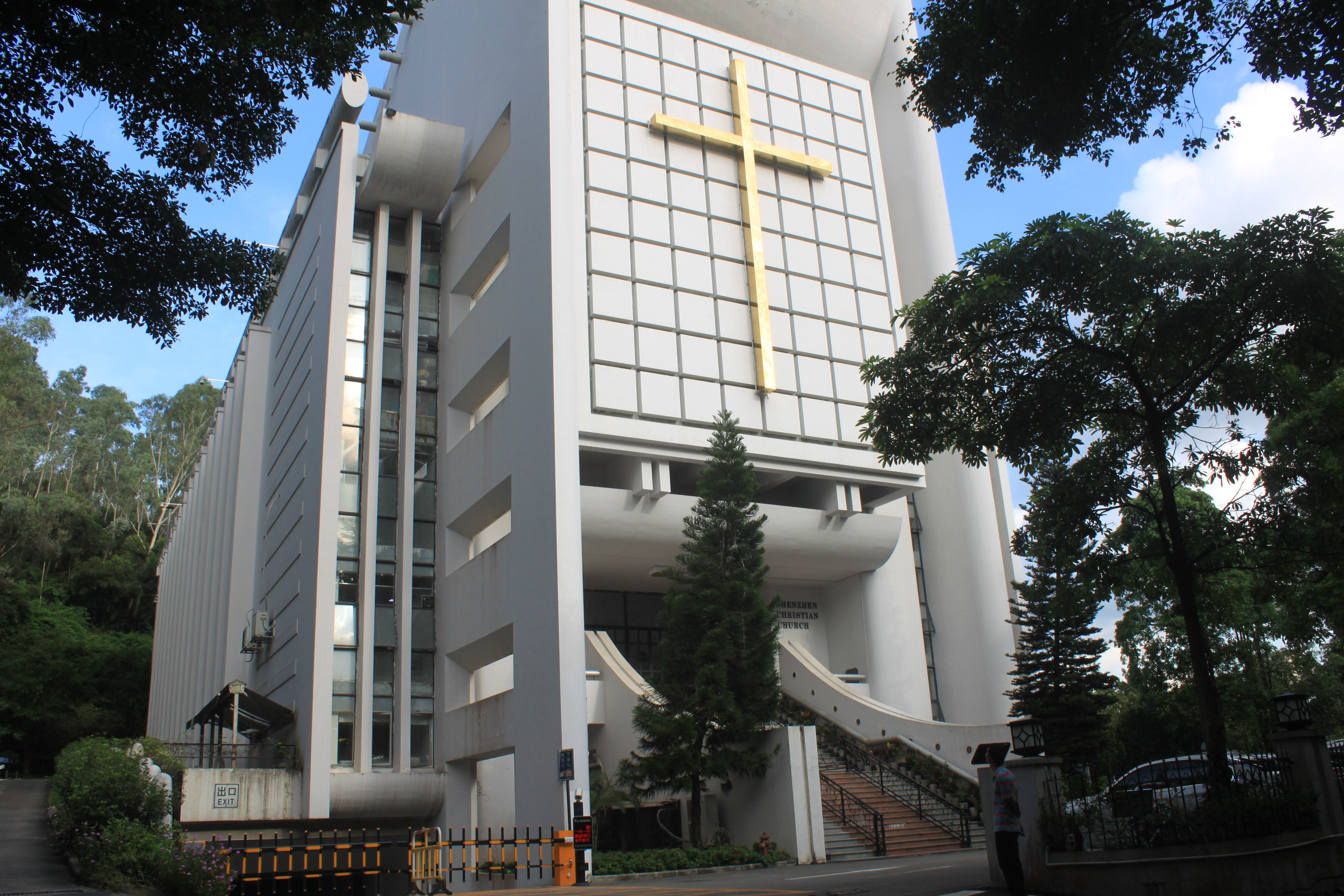
- Shenzhen Christian Church

- Location in Guangdong Shenzhen Christian Church (China)
- 22°34′26.3676″N 114°3′12.258″E
- Location: Futian District, Shenzhen, Guangdong
- Country: China
- Denomination: Protestantism

History
- Status: Parish church
- Founded: 1846

Architecture
- Functional status: Active
- Architectural type: Church building
- Style: Modern
- Years built: 1898
- Groundbreaking: 3 July 1999
- Completed: 9 December 2001
- Construction cost: ¥29 million

Specifications
- Height: 28 m (92 ft)
- Materials: Bricks

Shenzhen Christian Church (Chinese: 基督教深圳堂; pinyin: Jīdūjiào Shēnzhèntáng; Jyutping: gei1 duk1 gaau3 sam1 zan3 tong4) is a Protestant church located in Meilin Road, Futian District, Shenzhen, Guangdong, China.

== History ==
The introduction of Christianity into the Shenzhen area began in 1846, belonging to the Basel Mission and Rhenish Missionary Society. It had established 27 churches and missionaries, mainly concentrated in Bao'an.

The old church was founded in 1898 in Luohu District by the Rhenish Missionary Society and was rebuilt in 1949.

In 1966, the Cultural Revolution was launched by Mao Zedong, it was taken as the office of local government, and the church staff went to home to do farm work and the church was forced to halt all activities.

The church again opened to worship on May 27, 1984, after Deng Xiaoping returned to politics.

In 1998, the Shenzhen government provided a 4,400 m^{2} (0.0017 sq mi) land in Meilin Huaguo Hill (梅林花果山) of Futian District (including green belt) for the new church of construction land. Groundbreaking ceremony was held on July 3, 1999, and was completed in August 2000. The new church was put into use on December 9, 2001. The new church cost 30 million yuan, more than ninety percent of the donations from local believers in Shenzhen. It has an area of 8,265 square metres (2.042 acres) and a height of 28 m (92 ft).

== Parish ==
As of May 2025, the church has five Sunday Services, where the one starting from 19:00 is held in English. Open communion is held on the first Sunday of each month. There are also meetings and fellowships, usually on evenings, from Monday to Saturday.

Classes for new believers (初信班) are held two times every year. Shorter, and more frequent classes leading up to baptism (洗礼班) are held three times every year.

== Transportation ==
- Take subway Line 9 (Meilin Line) to get off at Xiameilin Station, getting out from Exit C and walk to Xiameilin Market Bus Stop (下梅林市场站) to transfer to bus No. 374, 201 or 67 to Meilin Second Village Bus Stop (梅林二村站).
- Take bus No. 30, 35, 44, 45, 60, 67, 201, 207, 240, 242, 324 or 361 to Meilin Second Village Bus Stop (梅林二村站).

== Gallery ==
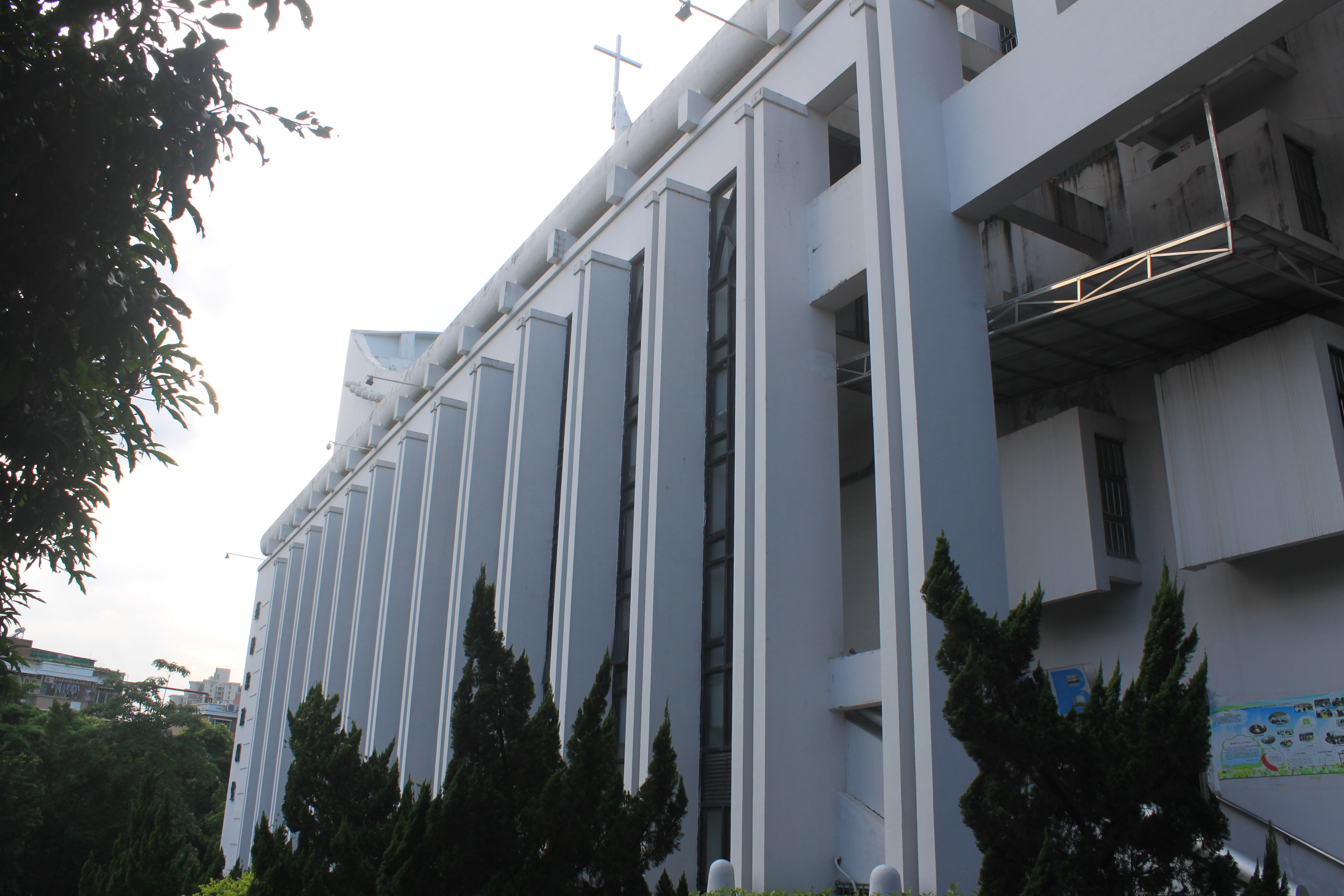

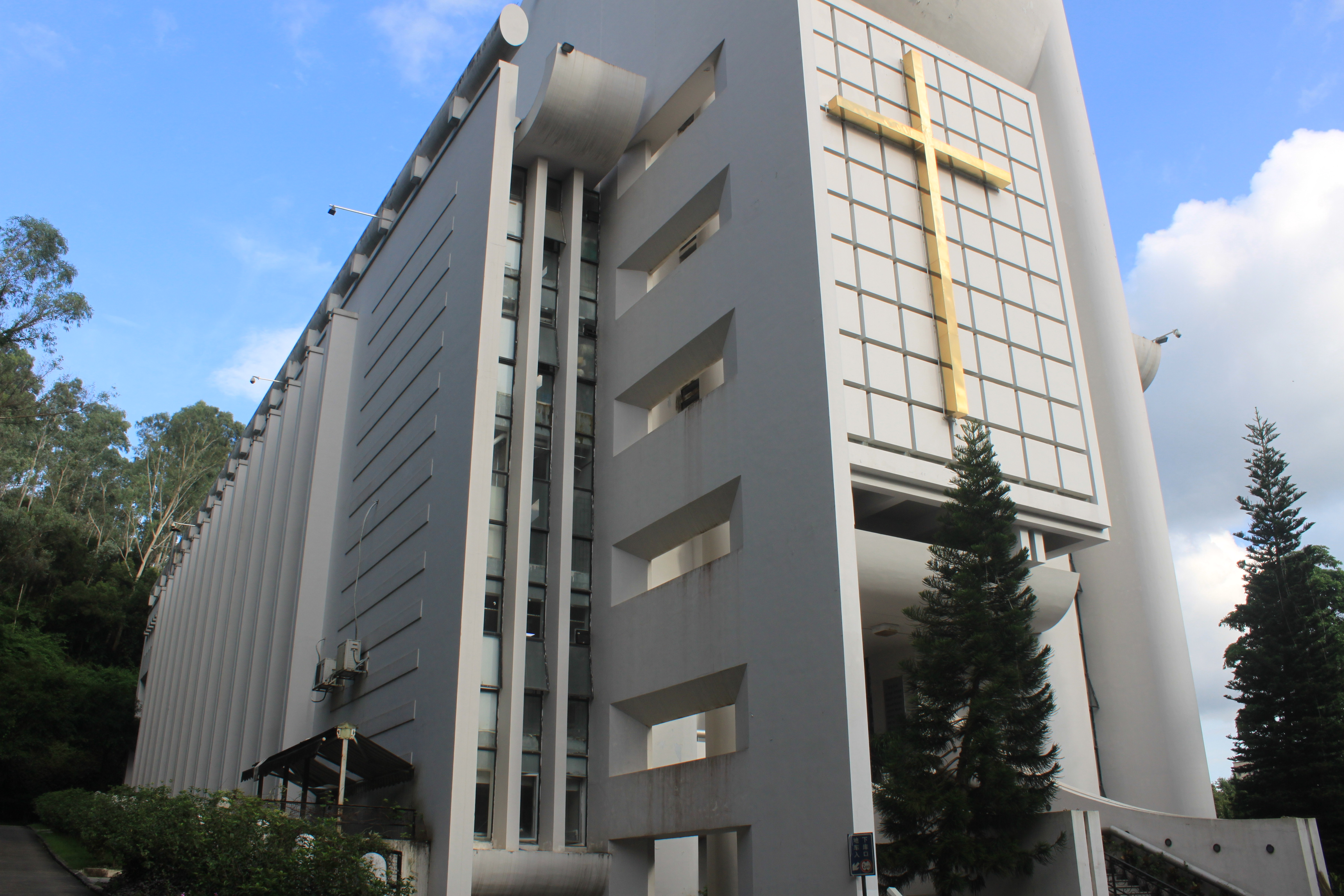

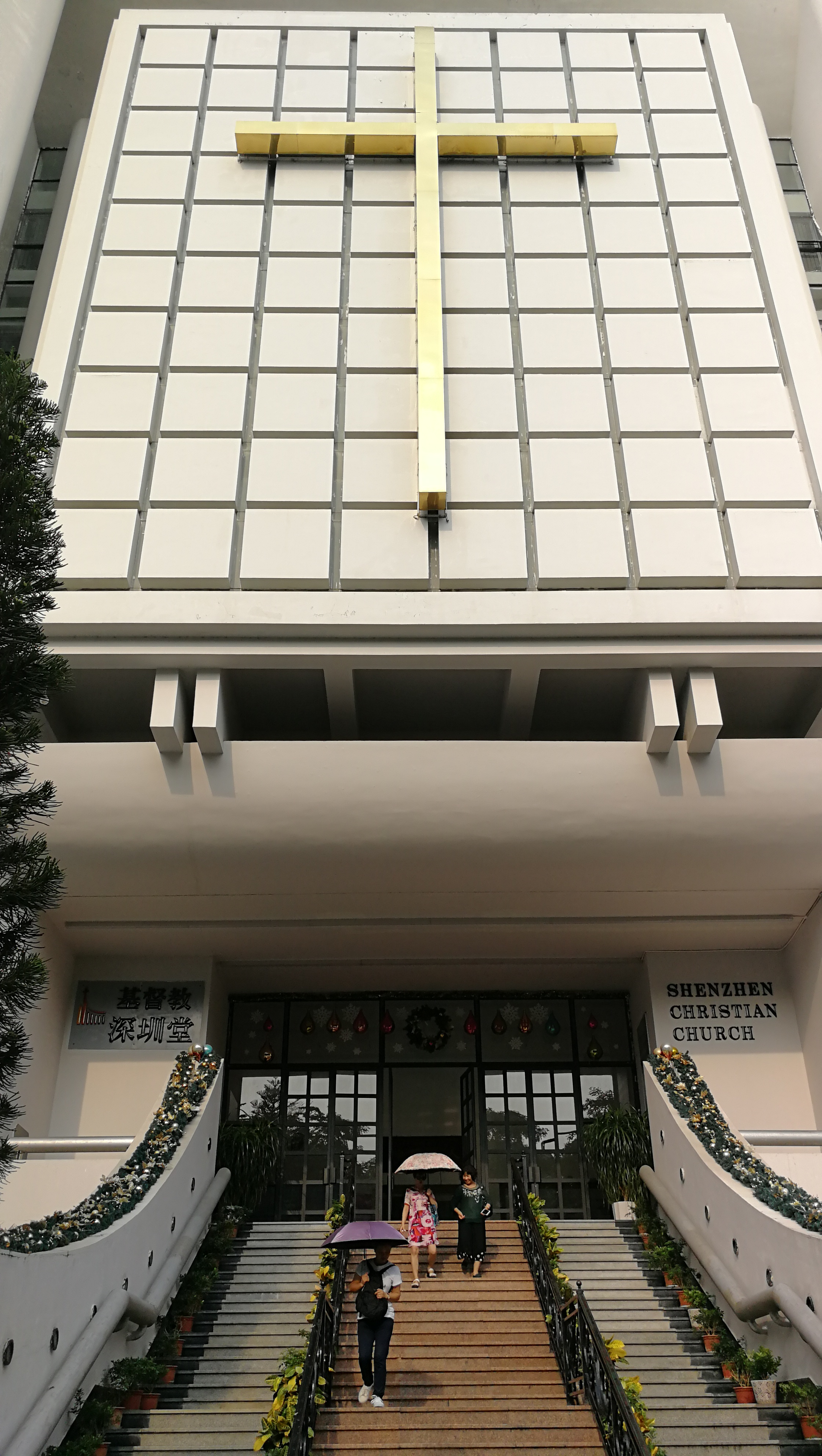
Stairs

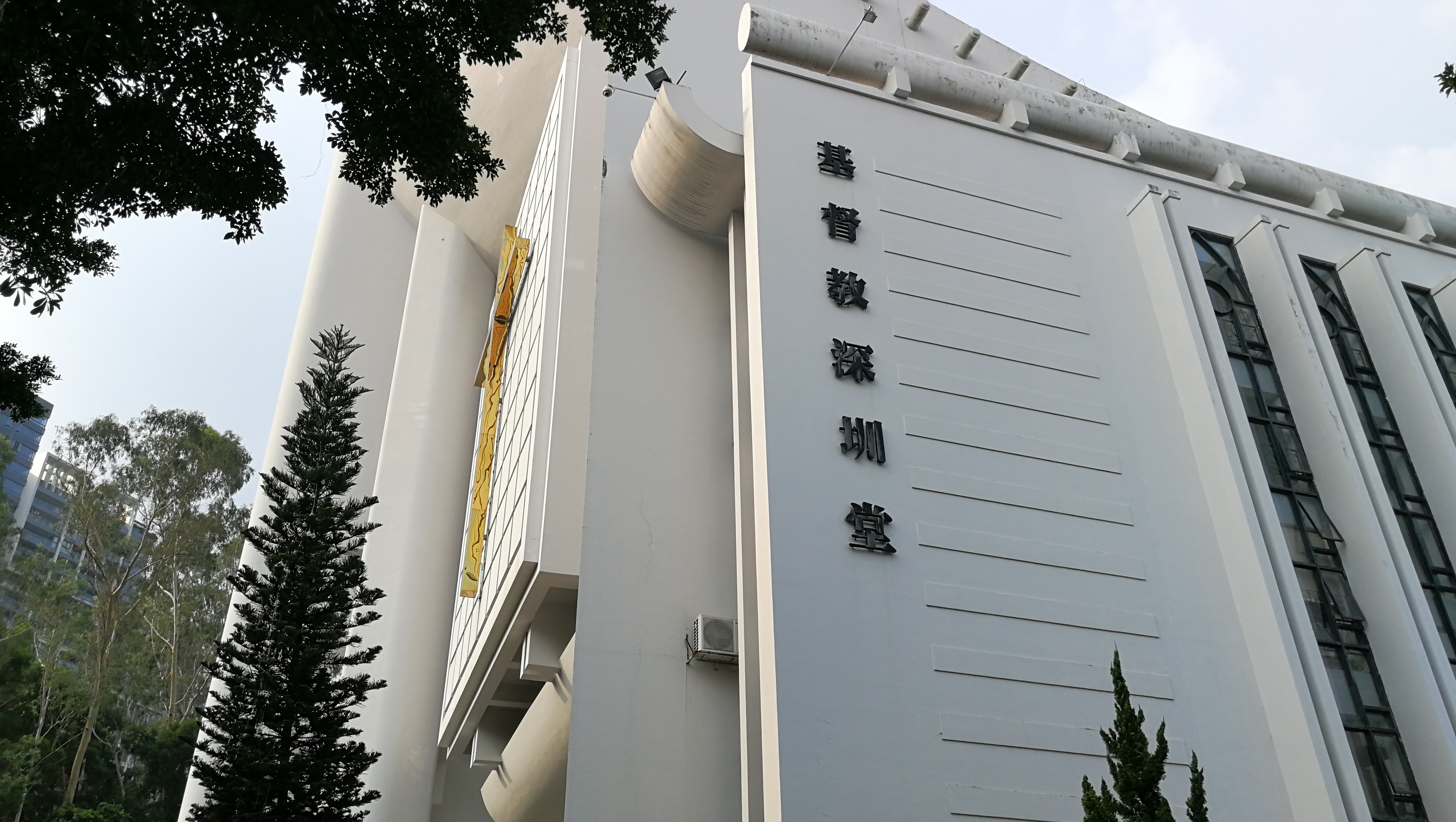
Southwest corner

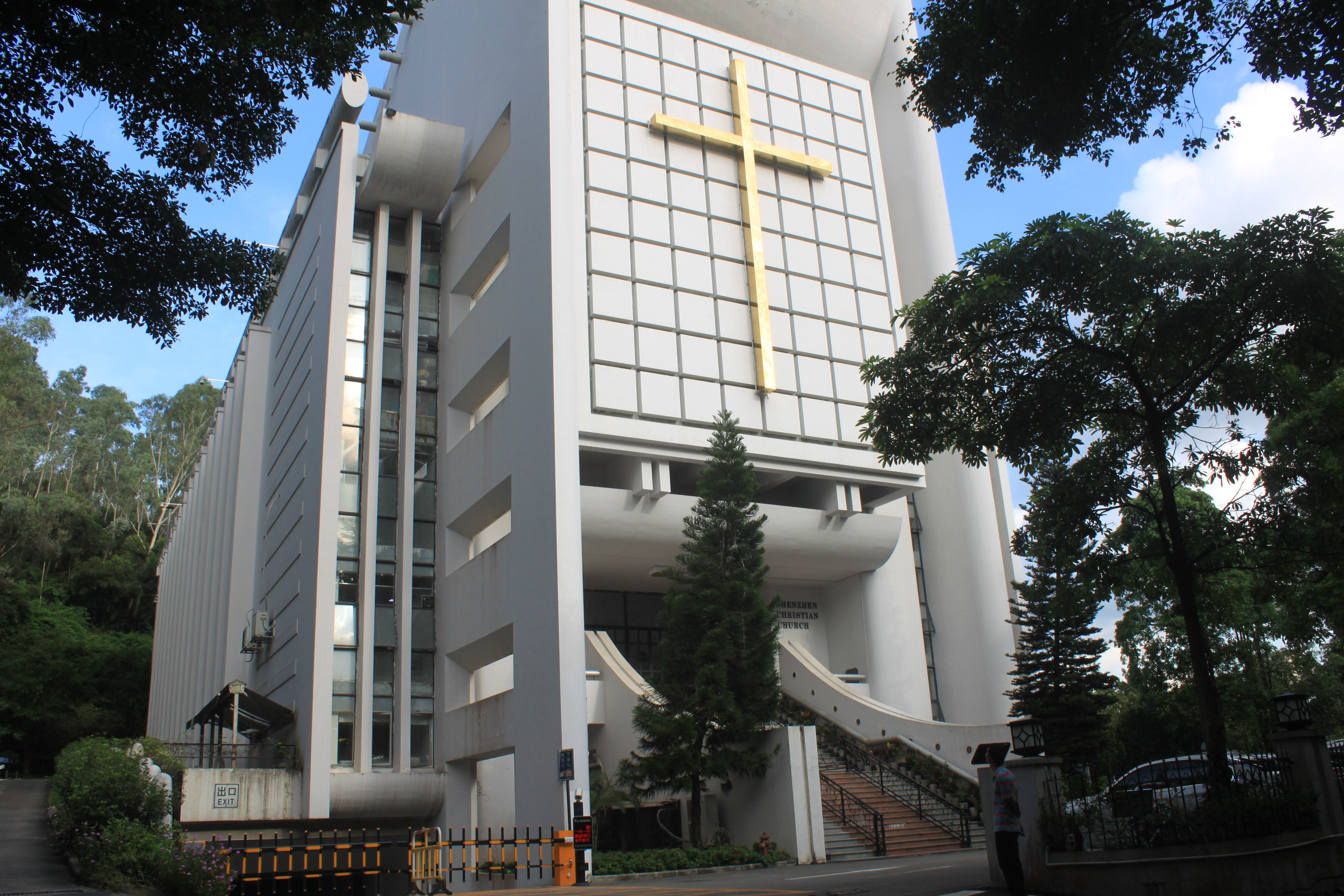
