= Alexandria, Pennsylvania =

Borough in Pennsylvania, US

- Borough
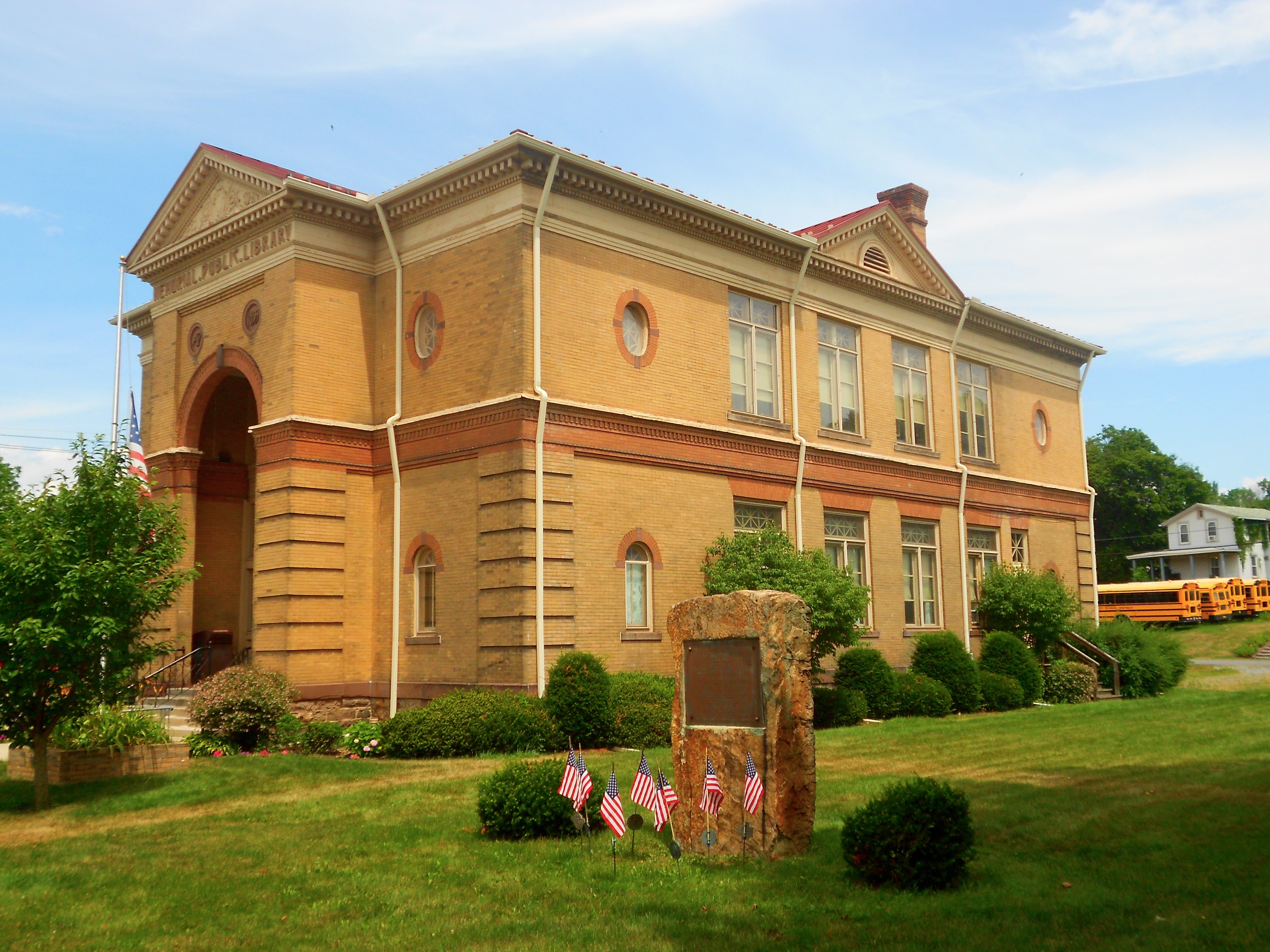
- Library

- Seal

- Location of Alexandria in Huntingdon County, Pennsylvania.

- Location within Pennsylvania Location within the United States
- Coordinates: 40°33′30″N 78°06′00″W
- Country: United States
- State: Pennsylvania
- County: Huntingdon

Government
  - Type: Borough Council

Area
  - Total: 0.11 sq mi (0.29 km^{2})
  - Land: 0.11 sq mi (0.29 km^{2})
  - Water: 0 sq mi (0.00 km^{2})
- Elevation: 705 ft (215 m)

Population (2020)
  - Total: 384
  - Density: 3,378.4/sq mi (1,304.42/km^{2})
- Time zone: UTC-5 (Eastern (EST))
  - Summer (DST): UTC-4 (EDT)
- Zip code: 16611
- Area code: 814
- FIPS code: 42-00756
- GNIS feature ID: 1215264
- Website: alexandriaborough.com

Alexandria is a borough in Huntingdon County, Pennsylvania, United States. The population was 388 at the 2020 census.

== Geography ==
According to the United States Census Bureau, the borough has a total area of 0.1 square miles (0.3 km^{2}), all land.

== Demographics ==
Historical population
| Census | Pop. | Note | %± |
|---|---|---|---|
| 1800 | 138 | | — |
| 1810 | 156 | | 13.0% |
| 1820 | 280 | | 79.5% |
| 1840 | 575 | | — |
| 1850 | 601 | | 4.5% |
| 1860 | 534 | | −11.1% |
| 1870 | 556 | | 4.1% |
| 1880 | 484 | | −12.9% |
| 1890 | 438 | | −9.5% |
| 1900 | 406 | | −7.3% |
| 1910 | 432 | | 6.4% |
| 1920 | 440 | | 1.9% |
| 1930 | 443 | | 0.7% |
| 1940 | 442 | | −0.2% |
| 1950 | 443 | | 0.2% |
| 1960 | 381 | | −14.0% |
| 1970 | 495 | | 29.9% |
| 1980 | 435 | | −12.1% |
| 1990 | 420 | | −3.4% |
| 2000 | 408 | | −2.9% |
| 2010 | 349 | | −14.5% |
| 2020 | 384 | | 10.0% |
| 2021 (est.) | 384 | Steady | 0.0% |

As of the census of 2000, there were 346 people and 139 households within the borough. The population density was 3,460.0 inhabitants per square mile (1,335.9/km^{2}). There were 160 housing units at an average density of 1,580.0 per square mile (610.0/km^{2}). The racial makeup of the borough was 98.55% White, 0.29 African American, 0.29% Asian, 0.29% from other races, and 0.58% from two or more races. Hispanic or Latino of any race were 1.45% of the population.

There were 139 households, out of which 32.4% had children under the age of 18 living with them, 47.0% were married couples living together, 16.1% had a female householder with no husband present, and 28.2% were non-families. 25.5% of all households were made up of individuals, and 10.7% had someone living alone who was 65 years of age or older. The average household size was 2.58 and the average family size was 3.00.

In the borough the population was spread out, with 23.1% under the age of 18, 2.3% from 18 to 19, 4.9% from 20 to 24, 13.9% from 25 to 34, 21.4% from 35 to 49, 19.9% from 50 to 64, and 14.5% who were 65 years of age or older. The median age was 37 years. The population was 49.42% male, and 50.58% female.

== History ==
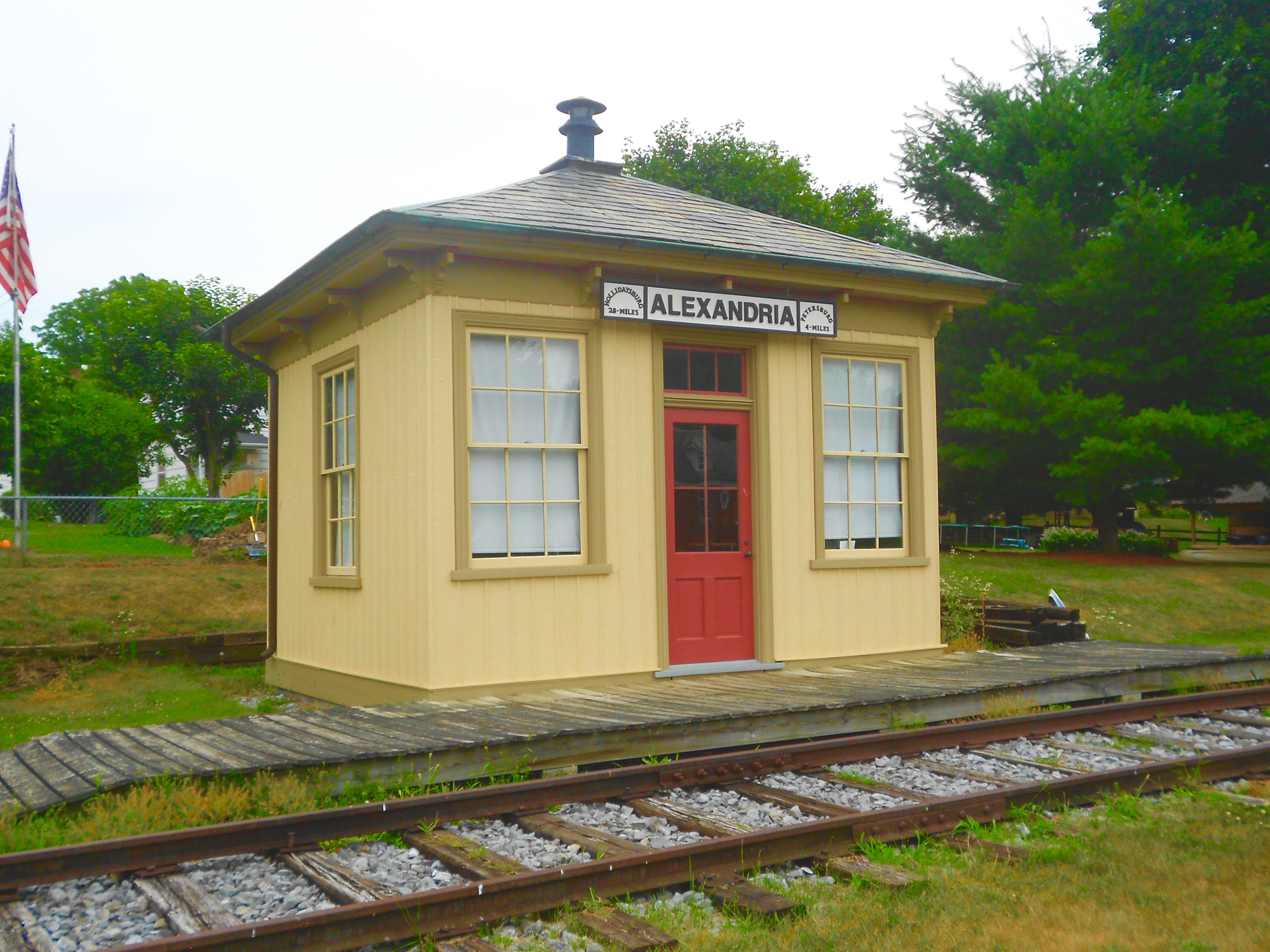
Old railway station

The year 1744 is the first record of John Hart's “logg”, near where Alexandria is located now. During the land purchase of 1755 James Sterrat of Carlisle purchased 400 acres including the sleeping place called John Hart's log on the Juniata River, which is now Alexandria.

Some time in the years before 1785 the first mention of a religious group called Hartslog Presbyterian Congregation was formed. A log worship house, Old Hartslog Church, stood upon the hill one mile (1.6 km) north of the present site of the town of Alexandria, where a burial ground was later made. This was a primitive structure but by 1787 a floor was laid, six large windows set in, a large door constructed, and a pulpit and a communion table made. In 1794 it was laid off into four sections, and fitted with pews. In 1826, the old Hartslog congregation moved to a brick building, referred to by Senator John Scott in his memoirs as the "Brick Church", which seems to have been located near to the site of the present Reformed Church. The old log worship house was taken down the same year, and some of its logs were used in one or two of the dwellings of Alexandria.

In the late 18th century the primary transportation to and from Alexandria was the Juniata River, suitable only during summer and when the water depth permitted. On May 3, 1808, the new road from Harrisburg to Alexandria opened, permitting a more reliable connection with the outside world. In 1833 the Juniata Division of the Pennsylvania Canal was opened, the promise of better transportation started a mini housing boom in Alexandria. By 1875 the canal was abandoned and the Pennsylvania Railroad managed the transportation needs of the area. Around this time the growth of the area slowed, while the populations of Huntingdon and Hollidaysburg grew.

== Hartslog Heritage Day Festival ==
Alexandria hosts the annual "Hartslog Heritage Day" celebration each year on the second Saturday of October. The day-long event recognizes the early days of the small borough, when, in 1744, a licensed Indian trader named John Hart used a large hollowed-out log to feed and salt his horses while he conducted his trading.

Early settlers used this log as a landmark to describe the location of their claims and referred to this area as Hartslog Settlement. In 1793 this area was laid out into town lots and named Alexandria, with the street near the site of the log name Hartslog Street.

Today the name remains for Hartslog Street as well as the region — "Hartslog Valley."

The Hartslog Museum located on the second floor of the library in Alexandria is open one weekend a month and on Hartslog Day. The museum includes artifacts and antiques from the area, when Pennsylvania was still inhabited by Indian tribes.

Hartslog Day helps to support the museum.

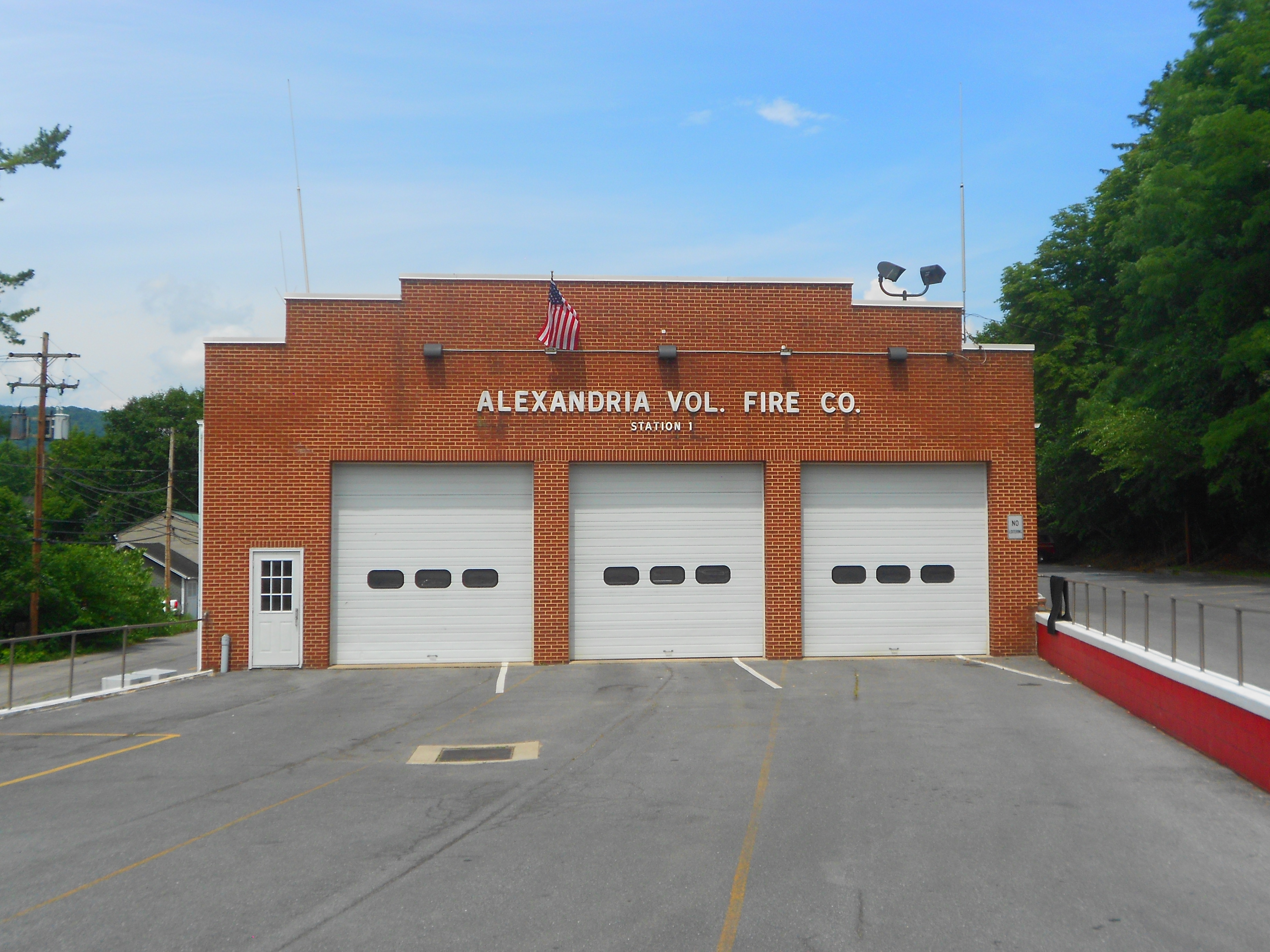
Fire Department

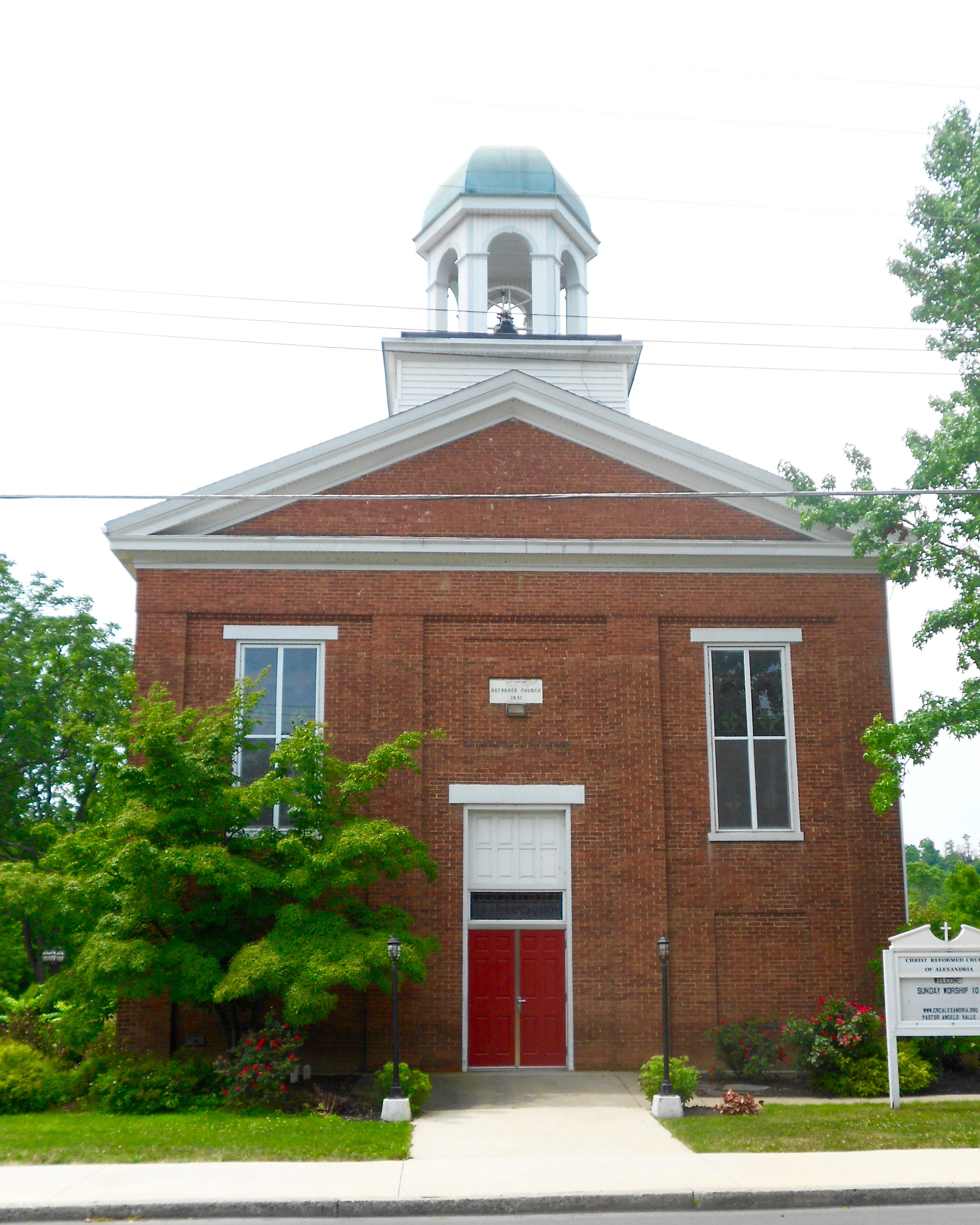
Christ Reformed Church

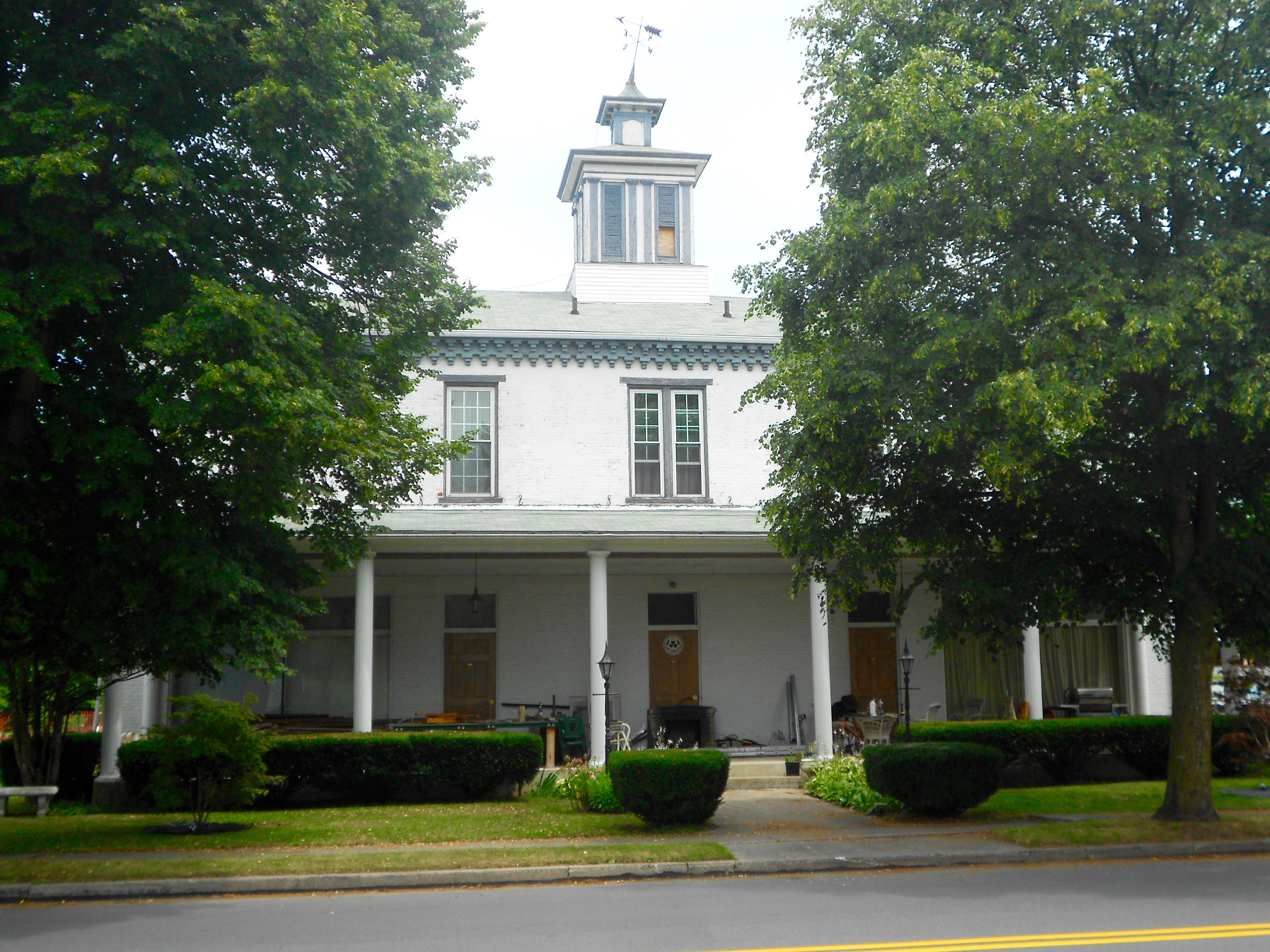
Old hotel on Main Street

== Notable people ==
- George MacPherson Docherty – pastor who helped to get the phrase "Under God" added to the Pledge of Allegiance.
- John Scott, Sr. – Member of the U.S. House of Representatives
- John Scott, Jr. – Member of the United States Senate
