= Hartslog =

The year 1744 is the first record of John Harts's “logg”, near where Alexandria, Pennsylvania is located now. During the land purchase of 1755 James Sterrat of Carlisle purchased 400 acres including the sleeping place called John Hart's log on the Juniata River, which is now Alexandria and named for Indian trader John Hart.
