= Communion table =

Table used in Protestant churches

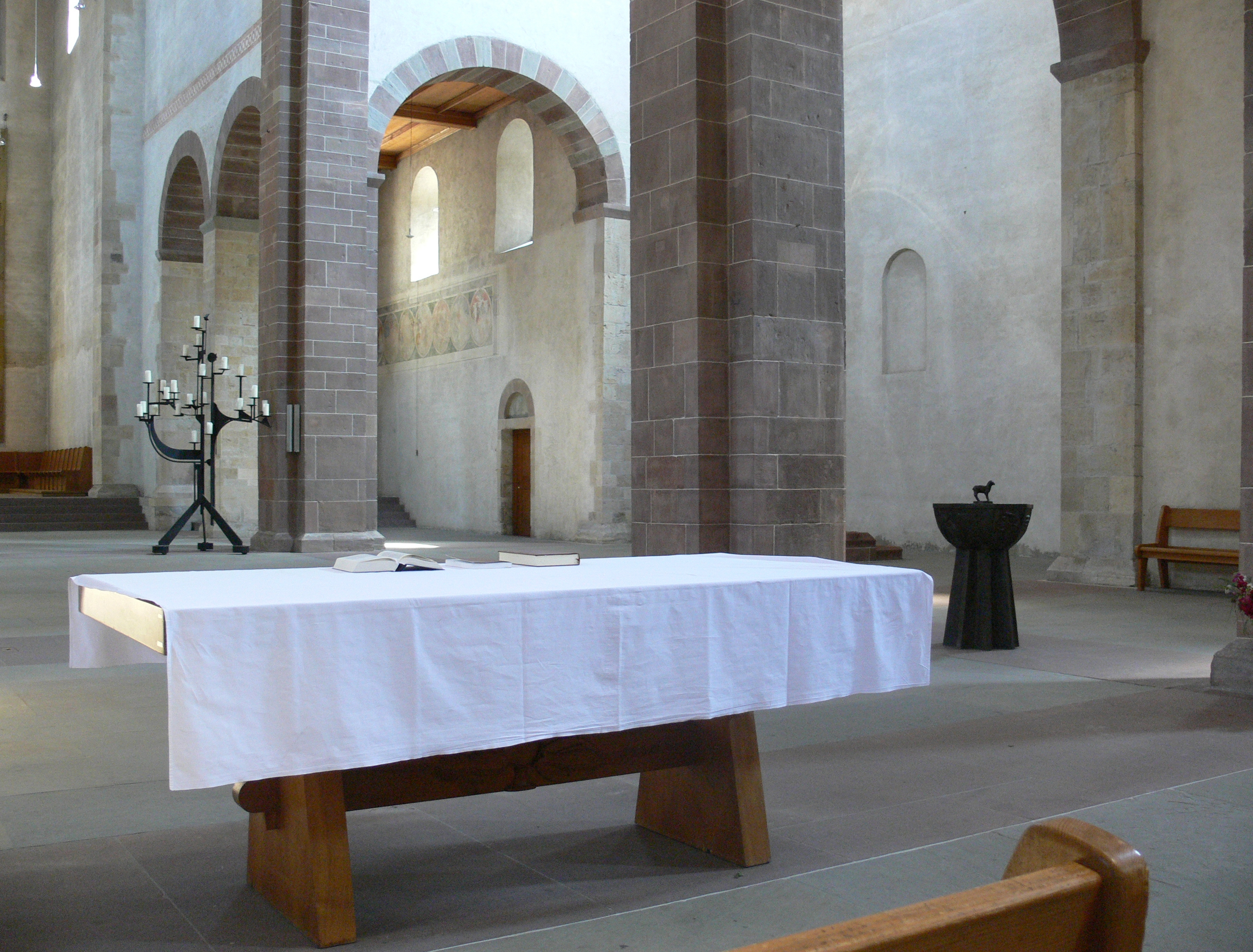
Communion table in the Münster in Schaffhausen, Switzerland.

Communion table and Lord's table are terms used by many Protestant churches—particularly from Reformed, Baptist and low church Anglican and Methodist bodies—for the table used for preparation of Holy Communion (a sacrament also called the Eucharist). These churches typically prefer not to use the term "altar" because they do not see Communion as sacrificial in any way. However, in colloquial speech, the word "altar" is often used interchangeably with "communion table".

== Terminology ==
The use of a simple table, generally built of wood, instead of an altar made of stone reflects these churches' rejection of the suggestion of sacrifice in the rite: they believe that the Passion of Jesus Christ was a perfect sacrifice for sins made once for all (Hebrews 9:25-10:4).

Many Protestant churches that choose not to use the term "altar" may still have an "altar call", in which visitors who wish to make a new spiritual commitment to Jesus Christ are invited to come forward to the front of the church.

Having or not having a Communion table was a subject of dispute within Scottish Presbyterianism in the 17th century, with the Independents opposing its use.

While some Methodists use the term "altar", the United Methodist Church states, "[s]trictly speaking, United Methodists do not have an altar", because Methodists do not celebrate mass. It advises that the traditional terms are "Lord's table" and "Communion table" for the table upon which the bread and wine are placed during Holy Communion.

== Location and adornment ==
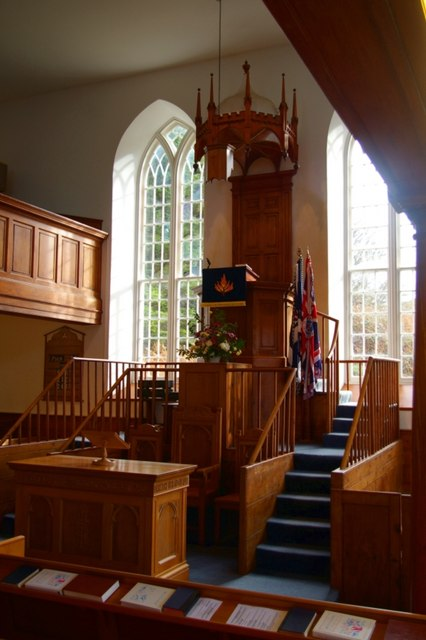
This Presbyterian church in Duirinish, Skye has a small Communion table in front of a prominent pulpit, illustrating the church's dual ministry of Word and Sacrament.

The table may be very simple, adorned perhaps with only a linen cloth, or with an open Bible or some receptacle to collect an offering. In modern use many Protestants adorn their tables with candles, though the use of candles was historically rejected among some Protestants. Some Communion tables bear the inscription Do This in Remembrance of Me from the Last Supper (Luke 22:19, 1 Corinthians 11:24) or the words Holy, Holy, Holy.

Such a table may be temporary, being moved into place when there is a Communion Service, but generally holds a permanent (or semi-permanent) position of some prominence in the worship space. Instead of a high altar, the sanctuary may be dominated only by a large, centralized pulpit.

Some bring in a Communion table only when needed. For example, St Andrew's Anglican Cathedral in Sydney does not have a prominent Communion table. The strongly Evangelical church leadership decided that the table should be placed in a more forward position in the chancel and that it should be easily portable so that it might be removed when not required for Holy Communion, to clear a space for presentations and musical performances.
