= American Catholic Church in the United States =

Independent Catholic church

- Classification: Independent Old Catholic
- Governance: Mixture of episcopal and congregational polity
- Founder: Lawrence J. Harms
- Origin: 1999; Frederick, Maryland
- Clergy: 20
- Website: accus.us

The American Catholic Church in the United States (ACCUS) is an Independent Old Catholic church primarily in the United States, founded in 1999 by Lawrence J. Harms in Frederick, Maryland. The ACCUS claims apostolic succession through Carlos Duarte Costa. As of 2018, the ACCUS was composed of 1 bishop, 15 priests, and 3 deacons in 13 U.S. states.

== Doctrine ==
The American Catholic Church in the United States states that it adheres to the doctrine of Second Vatican Council. It celebrates seven sacraments: baptism, confirmation, communion, reconciliation, anointing of the sick, holy orders and matrimony; and believes the sacrament of marriage can be celebrated for same-sex couples.
