= Communicatio in sacris =

Concept in Catholic liturgy

In the Catholic Church, communicatio in sacris ("communion in sacred [things]"; also translated as "worship in common"), also called communicatio in divinis ("communion in divine [things]") or communicatio in ritibus ("communion in rites"), designates the regulations for the partaking of a Catholic person to a non-Catholic sacrament or liturgical celebration, or for the partaking of a non-Catholic person to a Catholic sacrament or liturgical celebration. The expression is also used to refer to said acts of partaking themselves.

Communicatio in sacris is legislated mainly by two canons: canon 844 of the 1983 Code of Canon Law, and canon 671 of the Code of Canons of the Eastern Churches.

== Canon 844 ==
Canon 844 is a canon contained within the 1983 Code of Canon Law (1983 CIC) of the Catholic Church, (Note: The canons pertain only to the Latin Church. The parallel law which pertains to the other sui iuris Churches which collectively make up the Eastern Catholic Churches in the Catholic Church is Canon 671 contained within the Code of Canons of the Eastern Churches.) which defines the licit administration and reception of certain sacraments of the Catholic Church in normative and in particular exceptional circumstances, known in Catholic canonical theory as communicatio in sacris.

Thomas Condon wrote that this canon "empowers the bishop to regulate sacramental sharing for Catholics who might need to approach a non-Catholic minister; [...] the canon enjoins the bishop to prevent a spirit of indifferentism from emerging because of sacramental sharing". Condon wrote that Frederick R. McManus "noted that 'the intent of the canon is clear, namely to define the outer limits of permissible sharing of sacraments, aside from any question of validity or invalidity'". The Second Vatican Council's decree on ecumenism, Unitatis Redintegratio (UR), states that "worship in common (communicatio in sacris) is not to be considered as a means to be used indiscriminately for the restoration of Christian unity". In that context, John Beal et al.'s New commentary on the Code of Canon Law notes that this canon does not address the specific question of "the seriousness of the need" on occasions of worship in common such as a marriage or funeral or similar ecumenical activities, though individual Catholic theologians, such as Kevin Considine, have interpreted canon 844 as allowing for intercommunion in these cases.

=== Structure ===
The structure of canon 844 is that the "general principle is established" first, then this canon "considers three situations of facts" which are exceptions, and finally this canon "regulates the lawful exercise of the normative activity in a particular area".

In Ecclesia de Eucharistia (EE), Pope John Paul II asked the Roman Curia "to prepare a more specific document, including prescriptions of a juridical nature", which Daniel Merz wrote, in The Liturgy Documents, were "in light of liturgical abuses in violation of liturgical norms". Within several months, in 2004, the Congregation for Divine Worship and the Discipline of the Sacraments (CCDDS) gave those instructions in Redemptionis Sacramentum (RS). Merz made clear that RS "should be understood as binding norms for interpreting and carrying out the liturgical laws" and "is intended to be read as a companion to" EE. The instruction, in RS pertaining to this canon, is that "Catholic ministers licitly administer the Sacraments only to the Catholic faithful, who likewise receive them licitly only from Catholic ministers, except for those situations for which provision is made in" canon 844 §§2–4, and Canon 861 §2. (Note: According to RS, see 1983 CIC, n. 844 §1; EE, nn. 45-46; 1993 ED, nn. 130-131.) Furthermore, "the conditions comprising" canon 844 §4, "from which no dispensation can be given, (Note: According to RS, see EE, n. 46.) cannot be separated; thus, it is necessary that all of these conditions be present together".

==== Principle ====
The principle found in section one of canon 844 is that "Catholic ministers administer the sacraments licitly to Catholic members of the Christian faithful alone". "Paragraph one governs the licit, rather than the valid administration of sacraments to Catholics", according to Condon. This principle covers all sacraments of the Catholic Church. "The general principle is clear" as Caparros et al. describes that "Catholic ministers may lawfully administer the sacraments to Catholic faithful, who in their turn may only receive them lawfully from Catholic ministers".

==== Exception one ====
The first exception is cited in section one. Baptism, according to the 1983 CIC, "is necessary for salvation" and is "the gateway to the sacraments"; through it, the recipient is "configured to Christ" by a sacramental character and "incorporated into the Church". The first exception to canon 844 is that if "an ordinary minister is absent or impeded, a catechist or another person designated for this function by the local ordinary, or in a case of necessity any person with the right intention, confers baptism licitly". (Note: Baptism "is validly conferred only by a washing of true water with the proper form of words." For the essential rite of the sacrament see Catechism of the Catholic Church (2nd ed.). Libreria Editrice Vaticana. 2019. Paragraphs 1239–1240.) So, for the §1 exception all of these conditions must be present together for licitness:

- A case of necessity. (Note: In case of "danger of death" specifically, other canons state that, an infant recipient "of Catholic parents or even of non-Catholic parents is baptized licitly [...] even against the will of the parents" and "without delay;" while an adult recipient in such a case "can be baptized if, having some knowledge of the principal truths of the faith, the person has manifested in any way at all the intention to receive baptism and promises to observe the commandments of the Christian religion.")
- Any administrant, whether Catholic or non-Catholic or non-Christian, with the right intention.
- Any recipient who is "not yet baptized".
- Only for reception of the sacrament of Christian baptism.

==== Exception two ====
The second exception is found in section two. "Whenever necessity requires it or true spiritual advantage suggests it, and provided that danger of error or of indifferentism is avoided, the Christian faithful for whom it is physically or morally impossible to approach a Catholic minister are permitted to receive the sacraments of penance, Eucharist, and anointing of the sick from non-Catholic ministers in whose Churches these sacraments are valid". (Note: See Catechism of the Catholic Church (2nd ed.). Libreria Editrice Vaticana. 2019. Paragraph 1400.)

"The most important document that clarifies the mind and intention of the legislator", wrote Vere, is the Pontifical Council for Promoting Christian Unity's (PCPCU) Directory for the application of principles and norms on ecumenism (1993 ED) which contains "parallel laws" that "clarify the intention of the legislator with regards to" this canon. So, for the §2 exception all of these conditions must be present together for licitness:

- A case of necessity, (Note: In case of "danger of death" specifically, a different canon states that, a priest without the faculty to hear confessions "absolves validly and licitly any penitents whatsoever [...] from any censures and sins, even if an approved priest is present." In case of "danger of death" specifically, the 1993 ED states that a Catholic recipient "may ask for" penance, Eucharist, and anointing of the sick "only from a minister in whose Church these sacraments are valid or from one who is known to be validly ordained according to the Catholic teaching on ordination.") or a case of true spiritual advantage. Caparros et al. quoting from In quibus rerum circumstantiis remarked that, "It must be remembered that the sacraments 'are not mere instruments for satisfying individual desires only'". (Note: The Caparros et al. commentary is an English language translation of a Spanish language edition. The published English language translation of the quoted excerpt is "far from being simply a means of satisfying exclusively personal aspirations")
- The minister is of a non-Catholic Eastern Church in which these sacraments are valid, or the minister is of a non-Catholic Western Church in which these sacraments are valid or "who is known to be validly ordained according to the Catholic teaching on ordination". The Catholic Church does not recognize the ordination of women, and believes specifically that Anglican ordinations are invalid.
- Error and indifferentism are avoided. Caparros et al. comments that, "this is a basic criterion, expressed in OE 26" which states that participation in worship "which harms the unity of the Church or involves formal acceptance of error or the danger of aberration in the faith, of scandal and indifferentism, is forbidden". In cases of doubt, the recipient should seek references elsewhere. A Catholic recipient who manifests indifference could not apply the provisions of this canon to licitly receive a sacrament from a non-Catholic minister.
- The recipient is Catholic for whom access to a Catholic minister is physically or morally impossible. Beal et al. recognized this to include a limitation "such as serious inconvenience".
- Only for reception of three sacraments: Penance, Eucharist, and Anointing of the Sick.
- Within the prescribed limits regulated by the diocesan bishop and conference of bishops. So to licitly apply the provisions of canon 844 § 2, a Catholic recipient must, if possible, contact the Catholic diocese in which the sacrament might potentially be received, to understand the established norms and prohibitions of the diocesan bishop as well as about specific heretical or schismatic groups and ministers that may be operating in the area. If there is a prohibition, a Catholic recipient engaged in it could be "guilty of prohibited participation in sacred rites (communicatio in sacris)".
- Practiced according to the norm that a recipient "who legitimately wishes to communicate with Eastern Christians must respect the Eastern discipline as much as possible and refrain from communicating if that Church restricts sacramental communion to its own members to the exclusion of others".

==== Exception three ====
The third exception is found in section three. "Catholic ministers administer the sacraments of penance, Eucharist, and anointing of the sick licitly to members of Eastern Churches which do not have full communion with the Catholic Church if they seek such on their own accord and are properly disposed. This is also valid for members of other Churches which in the judgment of the Apostolic See are in the same condition in regard to the sacraments as these Eastern Churches". (Note: See Catechism of the Catholic Church (2nd ed.). Libreria Editrice Vaticana. 2019. Paragraph 1399.) So, for the §3 exception all of these conditions must be present together for licitness:

- A case when the sacrament is requested. Caparros et al. comments that, "any prior pressure by the Catholic minister is clearly forbidden".
- The minister is Catholic.
- The recipient is a baptized properly disposed Eastern non-Catholic. Caparros et al. elucidates that, because "the word Oriental is very general, it is advisable to verify in each case that the subject fulfills the faith requirements laid down by ecclesiastical authority. This applies with equal strictness to members of other Churches that, in the opinion of the" Apostolic See, "are in a similar situation to the Oriental ones". In the United States, this includes Christians of the Eastern Orthodox Churches, the Assyrian Church of the East, and the Polish National Catholic Church.
- Only for reception of three sacraments: penance, Eucharist, and anointing of the sick.
- Within the prescribed limits regulated by the diocesan bishop and conference of bishops.
- Practiced according to the norm that "due consideration should be given to the discipline of the Eastern Churches for their own faithful".
- Practiced according to the norm that "any suggestion of proselytism should be avoided".

==== Exception four ====
The fourth exception is found in section four. "If the danger of death is present or if, in the judgment of the diocesan bishop or conference of bishops, some other grave necessity urges it, Catholic ministers administer these same sacraments licitly also to other Christians not having full communion with the Catholic Church, who cannot approach a minister of their own community and who seek such on their own accord, provided that they manifest Catholic faith in respect to these sacraments and are properly disposed". (Note: See Catechism of the Catholic Church (2nd ed.). Libreria Editrice Vaticana. 2019. Paragraph 1401.) So, for the §4 exception all of these conditions must be present together for licitness:

- A case of a danger of death, or

a case of a grave necessity, in the judgment of the diocesan bishop or conference of bishops.

- The minister is Catholic who "will judge individual cases and administer these sacraments only in accord with [...] established norms, where they exist" or "the norms of" 1993 ED.
- The recipient is a baptized properly disposed Western non-Catholic with "manifest Catholic faith in this sacrament".
- Only for reception of three sacraments: penance, Eucharist, and anointing of the sick.
- Within the prescribed limits regulated by the diocesan bishop and conference of bishops.
- Practiced according to the norm that the recipient is "unable to have recourse for the sacrament desired to a minister of his or her own Church or ecclesial Community".
- Practiced according to the norm that the recipient "ask for the sacrament of his or her own initiative".

==== Regulation ====
The regulation is found in section five. "For the cases mentioned in §§2, 3, and 4, the diocesan bishop or conference of bishops is not to issue general norms except after consultation at least with the local competent authority of the interested non-Catholic Church or community". 1993 ED states that "it is strongly recommended that the diocesan Bishop, taking into account any norms which may have been established for this matter by the Episcopal Conference or by the Synods of Eastern Catholic Churches, establish general norms for judging situations of grave and pressing need and for verifying the conditions" Beal et al. elaborated that in consideration of the ethic of reciprocity, "the underlying purpose" in §5 is "not to act unilaterally" but the language "is carefully constructed to leave the diocesan bishop" or conference of bishops "free to act in individual cases" or issue norms regardless of any consultation with another Church or Ecclesial Community. "The course to be adopted, with due regard to all the circumstances of time, place, and persons", UR states, "is to be decided by local episcopal authority, unless otherwise provided for by the Bishops' Conference according to its statutes, or by the Holy See".

== See also ==
- Canon 915
