= American National Catholic Church =

Christian denomination (since 2009)

- Type: Independent Catholic
- Classification: Old Catholic
- Theology: Trinitarianism, Catholic Theology (Partially), Women's ordination
- Governance: Mixture of episcopal and congregational polity
- Head: Bishop George R. Lucey, FCM
- Founder: Bishop George R. Lucey, FCM
- Origin: 2009; Glen Ridge, New Jersey, U.S.
- Separated from: Catholic Church
- Congregations: 12
- Members: ~2,000
- Clergy: 1 bishop 19 priests
- Website: www.americannationalcatholicchurch.org

The American National Catholic Church (ANCC) is an Independent Old Catholic church established in 2009. The ANCC was founded with the mission of fully implementing its interpretation of the Second Vatican Council and is notably more liberal than the Roman Catholic Church in its acceptance of married clergy, homosexuality, same-sex marriage, the ordination of women, and use of contraception.

== Polity and beliefs ==
The ANCC rejects significant parts of the entire Roman Catholic deposit of faith; it diverges from Roman Catholics regarding the ordination of women and in the realm of sexual morality. It does, however, hold belief in the Trinity, a form of apostolic succession, the salvific act of Christ, the economy of salvation, Mariology, and the number of sacraments. Although regarding itself as a contemporary expression of an ancient faith, it departs in many ways from the Roman Catholic Church. While it respects the Bishop of Rome, considering him "first among equals", it does not acknowledge his primacy or infallibility.

Since its founding in 2009, the ANCC has embraced a path of intentional growth in recognition that many other Independent Catholic jurisdictions failed because they concentrated on quantity at the expense of quality. The early stages of the Church's development focused, consequently, on establishing a strong foundation and solid infrastructure, both aimed at ensuring the Church's future. The American National Catholic Church states that it measures its growth in terms of four general aims:

- to further the work of the Gospel of Jesus Christ by proclaiming the presence of the Kingdom;
- to support missionary work;
- to be involved in the planting and strengthening of local churches; and
- to edify and strengthen believers through Christian fellowship, the liturgical celebrations of the seven sacraments, and the ministry of the Word of God.

The ANCC is congregational rather than hierarchical.

The ANCC allows qualified women and gay persons to receive holy orders. Believing that the lived experience of married life can be an invaluable gift for ministry, the ANCC also welcomes married clergy. The ANCC recognizes same-sex marriage.

== Clergy training ==
All clergy receive comprehensive theological training. After providing certificates of baptism and confirmation (and in the case of persons previously ordained, ordination), applicants must submit a detailed personal narrative, provide professional and personal references, and undergo exhaustive interviews with vocation/formation staff. Applicants must attend an ANCC retreat during which they are further evaluated. Applicants previously ordained in other Christian churches must complete a pastoral internship and a diaconate assignment of one year, after which an additional two-year discernment period is imposed before full incorporation into the ANCC. Only two percent of applicants are selected to study for the priesthood or for incardination.

The Church's clergy possess numerous degrees from institutions of higher learning as well as degrees from accredited seminary programs from various universities. Candidates for ordination to the diaconate and priesthood receive a rigorous, comprehensive, academic and practical education. Criminal background checks and psychological evaluations are required of all applicants. In 2010 the Church founded its own seminary, St. John the Beloved Seminary, offering non-residential theological studies for those pursuing the priesthood. As of 2015 there were three ANCC seminarians there.
