= Church of Our Lady Star of the Sea (Staten Island) =

Catholic parish church in New York City

Coordinates: 40°31′57.79″N 74°11′28.16″W

- Interactive map of the Church of Our Lady Star of the Sea area

General information
- Location: New York City, United States of America
- Client: Roman Catholic Archdiocese of New York

The Church of Our Lady Star of the Sea is a Catholic parish church in the Archdiocese of New York, located at 5371 Amboy Road, Staten Island, New York City. It was established in 1935 as a former mission of Our Lady Help of Christians.

The current church building was deadicated on June 26, 2010 by Archbishop Timothy Dolan. The church seats 1,110 and replaced 1982 church that sat 500. The church won the American Institute of Architects Westchester + Hudson Valley Institutional Citation award in 2010.
