= St. Rita's Church (Staten Island) =

Church building in New York, US

Coordinates: 40°36′15.82″N 74°7′52.49″W

The Church of St. Rita
- Interactive map of the The Church of St. Rita area

General information
- Location: Staten Island, New York, United States of America
- Client: Roman Catholic Archdiocese of New York

St. Rita's Church is a parish church governed by the Roman Catholic Archdiocese of New York, in Staten Island, New York City, founded in 1921. Named for the same saint, the Bronx parish of St. Rita of Cascia was established in 1900.
