= List of churches in the Archdiocese of New York =

This is a list of Catholic churches in the Archdiocese of New York, which encompasses the boroughs of Manhattan, the Bronx, and Staten Island in New York City, as well as Dutchess, Orange, Putnam, Rockland, Sullivan, Ulster, and Westchester counties in the Hudson Valley region of New York State.

== Active churches in the archdiocese ==
This is a list of all the active Latin Church and Eastern Catholic churches in the Archdiocese of New York. In 2014, Archbishop Timothy Dolan announced the merger of Catholic 113 parishes in the archdiocese, with 31 churches permanently closing. The list includes individual churches that were merged into new parishes or were closed as a result of the 2014 mergers. This list was completely updated in 2024.

=== Latin churches in New York City ===
This is a list of Catholic churches in the Bronx, Manhattan, and Staten Island. The churches in Brooklyn and Queens belong to the Diocese of Brooklyn.

==== Churches in the Bronx ====
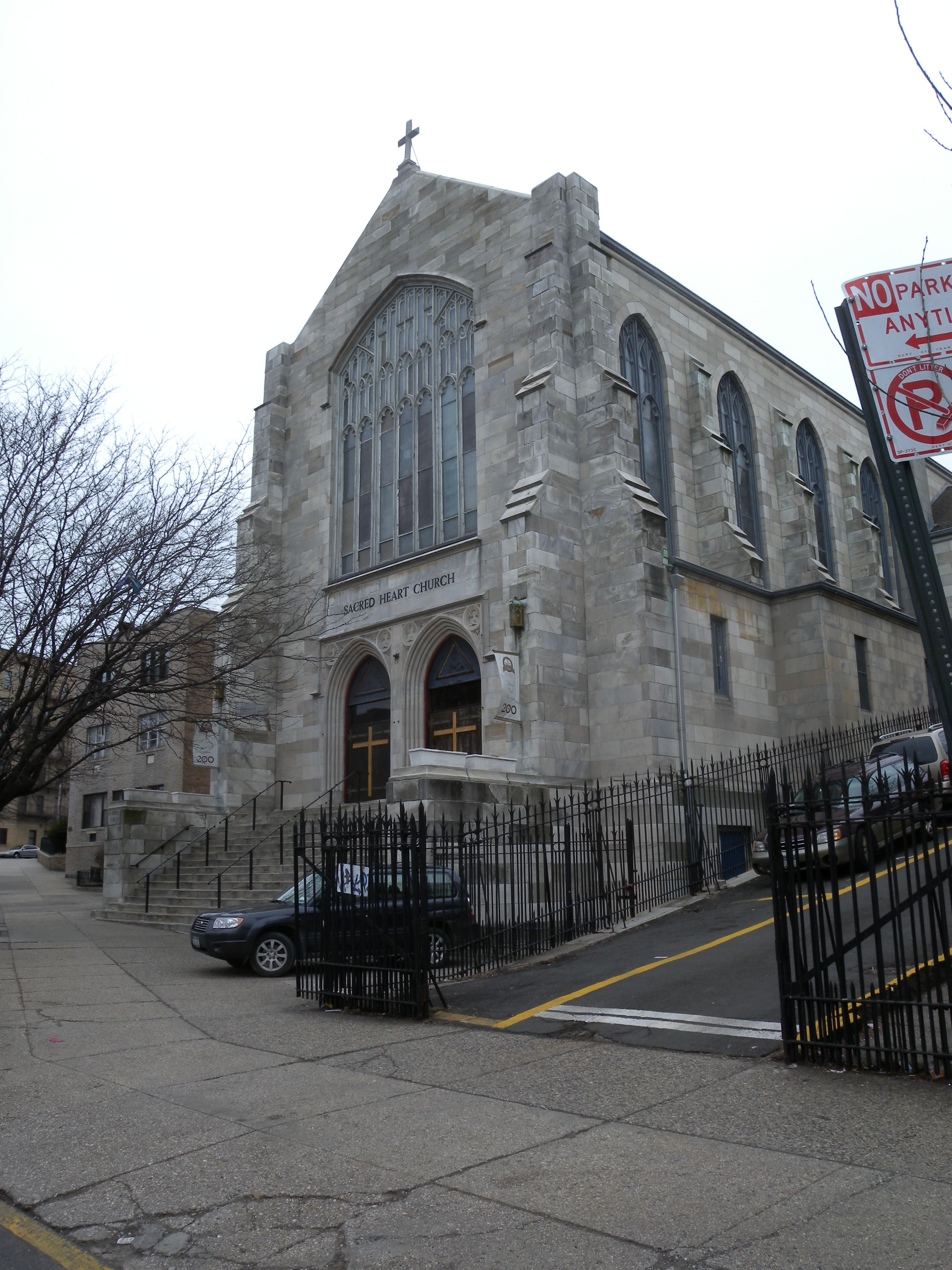
Sacred Heart Church, Bronx

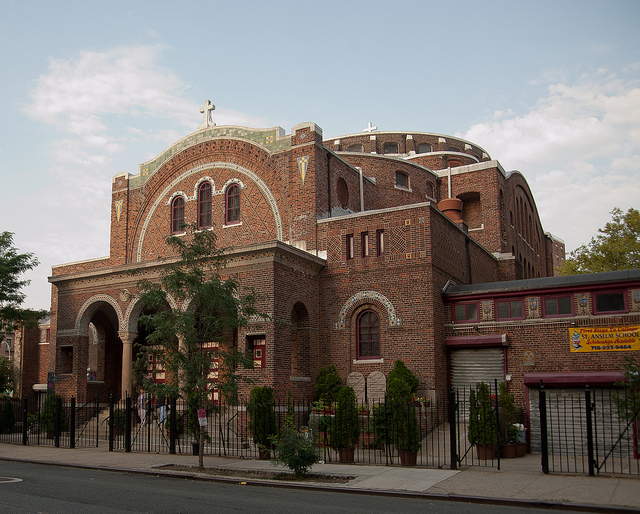
St. Anselm Church, Bronx

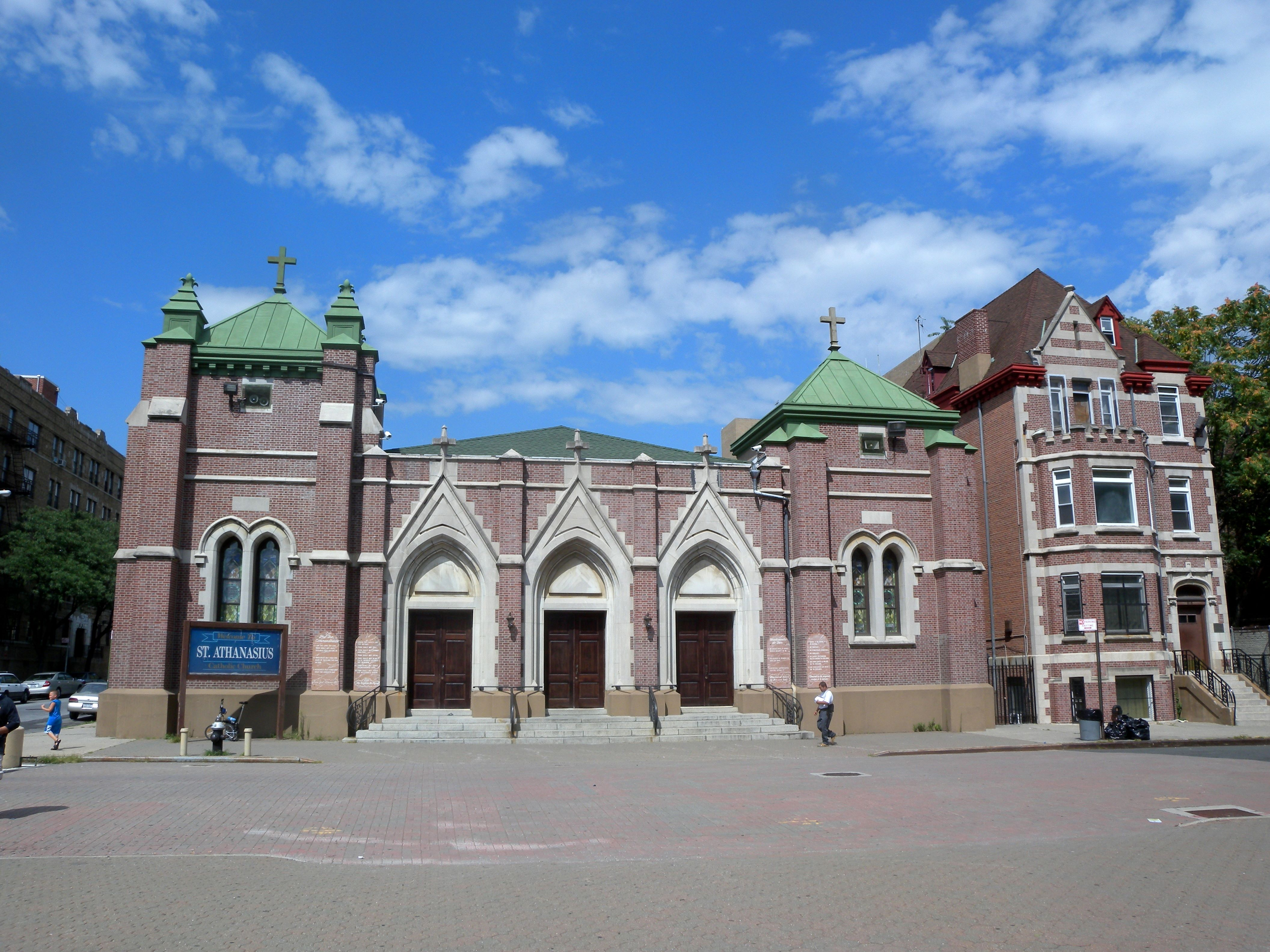
St Athanasius, Bronx

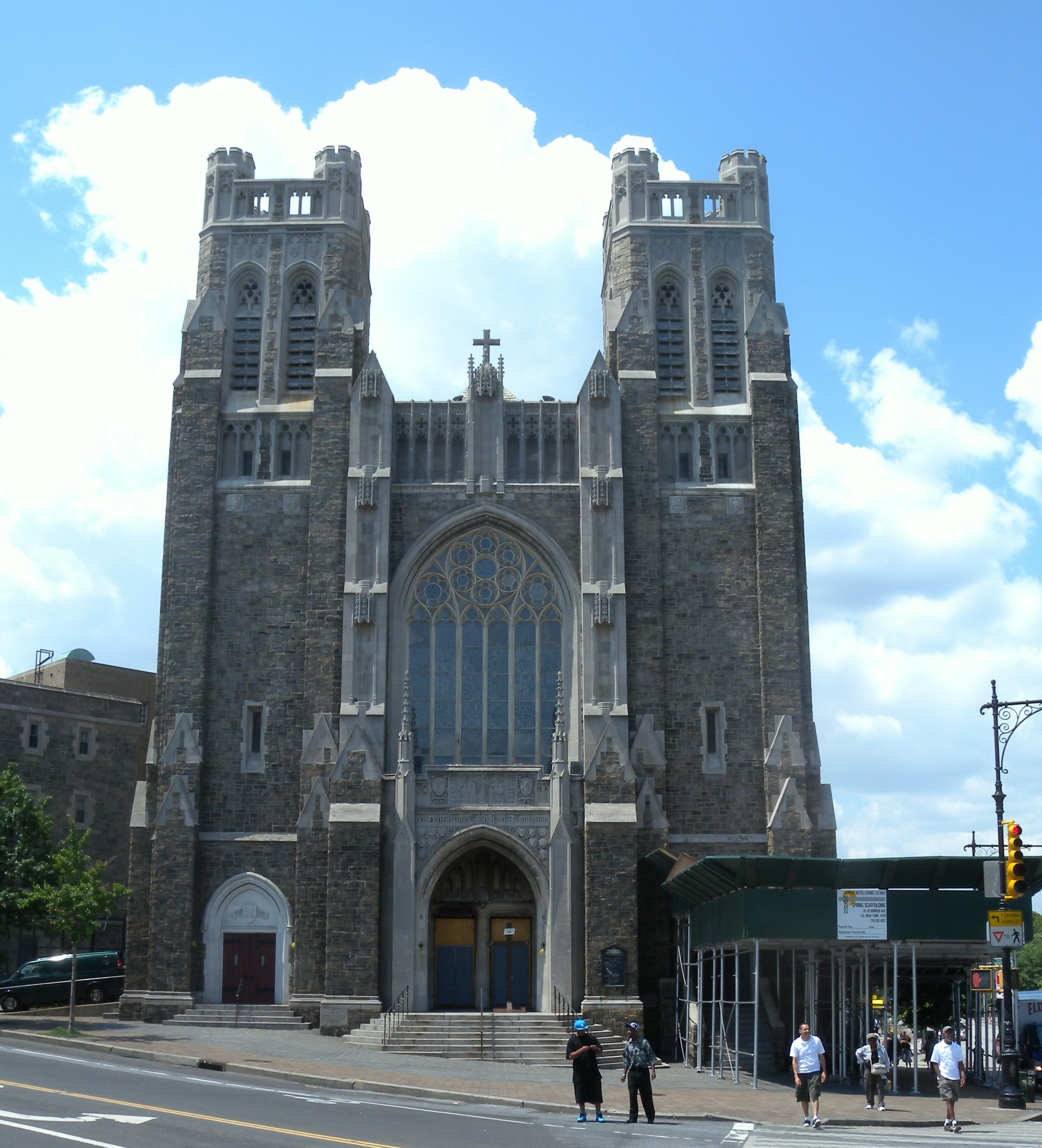
St Nicholas of Tolentine, Bronx

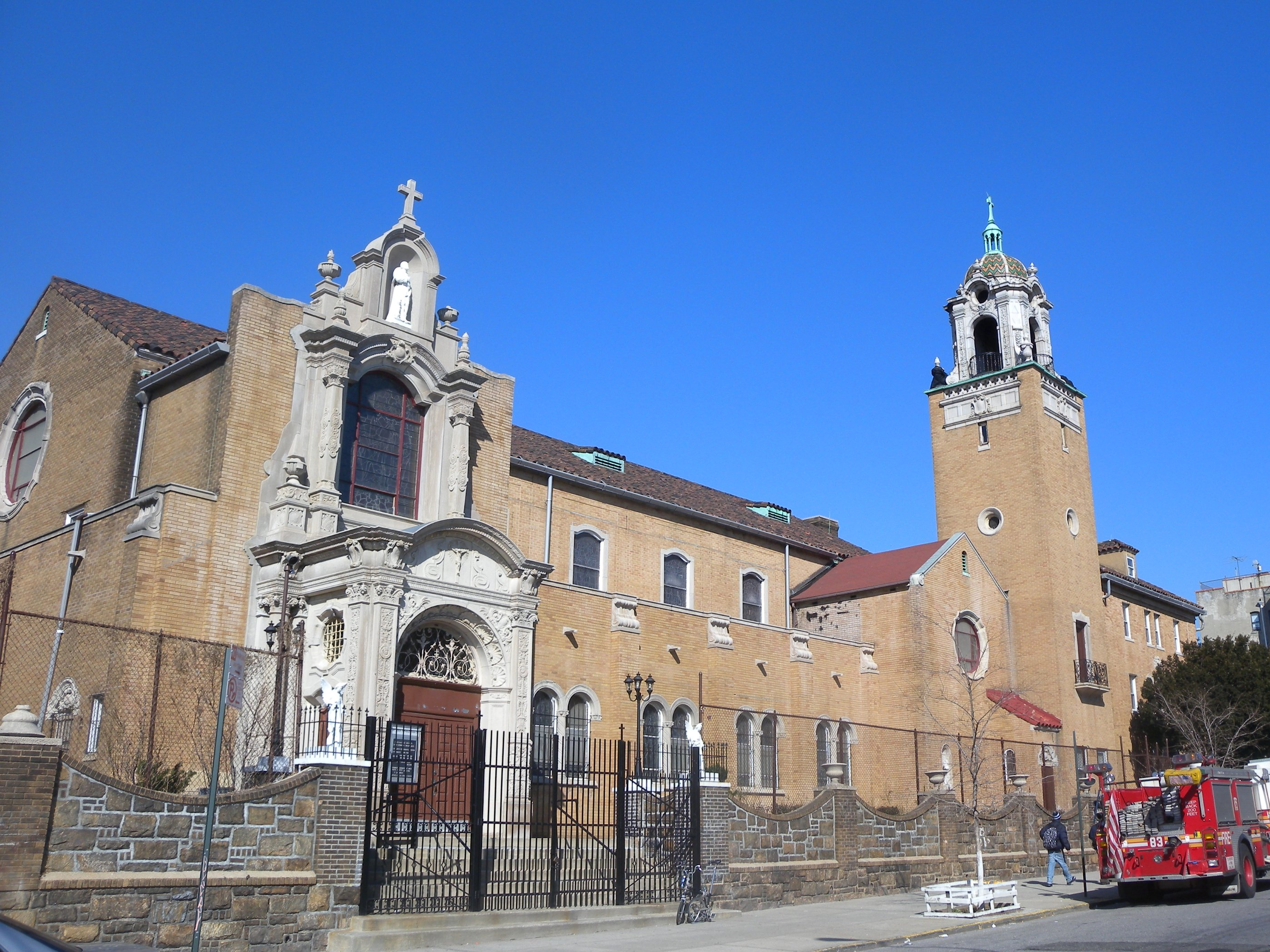
St Roch, Bronx

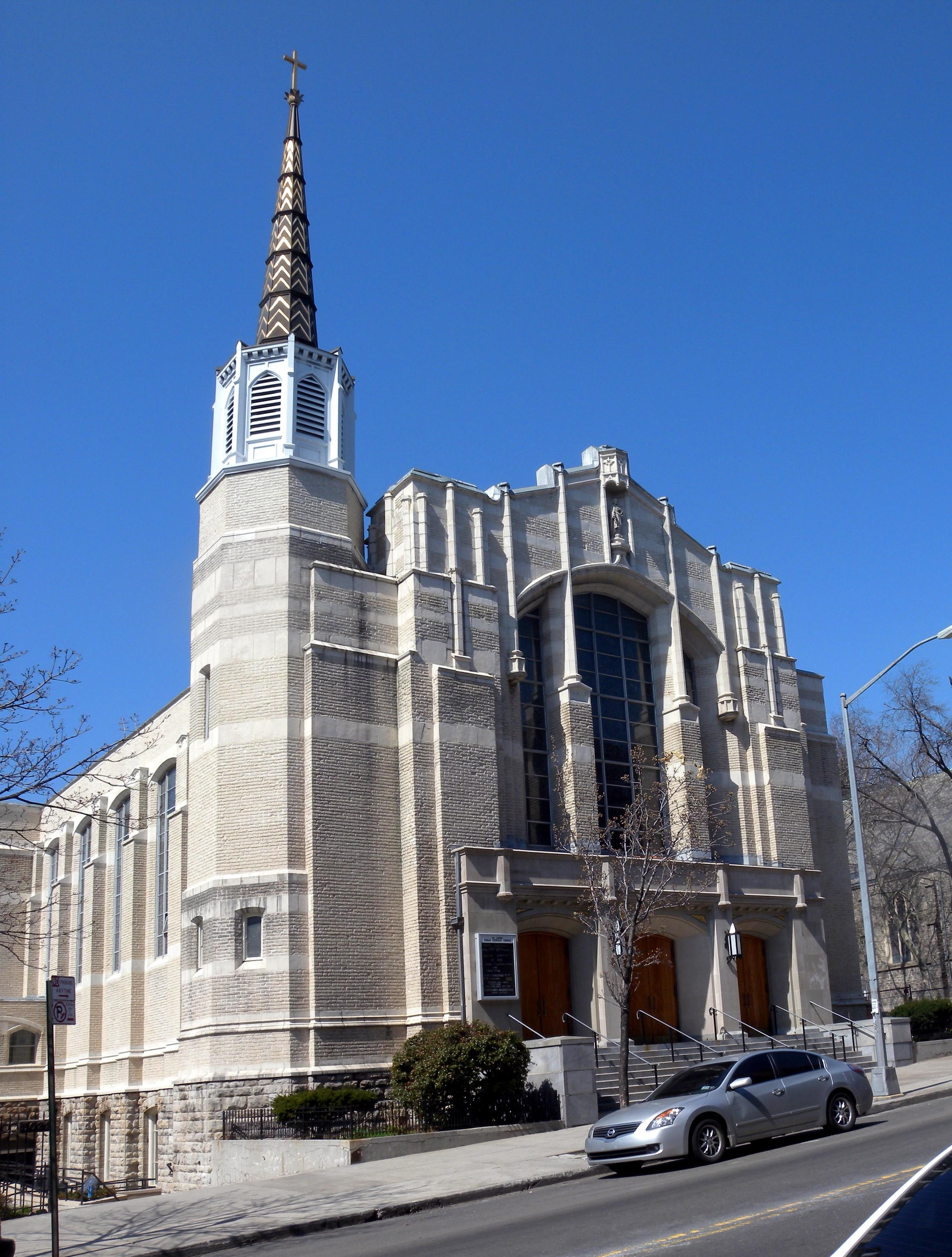
St. John's Church, Bronx

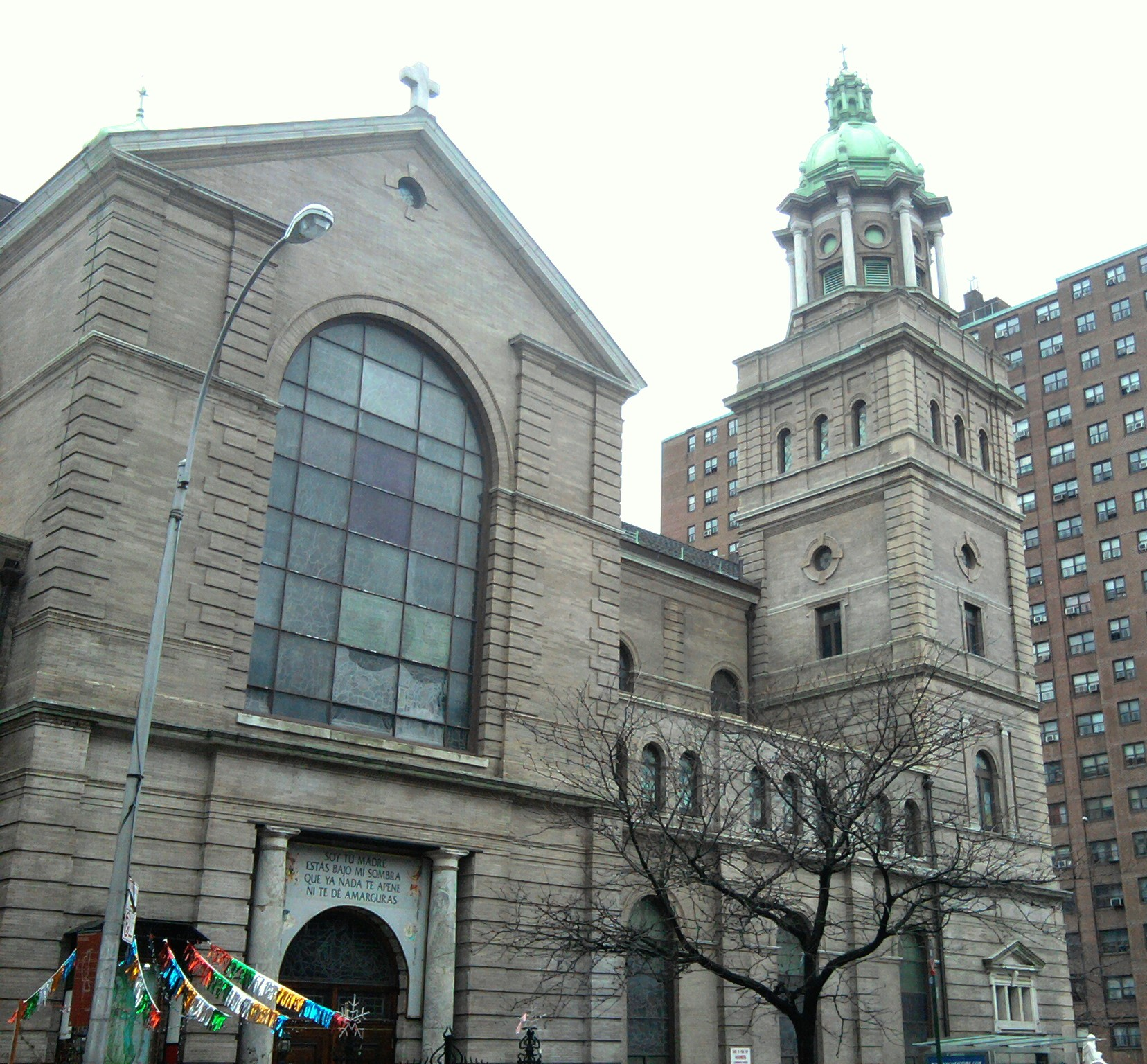
St. Jerome Church, Bronx

- Sacred Heart Parish – St. Francis Parish
  - Church of the Sacred Heart (1253 W 168th Street) – Established in 1912.
- Christ the King's Church (Grand Concourse at Marcy Pl.) – Established in 1927.
- Fordham University Church – Established in 1845, campus church of Fordham University. Also known as "Old St. John's." Staffed by the Jesuit Fathers.
- Holy Cross Church (600 Soundview Ave.) – Established in 1921.
- Church of Our Lady of Mercy (2496 Marion Ave.) – Established in 1907.
- Our Lady of Mt, Carmel Church (627 E. 187th St.) – Established in 1906.
- Nativity of Our Blessed Lady Church (1531 East 233rd Street) – Established in 1969.
- Our Lady of Refuge Church (East 196 Street) – Established in 1923.
- Our Lady of Solace – St. Dominic Parish – Established in 2007.
  - Our Lady of Solace's Church (731 Morris Park Ave.) – Established 1903; staffed by the Idente Missionaries. Merged in 2007.
  - St. Dominic's Church (1739 Unionport Road) – Established in 1927; staffed by the Idente Missionaries. Merged in 2007.
- Santa Maria Church (2352 St. Raymonds Ave.) – Established in 1926; staffed by the Idente Missionaries. Closed in 2023.
- Church of St. Angela Merici (917 Morris Ave.) – Established in 1899; staffed by the Apostles of Jesus (2000–present).
- Church of St. Anselm and St. Roch Parish – Established in 2015.
  - Church of St. Anselm (685 Tinton Avenue) – Established in 1891; staffed by the Augustinian Recollects. Formerly staffed by the Benedictine friars. Merged in 2015.
  - Church of St. Roch (525 Wales Avenue) – Established in 1899, merged in 2015; deconsecrated in 2017.
- St. Anthony of Padua Church (822 E. 166th St.) – Established in 1903.
- St. Athanasius Church (878 Tiffany St.) – Established in 1907.
- St. Augustine – Our Lady of Victory Church (1512 Webster Ave)
  - St. Augustine's Church (E. 167th St.) – Established in 1849. Closed in 2011, building demolished.
- Church of St. Benedict (2969 Otis Ave.) – Established in 1923.
- Parish of St. Brendan and of St. Ann – Established in 2015.
  - St. Brendan's Church (E. 207th St.) – Established in 1908. Merged in 2015.
  - St. Ann's Church (Bainbridge Ave. at Gun Hill Road) – Established in 1927, merged in 2015; deconsecrated in 2017.
- St. Clare of Assisi Church (1911 Hone Ave) – Established in 1929.
- St. Frances de Chantal's Church (190 Hollywood Avenue) – Established in 1927.
- St. Frances of Rome, St. Francis of Assisi, St. Anthony and Our Lady of Grace Parish – Established in 2015
  - St. Frances of Rome's Church (4307 Barnes Ave.) – Established in 1898, merged in 2015
  - St. Anthony's Church (1496 Commonwealth Ave.) – Established in 1908; merged in 2015.
  - Church of Our Lady of Grace – Personal parish established in 1924; merged in 2015.
  - St. Francis Assisi Church – Merged with St. Frances in the 1990's.
- St. Francis Xavier Church (1658 Lurting Ave.) – Established in 1928.
- Church of St. Helena's (1315 Olmstead Ave.) – Established in 1940.
- Church of St. Jerome (230 Alexander Ave.) – Established in 1869.
- St. Joan of Arc Church (1388 Stratford Ave) – Established in 1949.
- St. John's Visitation Parish – Established in 2015.
  - St. John's Church (3021 Kingsbridge Ave.) – Established in 1877.
  - Visitation of the Blessed Virgin Mary Church (160 Van Cortlandt Park South) – Established in 1928; merged in 2015. Deconsecrated in 2017.
- St. John Chrysostom Parish (985 E. 167th St.) – Established in 1899.
- St. Luke's Catholic Church (623 E. 138th St.) – Established in 1897.
- St. Lucy's Parish (833 Mace Ave.) – Established in 1927.
- St. Margaret Mary Church (1914 Morris Ave.) – Established in 1923.
- St. Margaret of Cortona – St. Gabriel Parish – Established in 2015.
  - St. Margaret of Cortona Church (6000 Riverdale Ave.) – Established in 1890.^{†}Merged in 2015
  - St. Gabriel's Roman Catholic Church (3250 Arlington Ave) – Established in 1939. Merged in 2015.
- St. Martin of Tours Catholic Church (664 Grote St.) – Established in 1897.
- St. Nicholas of Tolentine Church (2345 University Ave.) – Established in 1906; staffed by the Augustinian Fathers.
- Church of St. Raymond (1759 Castle Hill Ave) – Established in 1842.
- St. Rita of Cascia Parish – Established in 2015.
  - St. Rita of Cascia Church (448 College Ave.) – Established in 1904, merged in 2015.
  - St. Pius V Church (416–418, 420 East 145th) – Established in 1906, merged in 2015.
- St. Simon Stock – St. Joseph Parish (2191 Valentine Ave.) – Established in 2015.
  - St. Simon Stock Church – Established in 1921. staffed by the Carmelite Fathers (1919–present). Merged in 2015
  - St. Joseph's Church (1949 Bathgate Ave.) – Established in 1873, merged in 2015, desacralized in 2017.
- St. Theresa's Church (2855 St. Theresa Ave.) – Established in 1927.
- St. Thomas Aquinas Church (1900 Crotona Pkwy.) – Established in 1890.
- Saints Peter and Paul's Church (833 St. Ann's Ave.) – Established in 1897.
- Holy Family, Blessed Sacrament and St. John Vianney Parish – Established in 2015.
  - Holy Family Church (2155 Blackrock Ave.) – Merged in 2015.
  - Blessed Sacrament Church (1170 Beach Avenue) – Established in 1927, merged in 2015.
  - St. John Vianney Cure of Ars Church – Established in 1961. Merged in 2015.
- Immaculate Conception Church (754 Gun Hill Rd.) – Established in 1903.
- Immaculate Conception of the Blessed Virgin Mary Church (389 E 150th St,) – Established in 1853; staffed by the Redemptorist Fathers.
- Our Lady of Pity – Established in 1908, closed in 2007, demolished.
- Our Lady of the Assumption & St. Mary Star of the Sea – Established in 2015
  - Our Lady of the Assumption Church(1634 Mahan Ave.) – merged in 2015.
  - St. Mary Star of the Sea Church (596 City Island Ave.) – merged in 2015.

==== Churches in Manhattan ====
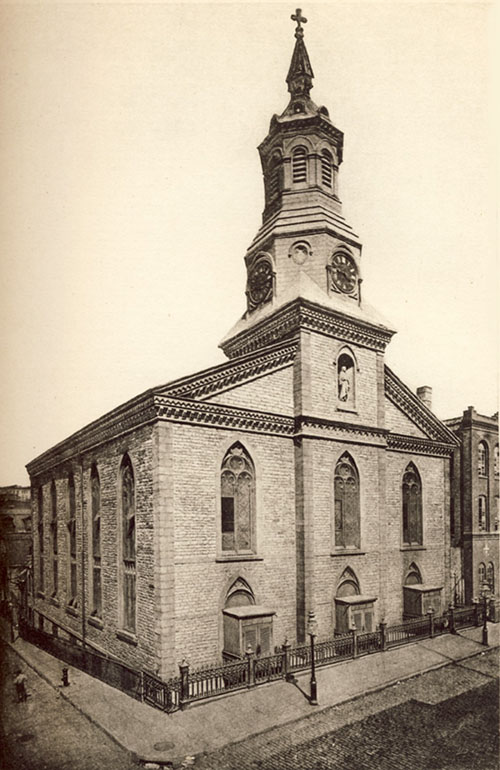
Church of the Transfiguration, Manhattan

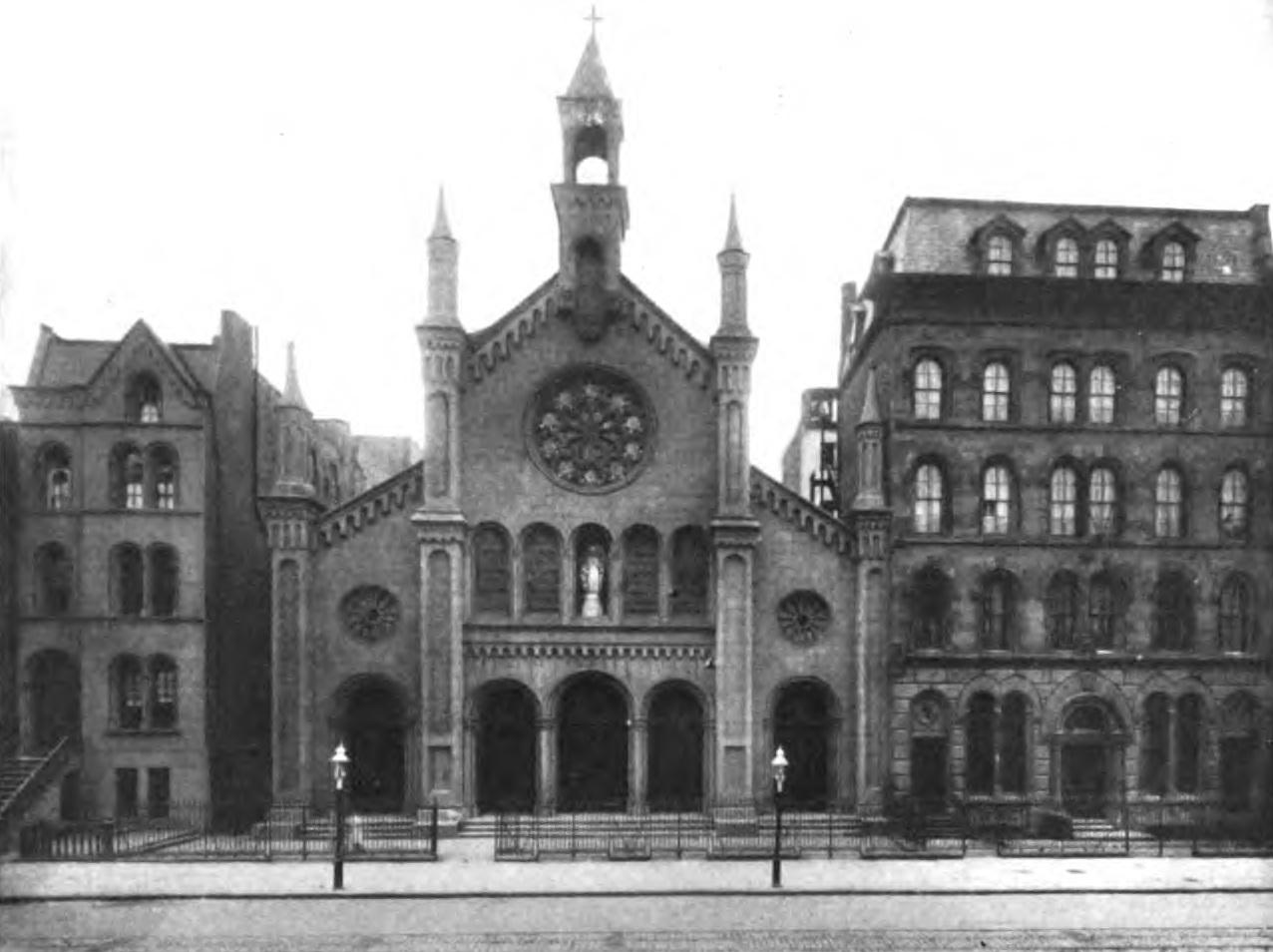
Church of the Immaculate Conception, Manhattan

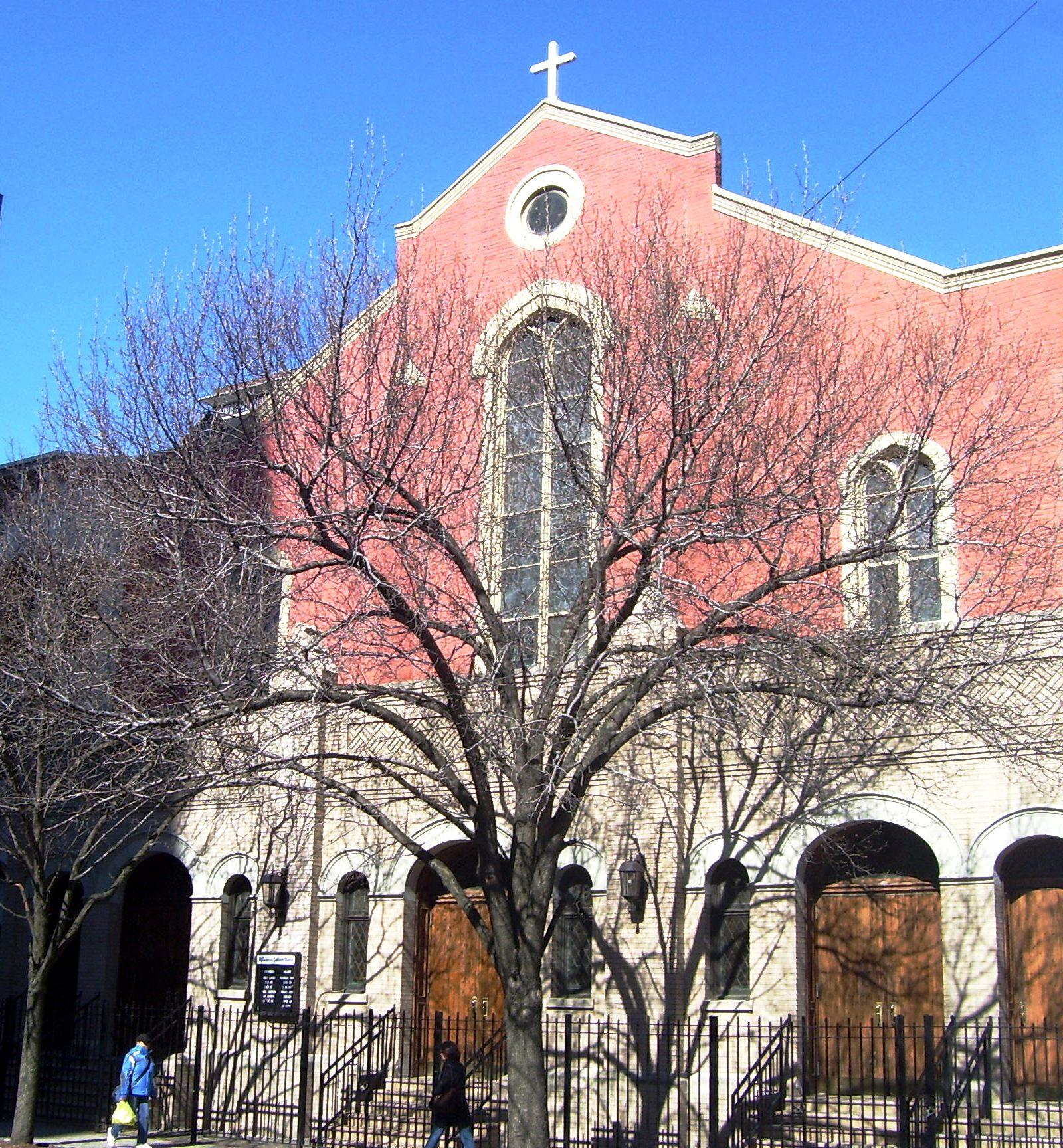
St. Columba Church, Manhattan

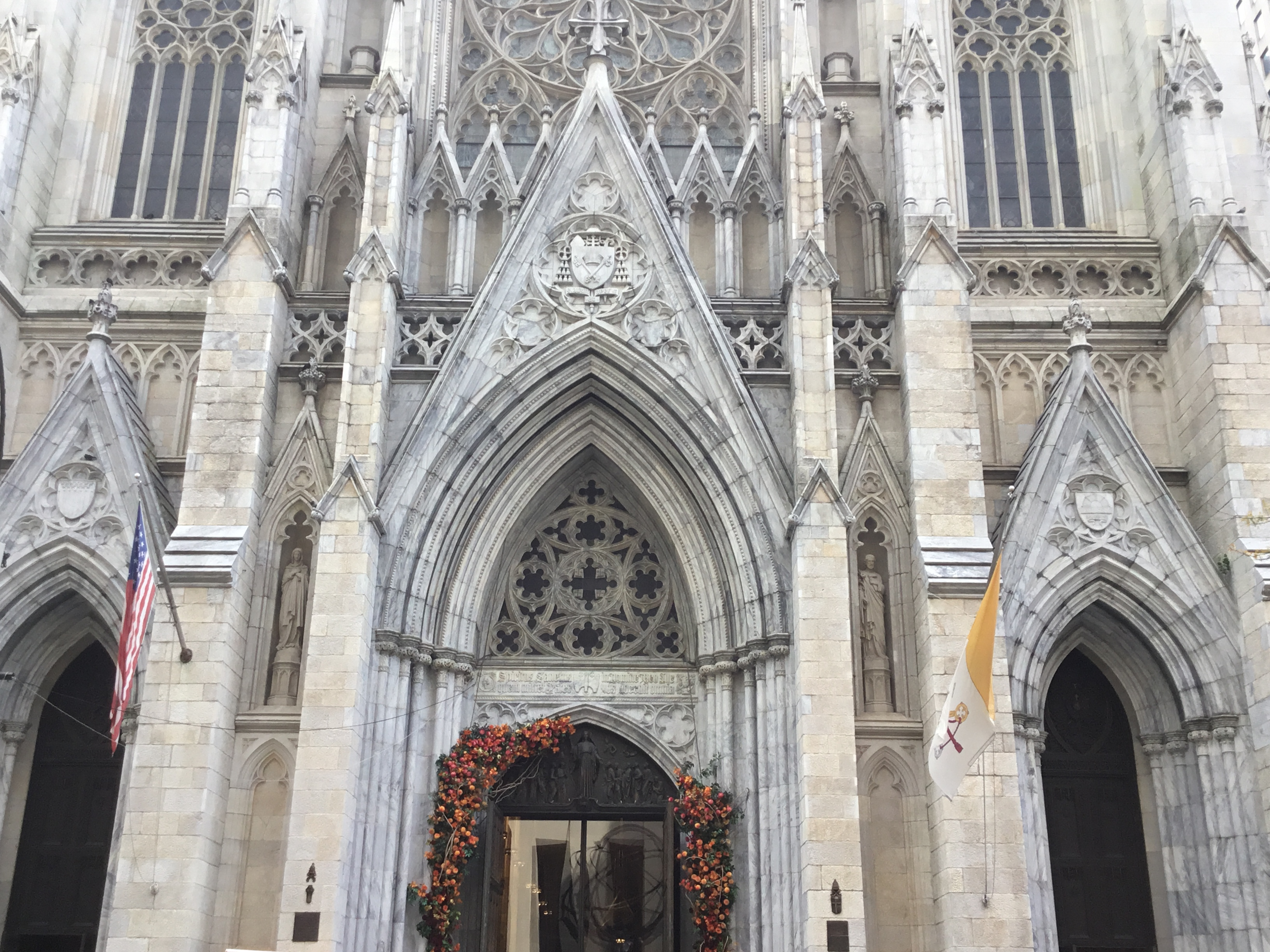
St. Patrick's Cathedral, Manhattan, New York City

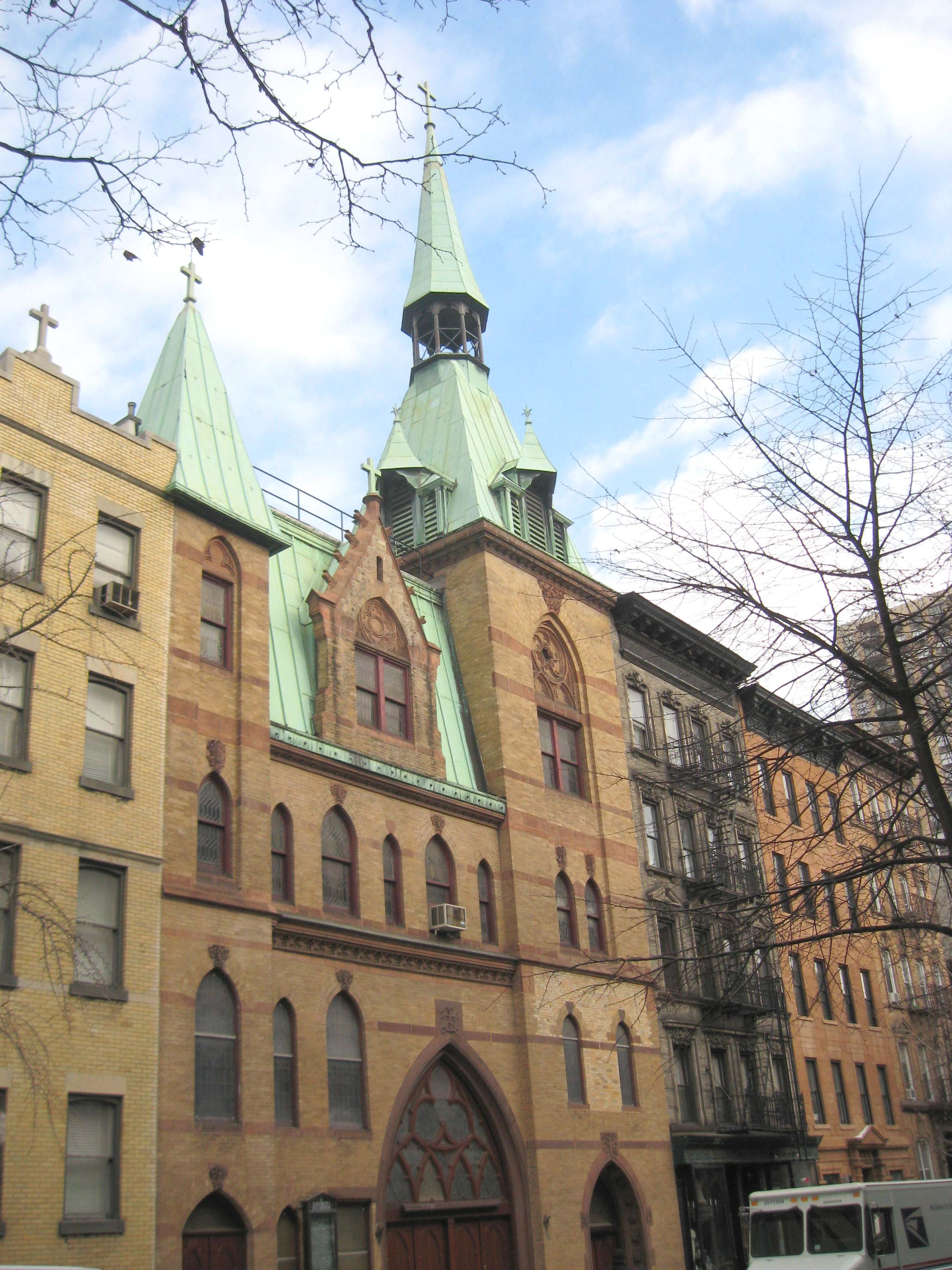
St Elizabeth of Hungary Church, Manhattan

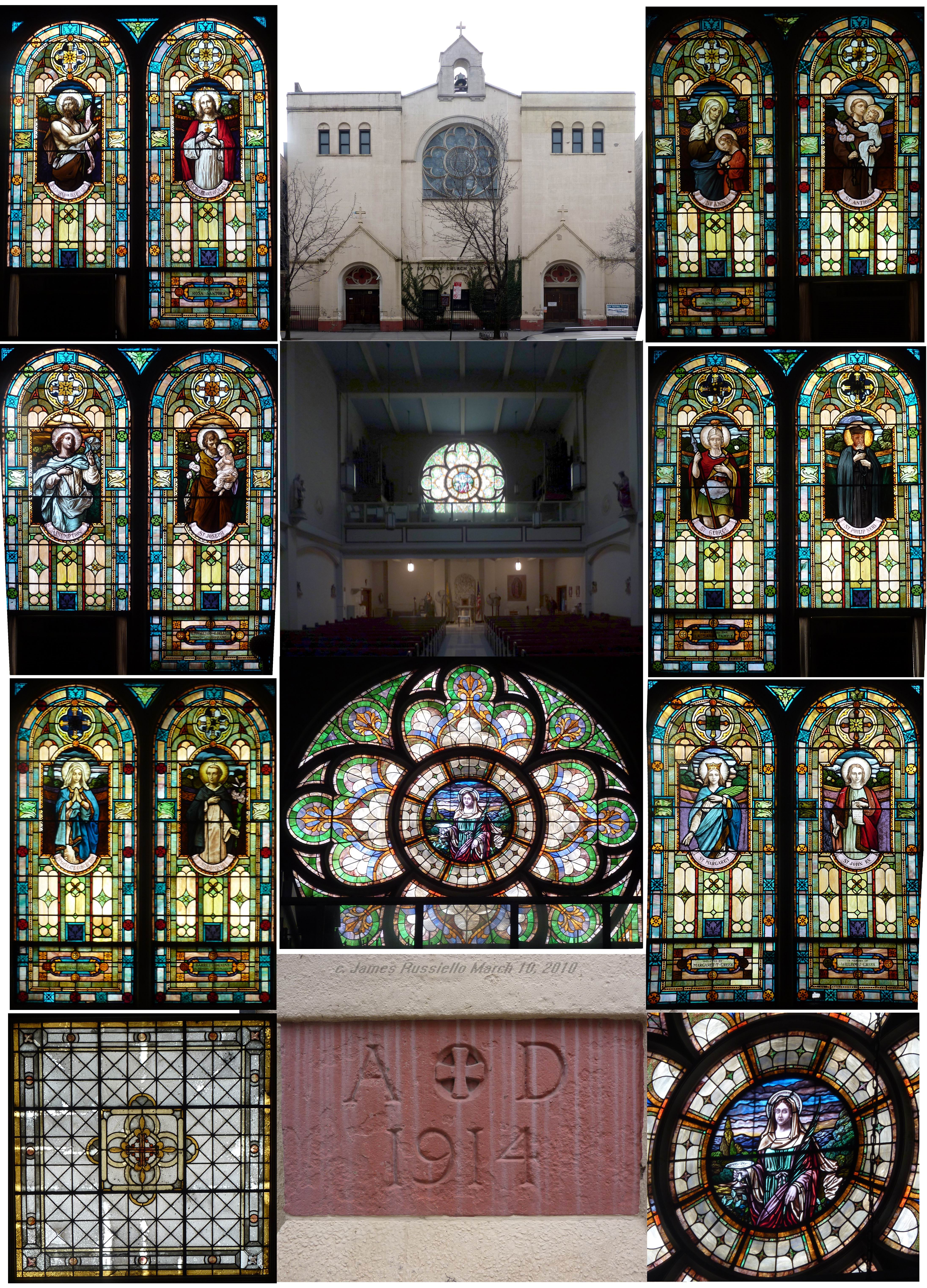
St. Lucy's Church, Manhattan

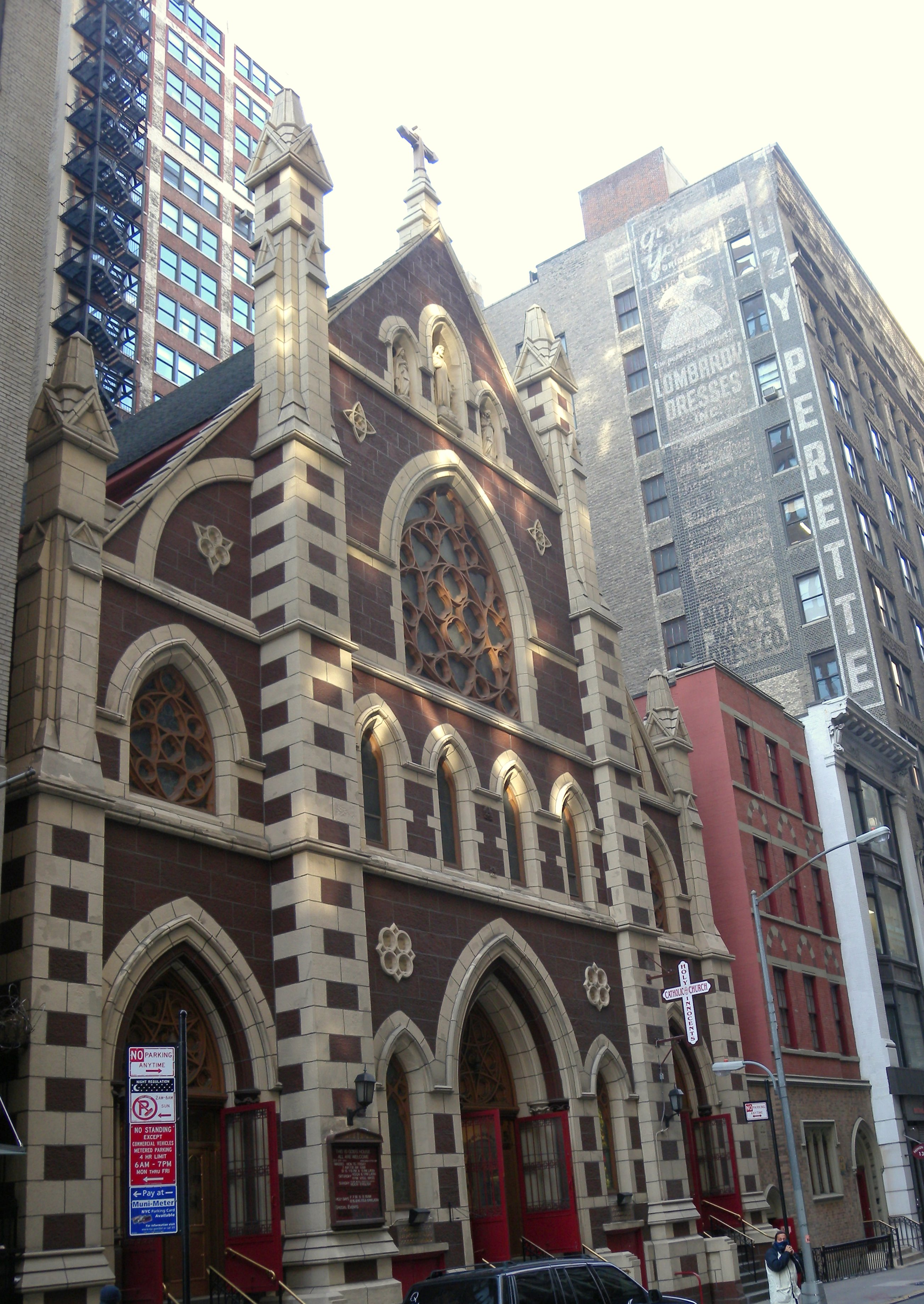
Church of the Holy Innocents, Manhattan

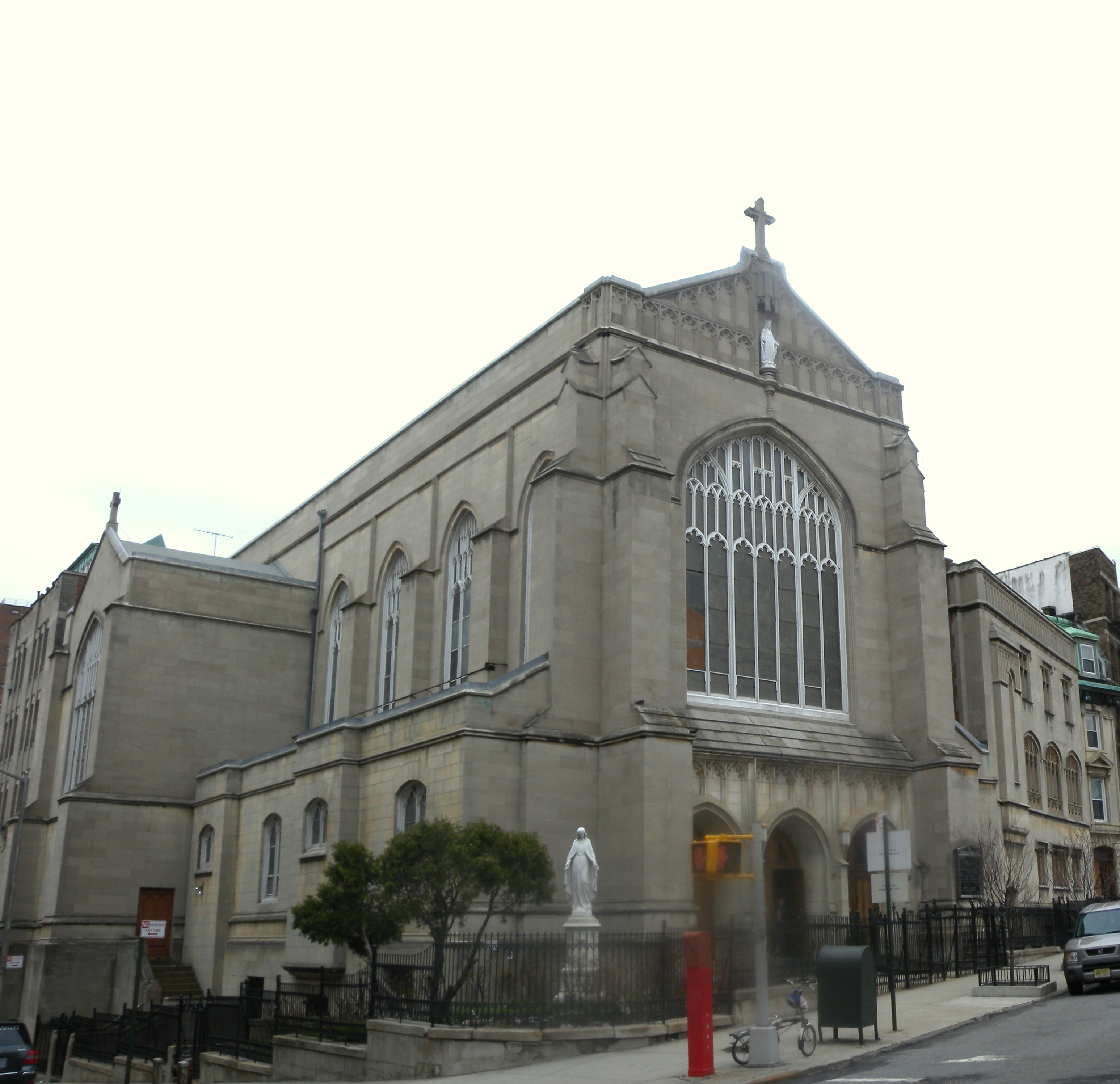
Church of the Annunciation, Manhattan

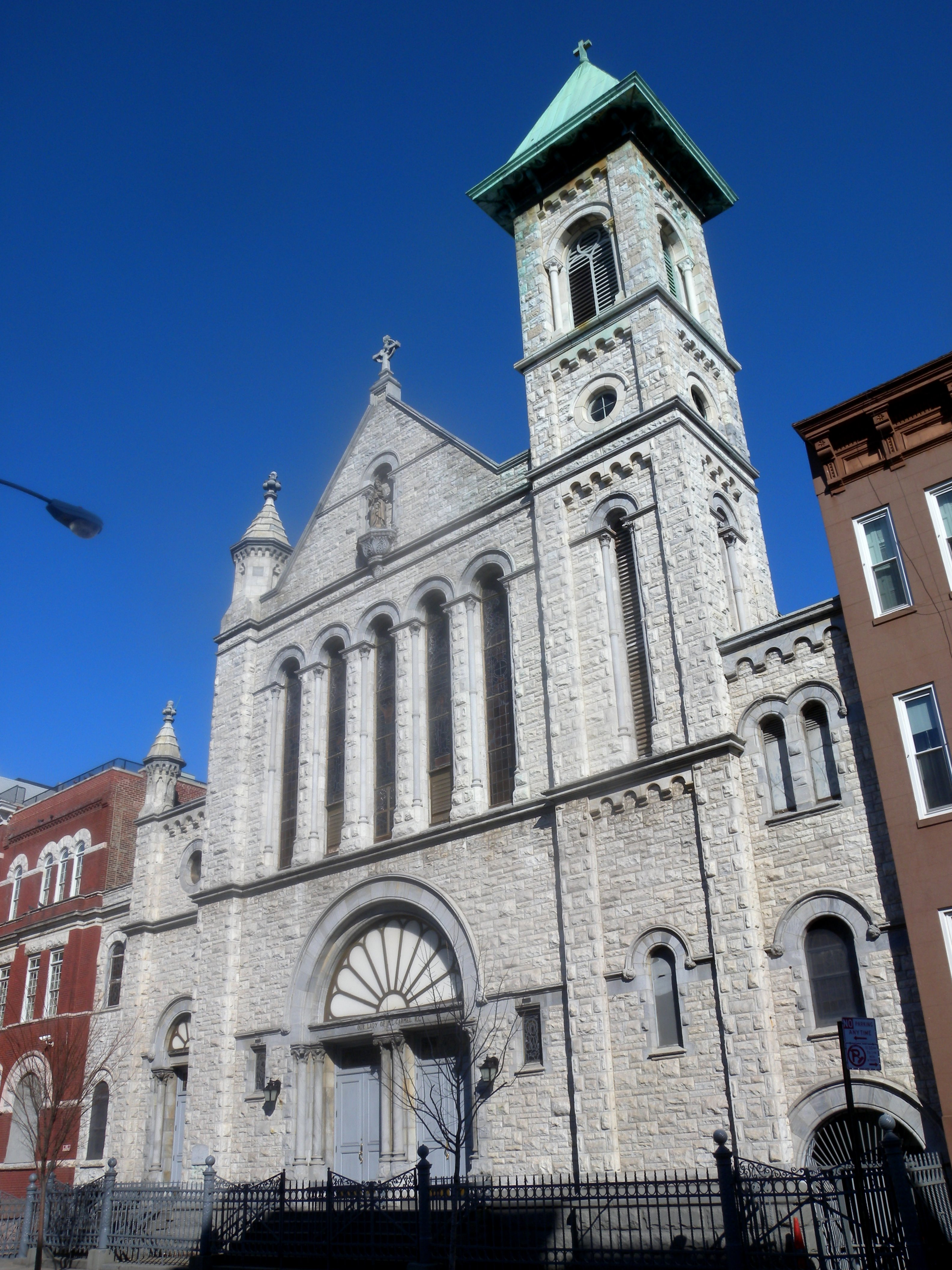
Our Lady of Mt Carmel Church, Manhattan

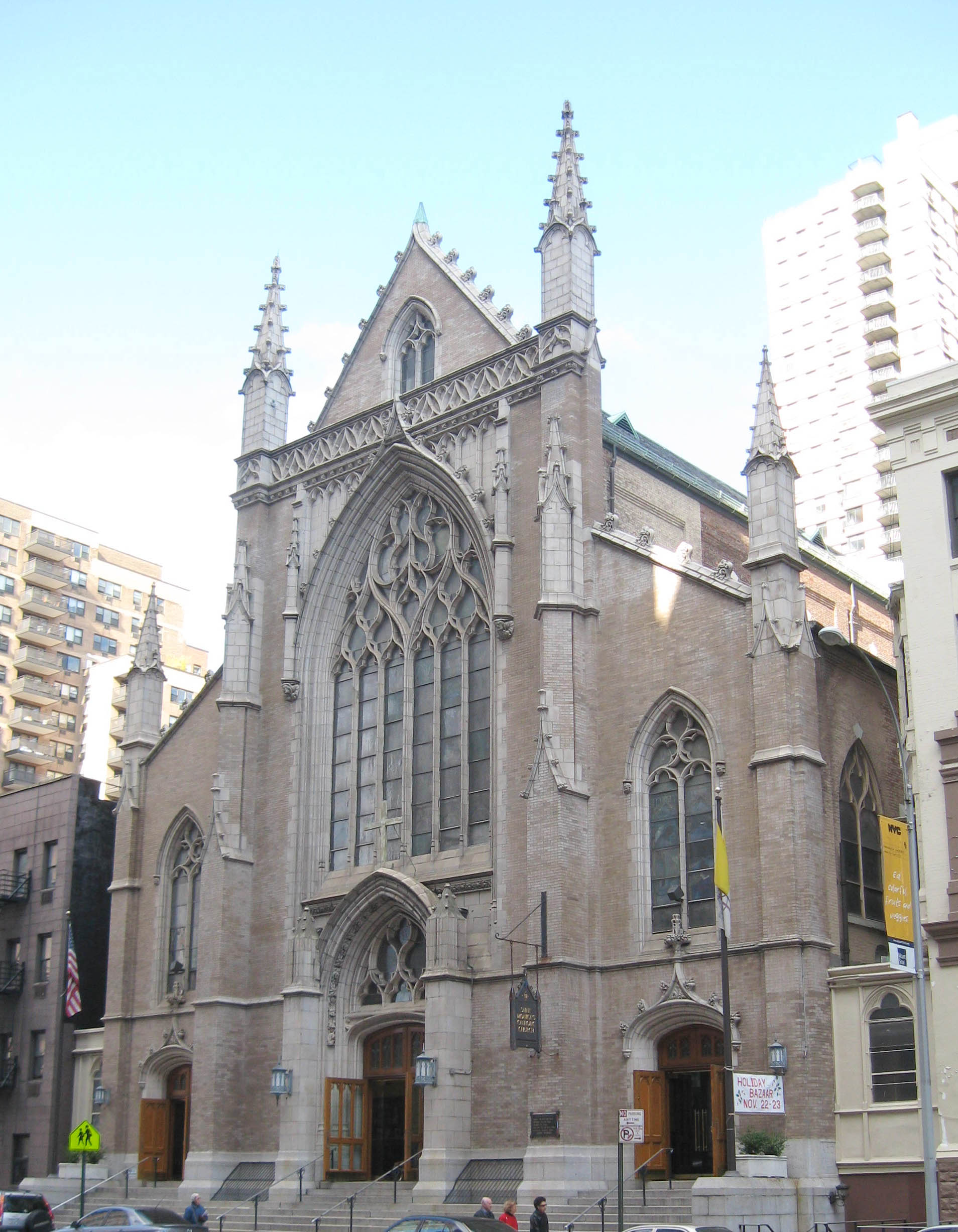
St Monica Church, Manhattan

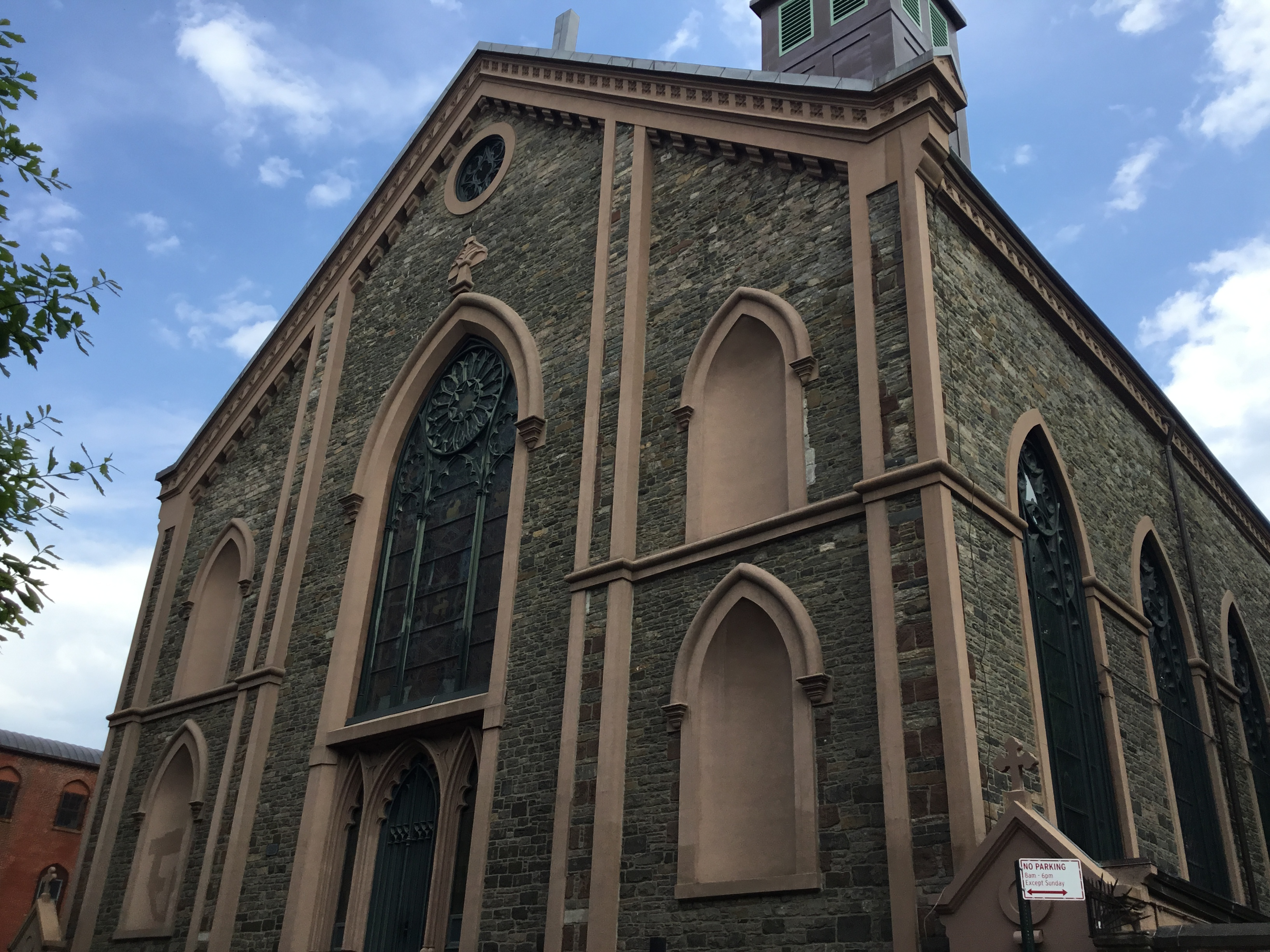
St. Patrick's Old Cathedral, Manhattan

- St. Patrick's Cathedral (50th St. and Fifth Ave.) – Established in 1858. Current cathedral of the archdiocese, not to be confused with Old St. Patrick's Cathedral.
- Church of the Annunciation (88 Convent Ave.) – Established in 1853; staffed by the Piarist Fathers.
- San Lorenzo Ruiz Chapel (378 Broome St.) – Established in 2005. Building sold in 2017.
- Parish Church of Corpus Christi and Notre Dame – Established in 2023.
  - Corpus Christi Church (529 W. 121st St.) – Established in 1906. Merged in 2023
  - Church of Notre Dame (405 W. 114th St.) – Established in 1910; formerly staffed by the Fathers of Mercy (1910–1960). Merged in 2023.
- Our Lady of Esperanza Church (624 W. 156th St.) – Established in 1912.
- Our Lady of Good Counsel and St. Thomas Moore Parish.
  - Our Lady of Good Counsel Church (230 E. 90th St.) – Established in 1886. Merged with St. Thomas.
  - St. Thomas More's Church (67 E. 89th St.) – Established in 1950. Merged with Our Lady.
- Our Lady of Guadalupe at St. Bernard's Church (328 W. 14th St.) – Established in 2003 as a result of a parish merger.
- Our Lady of Lourdes Church (472 W. 142nd St.) – Established in 1901.
- Our Lady of Mt. Carmel Church (448 E. 116th St.) – Established in 1884; staffed by the Pallottine Fathers.^{†}
- Church of Our Lady of Sorrows (105 Pitt Street ) – Established in 1867; staffed by the Capuchin Friars. Formerly known as the Church of Our Lady of the Seven Dolors.
- Church of St. Peter and Our Lady of Victory Parish – Established in 2015.
  - Our Lady of Victory Church (60 William St.) – Established in 1944; previously located at 23 William St. (1944–1945). Merged in 2015.
  - Church of St. Peter (22 Barclay Street) – Established in 1786; first parish in the Diocese of New York. Merged in 2015.
  - Our Lady of the Holy Rosary's Church (7 State St.) – Established in 1884 as a mission; converted in 1887 to a parish. Home to the National Shrine of St. Elizabeth Ann Seton. Merged in 2015.
  - St. Andrew's Church (20 Cardinal Hayes Pl.) – Established in 1842; staffed by the Blessed Sacrament Fathers. Merged with St. Peter's in 2023.
  - St. Joseph's Chapel (385 South End Ave.) – Established in 1983. Closed in 2017
- Our Lady Queen of Martyrs – Saint Jude Parish.
  - Our Lady Queen of Martyrs Church (91 Arden St.) – Established in 1927. Merged with Saint Jude.
  - St. Jude's Church (3815 Tenth Avenue) – Established in 1949. Merged with Our Lady.
- Church of Our Saviour – Chapel of the Sacred Hearts of Jesus & Mary Parish – Established in 2015.
  - Our Saviour Church (59 Park Avenue) – Established in 1955. Merged in 2015.
  - Church of Our Lady of the Scapular–St. Stephen (142 E. 29th St.) – Established in the 1980s with the merger of Our Lady of the Scapular and St. Stephen Parishes. Merged in 2015.
  - Chapel of the Sacred Hearts of Jesus & Mary (325 East 33rd St.) – Established in 1914 as a parish; merged with Our Lady and St. Stephen in 2007, church demolished. Chapel constructed. Merged in 2015.
- Slovenian Church of St. Cyril (62 St. Mark's Place) – Established in 1916; staffed by Slovenian Franciscans.
- SS. Cyril, Methodius, and Raphael's Church (502 W. 41st St.) – Established in 1974 from the merger of St. Raphael Church and SS. Cyril & Methodius Church. Staffed by Croatian Franciscan Friars (1974–present).
- Church of St. Agnes (141 E. 43rd St.) – Established in 1873.^{†}
- St. Aloysius Church (219 W. 132nd St.) – Established in 1899; staffed by the Jesuit Fathers.
- St. Ann's Church (312 E. 110th St.) – Established in 1873. Closed in 2003.
  - St. Lucy's Church (344 E. 104th St.) – Established in 1900; staffed by the Sons of Divine Providence. Merged in 2015, closed in 2017
- St. Anthony of Padua Church (154 Sullivan Street) – Established in 1866; staffed by the Franciscan Friars.
- St. Benedict the Moor Church (342 W. 53rd St.) – Established in 1883 to serve the African American community of the city; staffed by Spanish friars of the Third Order of Saint Francis (T.O.R.). Deconsecrated in 2017.
- Church of St. Catherine of Genoa (506 W. 153rd St.) – Established in 1887.
- Parish of St. Vincent Ferrer and St. Catherine of Siena
  - St. Catherine of Siena's Church (411 E. 68th St.) – Established in 1897 as a mission; 1907 as a parish. Staffed by the Dominican Fathers. Merged with St. Vincent.
  - Church of St. Vincent Ferrer (869 Lexington Avenue) – Established in 1918. Merged with St. Catherine.
- St. Cecilia and Holy Agony Church – Established in 2014.
  - St. Cecilia's Church (120 East 106th Street.) – Established in 1873; staffed by the Redemptorist Fathers (1939–present). Merged in 2014
  - Church of the Holy Agony (1834 Third Avenue) – Established in 1930; formerly a mission of Our Lady of the Miraculous Medal Parish. Staffed by the Vincentian Fathers. Parish merged in 2014, deconsecrated in 2017.
- Parish of St. Charles Borromeo, Resurrection and All Saints– Established in 2015.
  - St. Charles Borromeo's Church (211 W. 141st St.) – Established in 1888. Merged in 2015.
  - Chapel of the Resurrection (276 W. 151st St.) – Established in 1907. Merged in 2015.
  - All Saints Church (47 East 129th Street, ) – Established in 1879; staffed by the Franciscan Friars. Closed in 2015.
- Church of St. Elizabeth (268 Wadsworth Avenue) – Established in 1869; formerly located on 187th St. at Broadway (1869–1929).
- St. Emeric's Church (740 East 13th Street) – Established in 1949. Closed in 2013.
- St. Francis de Sales Church (135 East 96th Street) – Established in 1903.
- Church of St. Francis of Assisi (135 W. 31st St.) – Established in 1844; staffed by the Franciscan Friars.
- Church of St. Francis Xavier (45 W. 16th St.) – Established in 1847; staffed by the Jesuit Fathers.
- St. Ignatius Loyola Church (980 Park Ave.) – Established in 1851; staffed by the Jesuit Fathers since 1866. Known as St. Lawrence O'Toole Church (1851–1866).
- St. Jean Baptiste Church (184 East 76th Street) – Established in 1882; staffed by the Fathers of the Blessed Sacrament since 1900. A French-Canadian national parish until 1957.
- Church of St. Joseph of the Holy Family (401 West 125th Street) – Established in 1860.
- Church of St. Joseph (371 Sixth Avenue) – Established in 1829. Staffed by the Dominican Friars.
- St. Malachy – The Actors Chapel (239 W 49th St) – Established in 1902.
- St. Mark the Evangelist Catholic Church (59–61 West 138th Street) – Established in 1907; staffed by the Holy Ghost Fathers (1912–present).
- Church of St. Mary's (438–440 Grand Street) – Established in 1826.
- Church of St. Michael (424 W. 34th St.) – Established in 1857.
- St. Monica, St. Elizabeth of Hungary, St. Stephen of Hungary Parish – Established in 2016.
  - St. Monica Church (413 E. 79th St.) – Established in 1879. Merged in 2016.
  - St. Elizabeth of Hungary Church (211 E. 83rd St.) – Established in 1887; formerly located on East Fourth St. Merged in 2016, church is closed.
  - St. Stephen of Hungary Church (East 82nd St.) – Established in 1927; staffed by Franciscan Friars since 1922. Previously located on 14th Street {1905–1927}. Merged in 2016, church is closed.
- St. Paul and Holy Rosary Church – Established in 2015.
  - St. Paul's Church (113 E. 117th St.) – Established in 1834; staffed by the Institute of the Incarnate Word Fathers (1998–present). Merged in 2015.
  - Holy Rosary Church (119th St. at First Ave.) – Established in 1884; staffed by the Augustinian Friars. Merged in 2015; deconsecrated in 2017.
- Church of St. Paul the Apostle (8–10 Columbus Avenue) – Established in 1876. Mother church of the Paulist Fathers.
- St. Rose of Lima Catholic Church (510 W. 165th St.) – Established in 1901.
- St. Stanislaus Bishop and Martyr's Church (101 East 7th Street) – Established in 1872; stood at 318 Henry St. until 1900. Staffed by the Fathers of St. Paul the First Hermit.
- St. Teresa Church (16–18 Rutgers Street) – Established in 1862.
- St. Veronica's Church (149 Christopher St.) – Established in 1886. Closed.
- Church of the Annunciation (88 Convent Ave) – Established in 1908.
- Church of the Ascension (221 W. 107th St.) – Established in 1895.
- Church of the Blessed Sacrament (152 West 71st Street) – Established in 1887.
- Church of the Epiphany (239 East 21st Street) – Established in 1868.
- Church of the Good Shepherd (608 Isham St.) – Established in 1911; formerly staffed by the Paulist Fathers. Currently staffed by the Capuchin Friars.
- Holy Cross – St. John the Baptist Parish – Established in 2015.
  - Holy Cross Church (329 W. 42nd Street) – Established in 1852. Merged in 2015.
  - St. John the Baptist Church (210 W. 31st St.) – Established in 1840; staffed by the Capuchin Friars; merged in 2015.
- Holy Family Catholic Church (315 East 47th Street) – Established in 1924. Known as the United Nations Parish.
- The Shrine and Parish Church of the Holy Innocents (128 West 37th Street ) – Established in 1868.^{†}
- Holy Name of Jesus – Gregory the Great Church – Established in 2015.
  - Holy Name of Jesus Roman Catholic Church (207 West 96th Street) – Established in 1892; staffed by the Franciscan Friars since 1990. Previously located at Bloomingdale Rd. at 97th St. {1868–1891}. Merged in 2015.
  - St. Gregory the Great Church (144 W. 90th St.) – Established in 1907. Merged in 2015, deconsecrated in 2017.
- Holy Trinity Church (213 West 82nd St.) – Established in 1898.
- Church of the Immaculate Conception (414 East 14th St.) – Established in 1855.
- Church of the Incarnation (1290 St. Nicholas Avenue ) – Established in 1908.
- Sacred Heart of Jesus Catholic Church (457 W. 51st St.) – Established in 1876.
- Church of the Transfiguration & St. James – St. Joseph – Established in 2015
  - Church of the Transfiguration (29 Mott St.) – Established in 1827. Merged in 2015.
  - St. Joseph Church, Chinatown (5 Monroe Street) – merged with St. James in 2007, then St. James – St. Joseph merged with Transfiguration in 2015.
  - St. Joachim's Church (26 Roosevelt Street) – Established in 1888; merged with St. Joseph's in 1967, building demolished.
  - St. James Roman Catholic Church (32 James Street) – Established in 1837; merged with St. Joseph's in 2007, then St. James – St. Joseph merged with Transfiguration in 2015.
- St. Patrick's Old Cathedral (260–264 Mulberry St.) – Established in 1809. Original cathedral for the archdiocese. Not to be confused with current St. Patrick's Cathedral on Fifth Avenue in Manhattan.
  - Shrine Church of the Most Precious Blood (113 Baxter St.) – Established in 1891; staffed by the Franciscan Friars until 2014. Merged in 2015.
- Most Holy Redeemer – Nativity Church – Established in 2015.
  - Church of the Most Holy Redeemer (161–165 East 3rd Street) – Established in 1844. Merged in 2015
  - Church of the Nativity (44 Second Avenue ) – Established in 1842; formerly staffed by the Jesuit Fathers. Merged in 2015; deconsecrated in 2017.
- Guardian Angel – St. Columba Parish – Established in 2015.
  - Church of the Guardian Angel (193 Tenth Avenue) – Established in 1888. Merged in 2015.
  - St. Columba Church (343 W. 25th St.) – Established in 1845. Merged in 2015, church closed.
- Our Lady of Pompeii Church (25 Carmine St) – Established in 1892.
- St. John the Evangelist – Our Lady of Peace Church – Established in 2016.
  - St. John the Evangelist (348 East 55th Street) – Established in 1841, merged in 2015.
  - Our Lady of Peace Church (239–241 East 62nd Street) – Merged in 2015, building sold in 2016.
- St. Albert Church (429–433 West 47th Street) – Established in 1916, closed.
- East River Catholics Parish – Established in 2015.
  - St. John Nepomucene Church (East 4th Street) – Established in 1895, merged in 2015.
  - Church of St. Frances Xavier Cabrini (564 Main St., Roosevelt Island) – Merged in 1973.
  - St. John the Martyr Church – Merged in 2015.

==== Churches in Staten Island ====
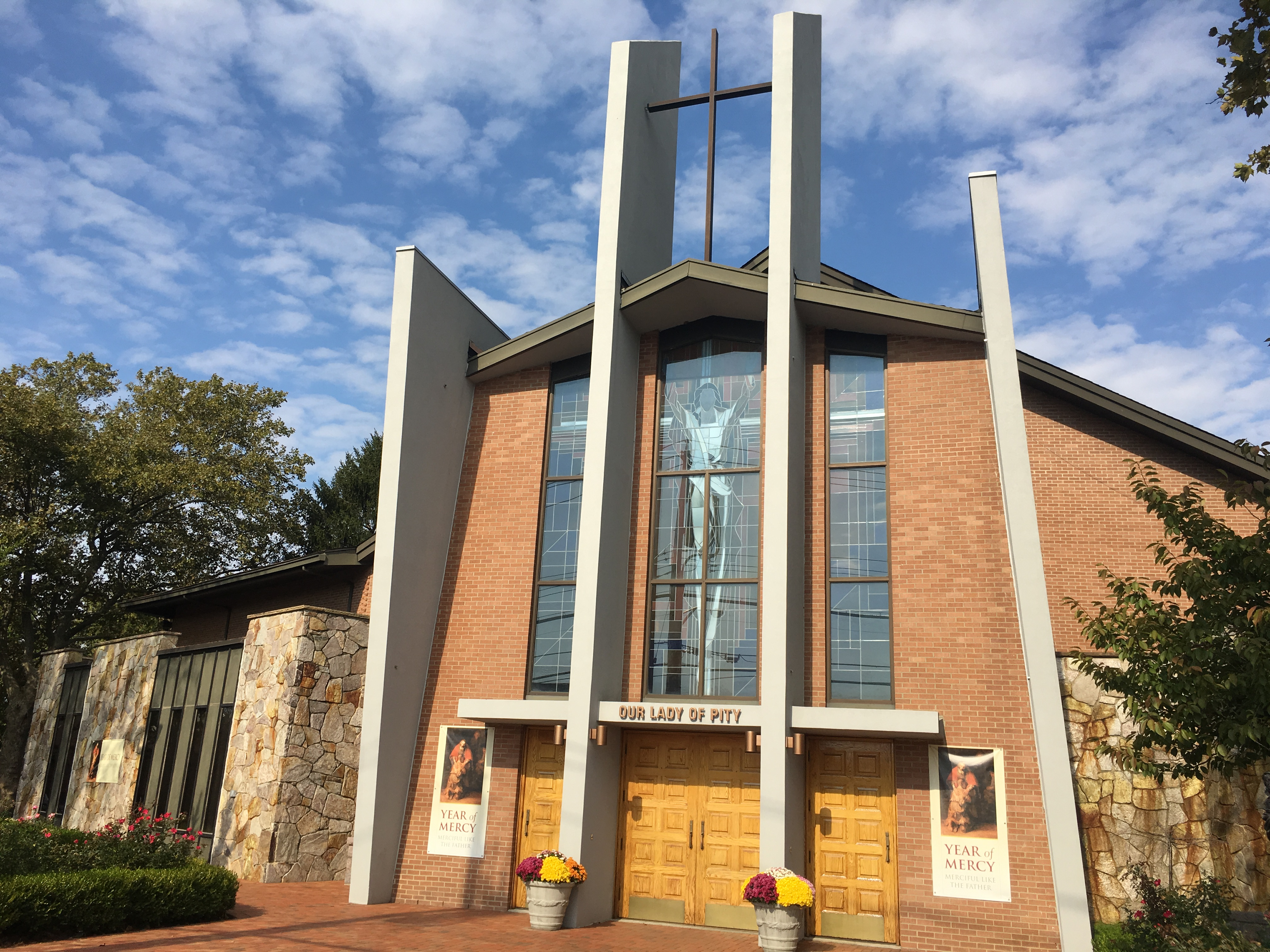
Church of Our Lady of Pity, Staten Island

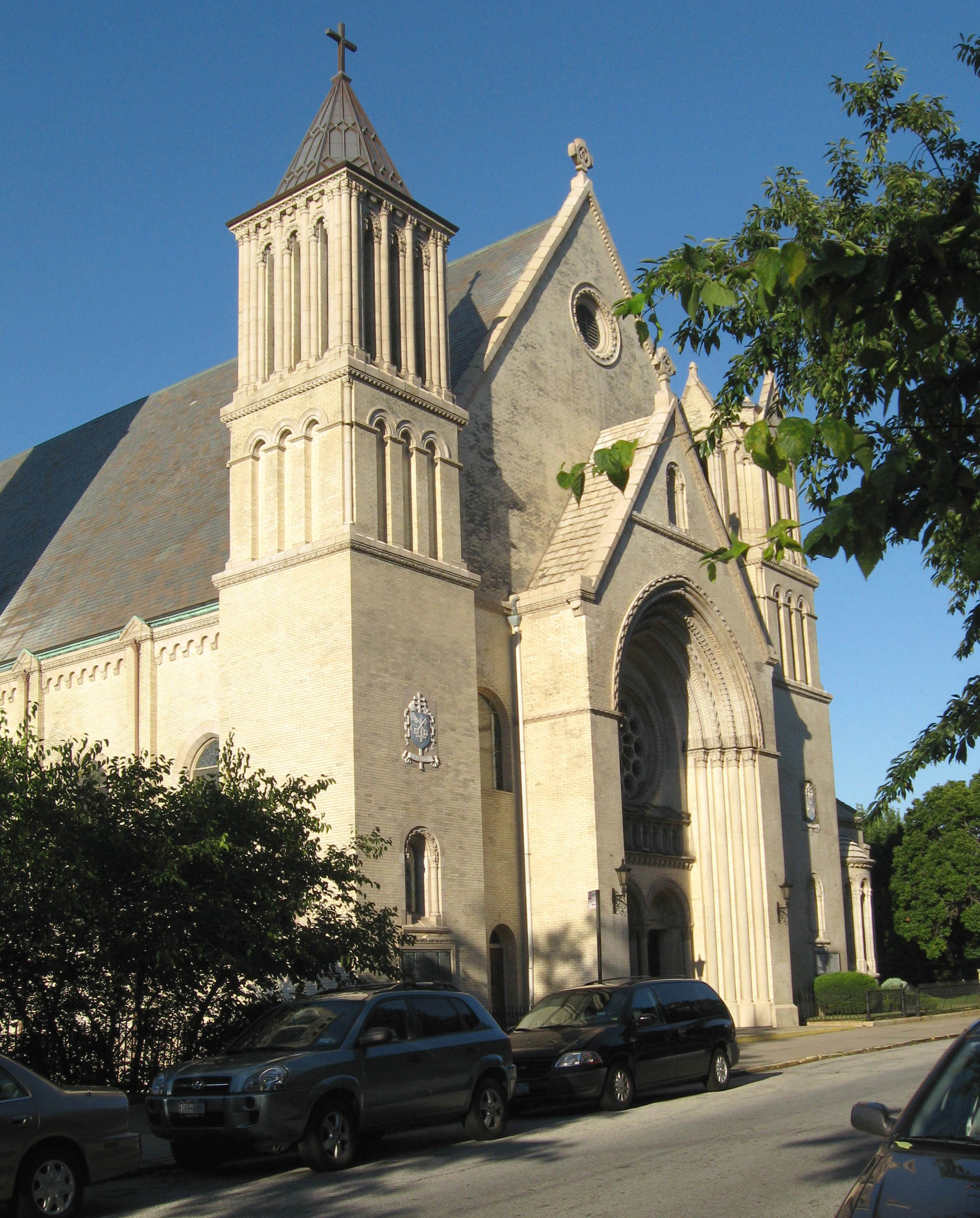
St. Peter's Church, Staten Island

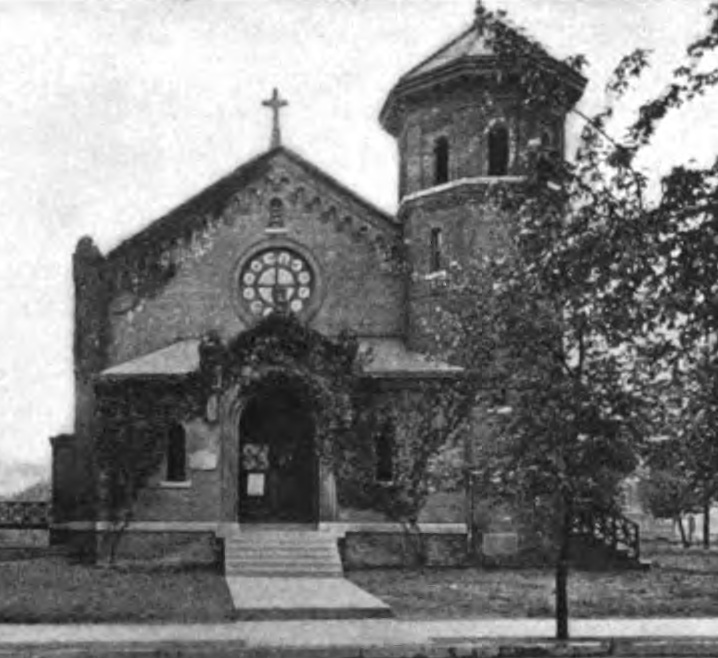
Our Lady Help of Christians Church, Staten Island

Many of these details were published by archdiocesan historian Thomas J. Shelley in 2007.

- Parish of Our Lady of Good Counsel – St. Peter – St. Paul & Assumption – Established in 2015.
  - St. Peter's Church (53 St. Mark's Place) – First Catholic church in Staten Island; established in 1839; merged in 2015.
  - Church of the Assumption (15 Webster Ave.) – Established in 1921; merged in 2007; then merged in 2015.
  - St. Paul's Church (145 Clinton Ave.) – Established in 1926; merged in 2007; then merged in 2015.
  - Our Lady of Good Counsel's Church (10 Austin Place) – Established in 1898; merged in 2015.
- St. Patrick's Church (53 St. Patrick's Place) – Established in 1862.
- Our Lady Queen of Peace Catholic Church (90 Third St.) – Established in 1922.
- Church of Our Lady Star of the Sea (5371 Amboy Rd.) – Established in 1935.
- St. Charles Church (644 Clawson St.) – Established in 1960.
- St. Clare Church (110 Nelson Ave.) – Established in 1925; largest congregation in the archdiocese.
- Church of St. Rita (281 Bradley Ave.) – Established in 1921.
- Blessed Sacrament Church (30 Manor Rd.) – Established in 1910.
- Our Lady Help of Christians Church (7396 Amboy Rd.) – Established in 1890.
- Our Lady of Pity and St. Anthony of Padua Church – Established in 2015.
  - Church of Our Lady of Pity (1616 Richmond Ave.) – Established in 1913; merged in 2015; church closed.
  - St. Anthony of Padua Church (24 Shelley Ave.) – Established in 1908; merged in 2015.
- Church of the Holy Family (366 Watchogue Rd.) – Established in 1966.
- St. Adalbert – St. Roch Parish – Established in 2015.
  - St. Adalbert's Church (337 Morningstar Rd.) – Established in 1901; merged in 2015.
  - St. Roch's Church (602 Richmond Ave.) – Established in 1922; merged in 2015.
- Sacred Heart Church (981 Castleton Ave.) – Established in 1875.
- Church of St. Teresa of the Infant Jesus (1634 Victory Blvd.) – Established in 1953.
- St. Ann's Church (101 Cromwell Ave.) – Established in 1914.
- Our Lady of Mount Carmel – St. Benedicta – St. Mary of the Assumption Church – Established in 2015.
  - Our Lady of Mount Carmel (1265 Castleton Ave.) – Established in 1913; merged in 2015.
  - St. Benedicta (244 Broadway) – Established in 1922; merged in 1957; demolished in 1960.
  - St. Mary of the Assumption (2230 Richmond Terrace) – Established in 1877; merged in 2015; deconsecrated in 2017.
- Parish of St. Joseph – St. Thomas – St. John Neumann – Established in 2017.
  - St. Joseph's Church (16 Poplar Ave.) – Established in 1855; merged in 1959.
  - Church of St. Thomas the Apostle (6097 Amboy Rd.) – Established in 1938; merged in 1959.
  - Church of St. John Neumann (1380 Arthur Kill Rd.) – Established in 1982; merged in 2017.
- St. Joseph and St. Mary Immaculate Church – Established in 2015.
  - St. Joseph's Church (466 Tompkins Ave.) – Established in 1902; merged in 2015; distinct from the St. Joseph's Church of 1855.
  - Immaculate Conception Church (128 Targee St.) – Established in 1887; merged in 2015.
  - St. Mary's Church (1101 Bay St.) – Established in 1852; merged in 2015.
- Church of the Holy Child (4747 Amboy Rd.) – Established in 1966.
- Church of St. Christopher and St. Margaret Mary (130 Midland Ave.) – Established in 2015.
  - St. Christopher Church – Established in 1926; merged in 2015.
  - St. Margaret Mary Church (560 Lincoln Ave.) – Established in 1926; merged in 2015.

=== Roman Catholic Churches in the Hudson Valley ===
==== Churches in Dutchess County ====
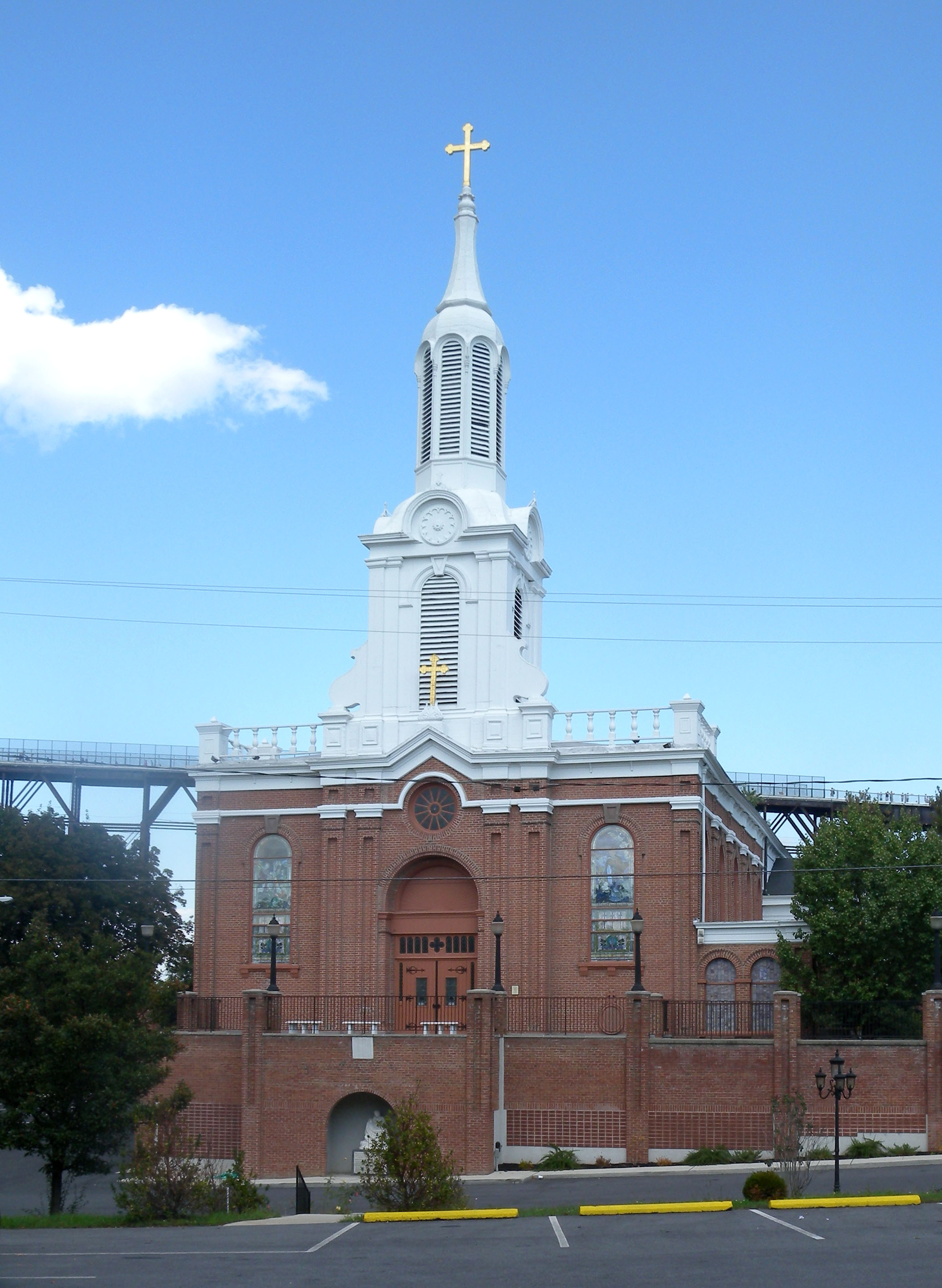
Our Lady of Carmel Church, Poughkeepsie

- Chapel of Our Lady of the Way (Hyde Park) Located on the Hyde Park campus of the Culinary Institute of America.^{†}
- Church of the Holy Trinity (Poughkeepsie) – Established in 1921.
- Immaculate Conception/St. Anthony's Church – Established in 2015.
  - Immaculate Conception Church (Amenia) – Established in 1866. Merged in 2015.
  - Church of St. Anthony (Pine Plains) – Established in 1958; mission church of Immaculate Conception (1913–1958). Merged in 2015. Church closed.
  - Chapel of St. Patrick (Millerton) – Established in 1867. Merged in 2015. Desacralized in 2017.
- Church of Regina Coeli (Hyde Park) – Established in 1864.
  - Chapel of St. Paul (Staatsburg) – Established in 1887. Part of Regina Coeli Church.
- St. Paul the Evangelist – St. Charles Borromeo Parish
  - Church of St. Charles Borromeo (Dover Plains) – Established in 1936; formerly a mission of Immaculate Conception in Amenia (1866–1885) – Merged with St. John.
  - Church of St. John the Evangelist (Pawling) – Established in 1885; formerly a mission of Immaculate Conception in Amenia (1869–1885). – Merged with St. Charles.
- St. Columba Catholic Church (Hopewell Junction) – Established in 1992; former mission of St. Denis.
- Church of St. Denis (Hopewell Junction) – Established in 1899; formerly a mission of St. Mary in Wappingers Falls (1874–1899).
- St. Joachim – St. John the Evangelist Parish
  - Church of St. John the Evangelist (Beacon) – Merged with St. Joachim
  - Church of St. Joachim (Beacon) – Merged with St. John
- St. Joseph – Immaculate Conception Catholic Church – Established in 2015.
  - Church of St. Joseph (Millbrook) – Established in 1890; formerly a mission of Immaculate Conception in Amenia (1870–1890). Merged in 2015.
  - Immaculate Conception Church (Bangall) – Merged in 2015.
  - St. Joseph's Chapel (Clinton Corners) – Merged in 2015.
- Saint Kateri Tekakwitha Church (LaGrangeville) – Established in 2002; previously mission of St. Columba in Hopewell Junction (1998–2002).
- Church of St. Martin de Porres Parish (Poughkeepsie) – Established in 1852; formerly known as Church of the Nativity (1852–1962).
- St. Mary, Mother of the Church (Fishkill) – Established in 1953; previously mission of St. Joachim Church in Beacon (1861–1953).
- Church of St. Mary (Wappingers Falls) – Established in 1845.
- St. Peter's Parish (Poughkeepsie) – Established in 1837, known as the mother church of the Hudson Valley.
- Church of St. Stanislaus Kostka (Pleasant Valley) – Established in 1903; formerly staffed by the Society of Jesus.
- St. Christopher/St. Sylvia & Good Shepherd/St. Joseph Parish – Established in 2015.
  - St. Mary's Church (Poughkeepsie) – Established in 1873. Merged in 2015. Church closed
  - Our Lady of Mt. Carmel Church (Poughkeepsie)– Established in 1908. Merged in 2015. Church closed
  - Good Shepherd Church (Rhinebeck) – Established in 1903; Merged in 2015.
  - St. Joseph's Church (Rhinebeck) – Established in 1862, became mission church of Good Shepherd in 1975. Church closed
  - St. Christopher Church (Red Hook) – Established in 1910. Merged in 2015.
  - St. Sylvia Church (Tivoli) – Established in 1890. Merged in 2015. Church closed

==== Churches in Orange County ====
- Our Lady of Mount Carmel Church (Middletown) – Staffed by the Carmelite Fathers.
- Church of St. Anastasia (Harriman) – Established in 1899.
- St. Columba Parish (Chester) – Established in 1881; formerly a mission of St. John the Evangelist in Goshen (1875–1881).
- St. Mother Teresa of Calcutta Parish.
  - Church of St. Francis of Assisi (Newburgh) – Established in 1909.
  - Sacred Heart Church
- Church of St. John the Evangelist (Goshen) – Established in 1849.
- Parish Family of St. Joseph and & St. Stanislaus
  - Church of St. Joseph (Florida) – Established in 1894. Merged with St. Stanislaus
  - Parish Mission St. Stanislaus (Pine Island) – Established in 1924; formerly a mission of St. Joseph in Florida (1912–1924). Merged with St. Joseph
  - Chapel of St. Andrew Bobola (Pellets Island) – Established in 1945. Chapel closed.
- Church of St. Joseph (Middletown) – Established in 1865.^{†}
- St. Mary's Church (Washingtonville)
- Parish of Sacred Heart-St. Patrick
  - Church of St. Patrick (Highland Mills) – Established in 1957; formerly a mission of St. Anastasia (1902–1957). Merged with Sacred Heart.
  - Church of the Sacred Heart (Monroe) – Established in 1957; formerly a mission of St. Columba in Chester (1881–1957). Merged with St. Patrick.
- St. Paul's Roman Catholic Church (Bullville) – Staffed by the Carmelite Fathers.
- St. Stephen the First Martyr Church (Warwick) – Established in 1865.
- Holy Cross Parish.
  - Holy Cross Church (Middletown) – Established in 1999; formerly a mission of Our Lady of Mount Carmel Church in Middletown (1912–1999).
  - Our Lady of the Scapular Chapel (Unionville) – Established in 1948; formerly a mission of Our Lady of Mount Carmel Church in Middletown (1948–1999). Closed in 2020.
- Holy Name of Jesus Church (Otisville) – Established in 1969.
- Holy Rosary Church (Greenwood Lake) – Established in 1954; formerly a mission of St. Stephen in Warwick (1925–1954).
- Parish of the Immaculate Conception
  - Church of the Immaculate Conception (Port Jervis) – Established in 1851; formerly a mission of St. Patrick in Newburgh (1841–1851). Also known as St. Mary's.
- Church of the Most Sacred Heart (Port Jervis) – Closed in 2007.
- Church of the Infant Saviour (Pine Bush) – Established in 1951; formerly a mission of Most Precious Blood in Walden.
  - Chapel of Our Lady of the Valley (Walker Valley) – Merged with Infant Saviour.
- Most Precious Blood Parish
  - Church of the Most Precious Blood (Walden) – Established in 1893 and suppressed in 1894; reestablished in 1912. Formerly a mission of Holy Name of Mary in Montgomery (1872–1893, 1894–1912).
  - Chapel of St. Benedict (Wallkill) – Merged with Most Precious Blood.
- Sacred Heart Catholic Church (Newburgh) – Established in 1913.
- Sacred Heart of Jesus Church
  - Church of the Sacred Heart of Jesus (Highland Falls) – Established in 1870.
  - Chapel of the Blessed Sacrament (Fort Montgomery)
- Holy Name of Mary – Assumption Church – Established in 2015.
  - Holy Name of Mary Church (Montgomery) – Established in 1872; formerly a mission of St. John the Evangelist in Goshen (1868–1872). Merged in 2015.
  - Church of the Assumption (Maybrook) – Merged in 2015, church closed.
- St. Marianne Cope Parish
  - St. Thomas of Canterbury Church (Cornwall-on-Hudson) – Established in 1870; formerly a mission of St. Patrick in Newburgh (1856–1870). Merged in 2015.
  - Church of St. Joseph (New Windsor) – Established in 1962. Merged in 2015.
- St. Patricks, St. Marys, Our Lady of the Lake Parish – Established in 2015.^{†}
  - Church of St. Patrick & St. Mary (Newburgh)– Merged in 2015.
  - Chapel of Our Lady of the Lake (Orange Lake) – Established in 1937, merged in 2015.

==== Churches in Putnam County ====
- Our Lady of Loretto Church (Cold Spring) – Established in 1834.
  - Chapel of St. Joseph (Garrison) – Established in 1871. Merged with Our Lady.
- St. James the Apostle and Our Lady of the Lake Mount Carmel Parish
  - St. James the Apostle Church (Carmel) – Established in 1909. Merged with Our Lady.
  - Our Lady of the Lake/Mount Carmel Chapel (Lake Carmel) – Established in 1936; former mission of St. John the Evangelist in Mahopac (1936–1947). Merged with St. James.
- Church of St. John the Evangelist (Mahopac) – Established in 1889; formerly a mission of St. Joseph in Croton Falls (1866–1889).
  - Chapel of Our Lady Queen of Angels (Mahopac) Chapel closed.
- St. Lawrence – Sacred Heart Parish
  - Church of St. Lawrence O'Toole (Brewster) – Established in 1877; formerly a mission of St. Joseph Church in Croton Falls (1871–1877).
  - Church of the Sacred Heart of Jesus (Patterson) – Established in 1957; formerly a mission of St. Lawrence O'Toole Church in Brewster (1934–1957).

==== Churches in Rockland County ====
- Church of the Immaculate Conception (Stony Point) – Established in 1982.
- Parish of St. John Henry Newman.
  - Our Lady of the Sacred Heart Church (Tappan) – Established in 1952. Merged with St. John.
  - St. John the Baptist Church (Piermont) – Established in 1852. Merged with Our Lady.
- St. Aedan Catholic Church (Pearl River) – Established in 1966; formerly a mission of St. Margaret Church in Pearl River (1965–1966).
- St. Anthony Parish (Nanuet) – Established in 1904; formerly a mission of St. Paul Church in Congers (1899–1904).
- Church of St. Augustine (New City) – Established in 1957; formerly a mission of St. Anthony Church in Nanuet (1907–1957).
- St. Catherine of Alexandria Parish (Blauvelt) – Established in 1869.
- St. Francis of Assisi Church (West Nyack) – Established in 1964.
- St. Gregory Barbarigo Church (Garnerville) – Established in 1961.
- Church of St. Joseph and St. Boniface.
  - Church of St. Joseph (Spring Valley) – Established in 1893.
  - Church of St. Boniface (Wesley Hills) – Established in 1966. Church closed.
- Church of St. Margaret's (Pearl River)
- Sacred Heart Catholic Church (Suffern) – Established in 1868; formerly known as St. Rose of Lima.
- St. Peter and St. Mary Church (Haverstraw).
  - St. Peter Church – Established in 1848.
  - St. Mary Church
- Parish of St. Joan of Arc – Our Lady of Mount Carmel (Sloatsburg).– Established in 2015.
  - Church of Our Lady of Mount Carmel (Tuxedo Park) – Established in 1895. Merged in 2015.
  - St. Joan of Arc Church (Sloatsburg) – Established in 1895. Merged in 2015.
- Parish of St. Paul and of St. Ann – Established in 2015
  - St. Paul Church (Congers) – Merged in 2015.
  - St. Ann Church (Nyack) – Merged in 2015.

==== Churches in Sullivan County ====
- Our Lady of the Assumption Church (Bloomingburg) – Staffed by the Carmelite Fathers.
- St. Aloysius and Gate of Heaven Parish
  - Church of St. Aloysius (Livingston Manor) – Established in 1899; mission of St. Peter in Liberty (1896–1899).
  - Chapel of the Gate of Heaven (Roscoe) – Established in 1901.
  - Chapel of the Sacred Heart (DeBruce) – Established in 1906.
- Saint Francis Xavier Parish
  - St. Xavier Church (Narrowsburg) – Established in 1932. Staffed by the Franciscan Friars.
  - Our Lady of the Lake Church (Lake Huntington) – Established in 1919.
- Church of St. George–St. Francis – Established in 1981; formerly staffed by the Franciscan Friars (1880–2004).
  - St. George Church (Jeffersonville) – Established as a mission of Holy Cross Church in Callicoon in 1880.
  - St. Francis Church (Youngsville) – Established as a mission of Holy Cross in Callicoon in 1908.
- Church of St. Joseph (Wurtsboro) – Established in 1880; mission of St. Andrew Church in Ellenville (1849–1880).
- Church of St. Mary (Obernburg) – Established in 1854; staffed by the Franciscan Friars (1895–present).
- St. Peter's Roman Catholic Church (Liberty)
- Church of St. Peter
  - Church of St. Peter (Monticello) – Established in 1874; mission of St. Andrew Church in Ellenville (1864–1874).
  - St. Anne's Mission Church (White Lake) – Established in 1913. Merged with St. Peter.
  - St. Joseph Mission Church (Mongaup Valley) – Established in 1899. Merged with St. Peter.
- Holy Cross and St. Patrick Church
  - Church of the Holy Cross (Callicoon) – Established in 1876; staffed by the Franciscan Friars (1895–present).
  - Chapel of St. Patrick (Long Eddy) – Established in 1904. Chapel closed.
- Immaculate Conception Church (Woodbourne) – Established in 1957; mission of St. Andrew in Ellenville (1898–1957).
- Parish of Saint Anthony of Padua and of Saint Thomas Aquinas (Yulan) – Established in 2015; staffed by the Franciscan Friars.

==== Churches in Ulster County ====
- Our Lady of Fatima Church (Plattekill) – Established in 1960; mission of St. Joseph in New Paltz. Formerly staffed by the Theatine Fathers.
- St. Augustine Church (Highland) – Formerly a mission of St. James in Milton (1899–??).
- St. Charles Borromeo Church (Gardiner) – Established in 1882 and suppressed in 1885; reestablished in 1892 and suppressed in 1929; reestablished in 1976. Formerly a mission of St. James in Milton (1885–1892) and a mission of St. Joseph in New Windsor (1929–1976).
- St. John/St. Francis de Sales Parish.
  - St. Francis de Sales Church (Phoenicia) – Established in 1902; formerly staffed by the La Salette Fathers (1902–2004). Merged with St. John's.
  - St. John's Church (Woodstock) – Established in 1860. Merged with St. Francis.
  - St. Augustine Chapel (West Shokan).
- St. John the Evangelist Parish.
  - St. John the Evangelist Church (Saugerties).
  - St. Mary of the Snow Church (Saugerties) – Established 2015.
  - St. Joseph Church (Glasco)
- Church of St. Joseph (Kingston) – Established in 1868.
- St. Joseph Church (New Paltz) – Established in 1929; formerly a mission of St. Charles Borromeo in Gardiner (1892–1929). Staffed by the Capuchin Friars.
- Church of St. Mary, St. Andrew, Our Lady of Lourdes Mission Parish
  - St. Mary and St. Andrew Church (Ellenville) – Established in 1956 from the merger of St. Mary and St. Andrew Churches.
  - Chapel of Our Lady of Lourdes (Kerhonkson) – Established in 1957.
- Church of St. Peter (Rosendale) – Established in 1860.
  - Chapel of Our Lady Help of Christians (High Falls) – Closed.
- Immaculate Conception Catholic Church (Kingston) – Established in 1896.
- Parish of St. Catherine Labouré and St. Colman.
  - St. Catherine Labouré Church (Lake Katrine)
  - St. Colman Church (East Kingston)
  - Chapel of St. Anne (Sawkill) – Established in 1905 and suppressed in 1972; formerly a mission of St. Joseph in Kingston.
- Presentation – Sacred Heart Parish (Port Ewen) – Established in 2015; staffed by the Redemptorist Fathers (1913–present).
  - Presentation of the Blessed Virgin Mary Church (Port Ewen) – Merged in 2015.
  - Sacred Heart Church (Esopus) – Merged in 2015.
- St. Mary's Parish – Established in 2015
  - St. Mary's Church (Marlboro) – formerly a mission of the Presentation of the B.V.M. in Port Ewen and of St. James in Milton (1867–1900). Merged in 2015.
  - Our Lady of Mercy Church (Roseton) – Established in 1887; formerly a mission of St. James in Milton (1887–1900). Merged in 2015.
- St. Mary – St. Peter Church – Established in 2015.
  - St. Mary Church (Kingston) – Merged in 2015.
  - St. Peter Church (Kingston) – Merged in 2015.

==== Churches in Westchester County ====
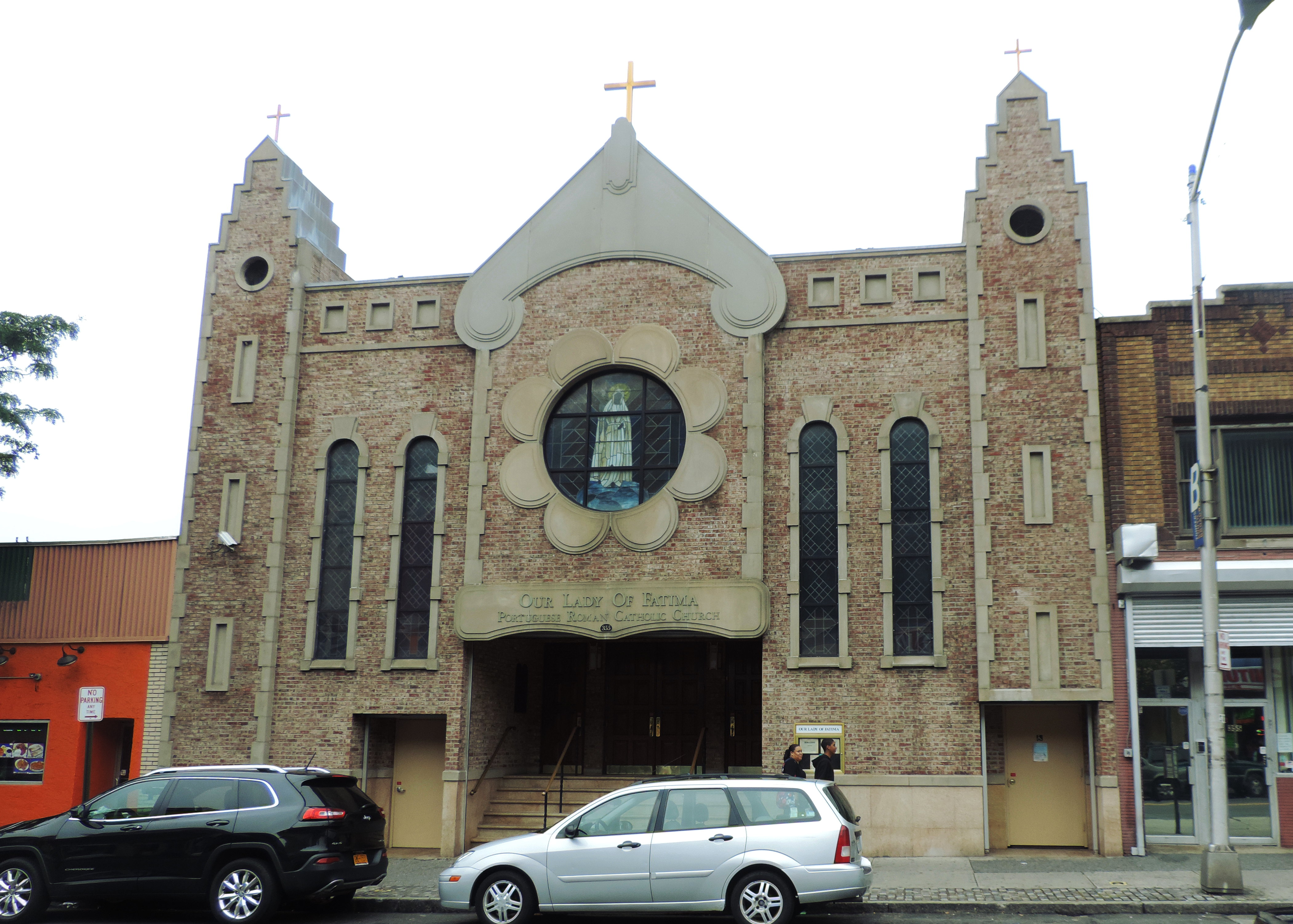
Our Lady of Fatima Church, Yonkers

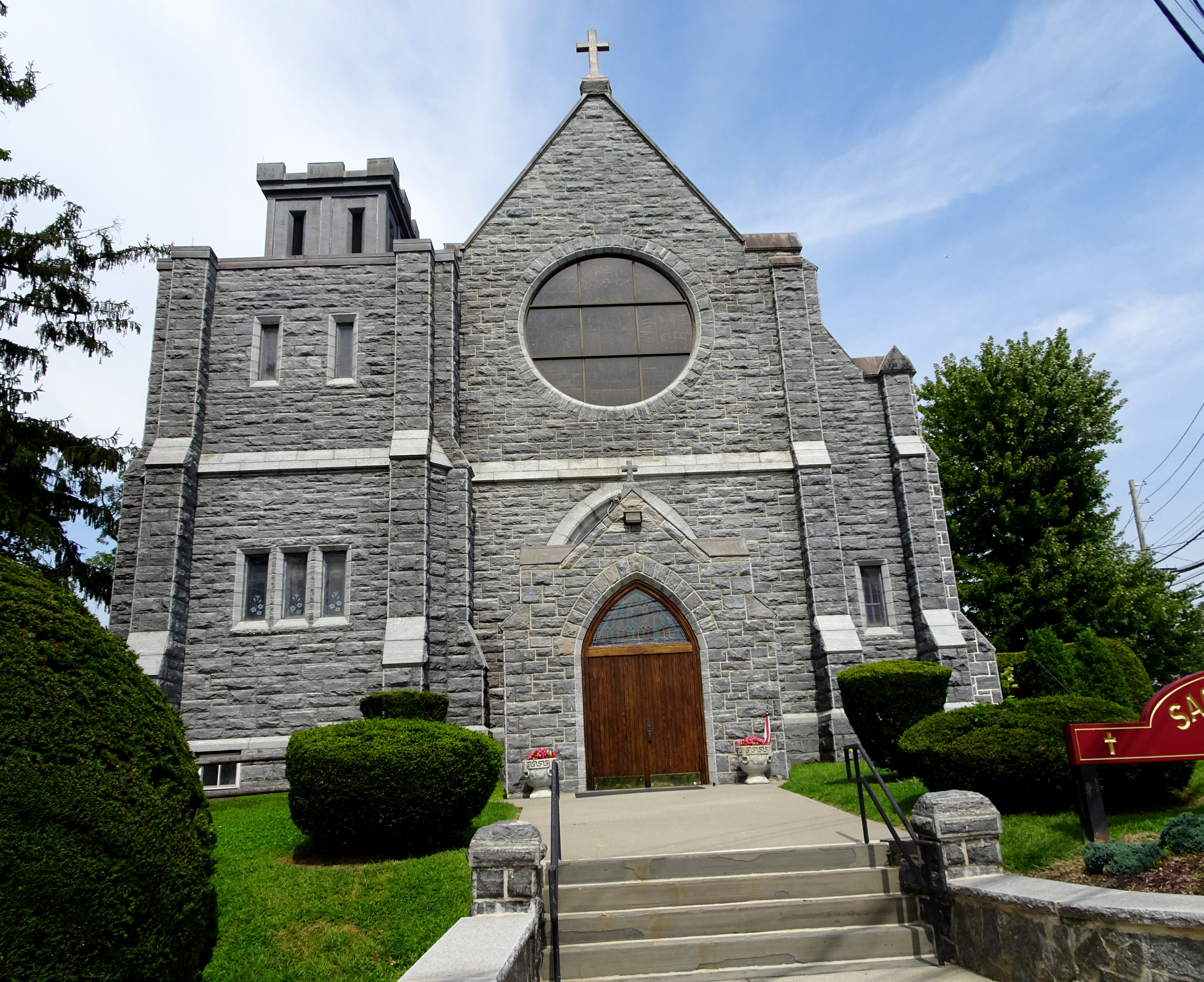
Sacred Heart Church, Dobbs Ferry

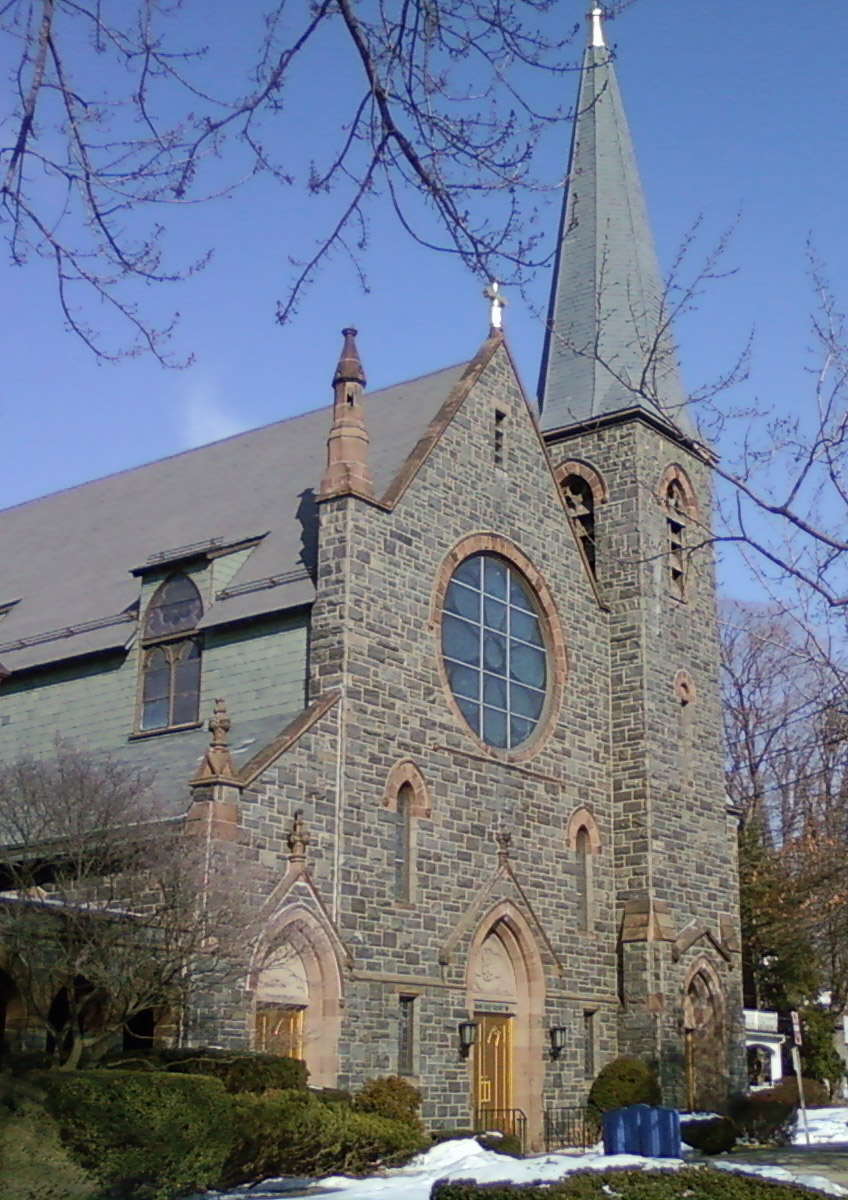
Most Holy Trinity Church, Mamaroneck

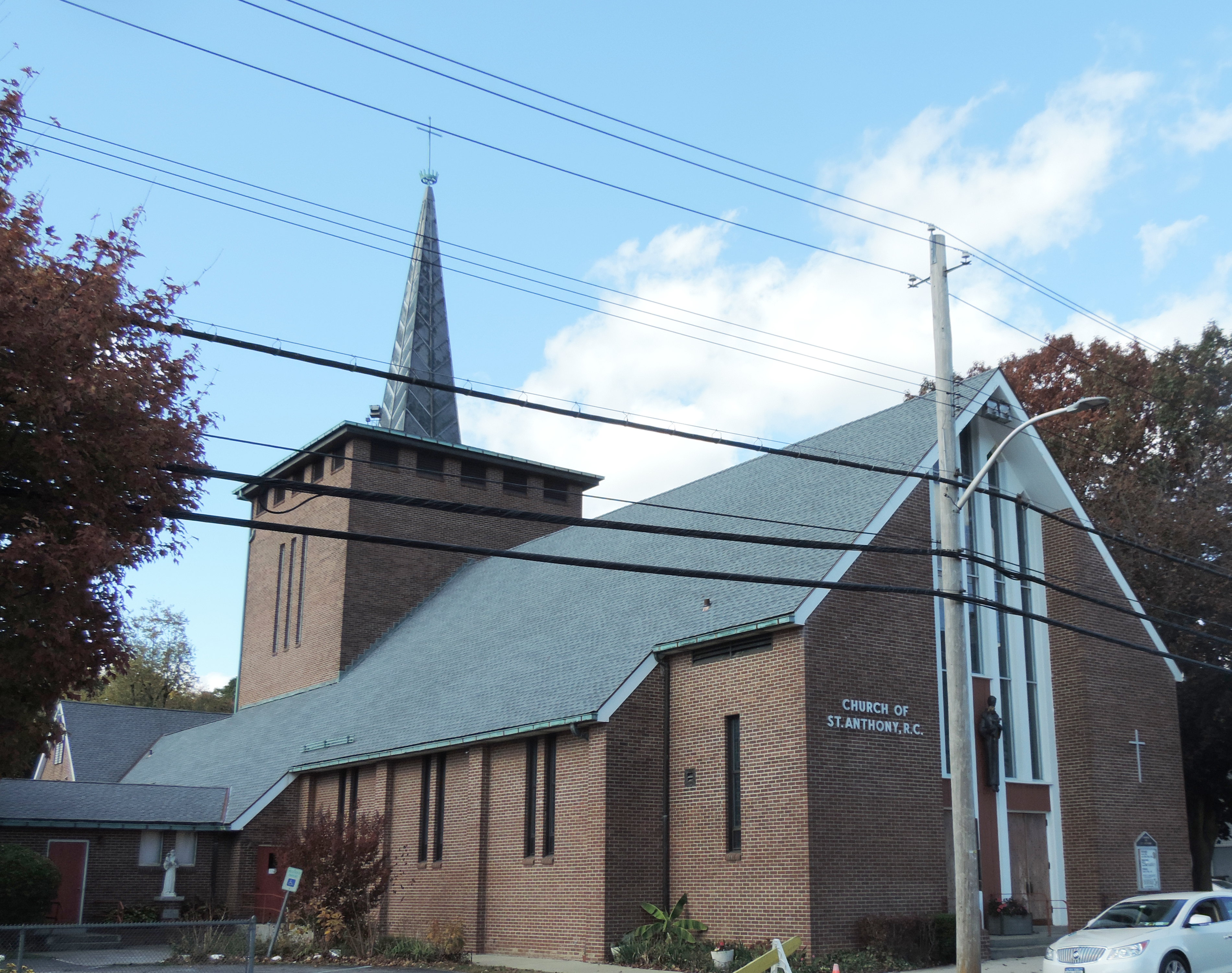
St Anthony Church, Yonkers

- Church of the Assumption (Peekskill) – Established in 1859.
- Blessed Sacrament Church (New Rochelle) – Established in 1848 as a mission; converted in 1853 to a parish. Formerly named St. Matthew Church (1848–1875) and located on Drake's Lane.
- Christ the King Church (Yonkers) – Established in 1927.
- Church of the Holy Family (New Rochelle) – Established in 1913.
- Holy Innocents Parish.
  - Church of the Holy Innocents (Pleasantville) – Established in 1894; staffed by the Dominican Fathers (1897–present).
  - Chapel of Our Lady of Pompeii (Pleasantville) – Established in 1918.
- Holy Name of Jesus Church (New Rochelle).
- Holy Name of Jesus Church (Valhalla) – Established in 1896; formerly staffed by the Dominican Fathers (1896–1998).
- Holy Name of Mary Catholic Church (Croton-on-Hudson) – Established in 1877.
  - Chapel of the Good Shepherd (Croton-on-Hudson) – Mission established in 1929. Chapel closed.
- Holy Rosary Roman Catholic Church (Hawthorne).
- Church of the Holy Spirit (Cortlandt Manor) Established in 1966.
- Immaculate Conception Church (Irvington) – Established in 1873.
- St. Marys of the Immaculate Conception Church (Yonkers) – Established in 1848.^{†}
- Church of Immaculate Heart of Mary (Scarsdale) – Established in 1912.
- Church of the Magdalene (Tarrytown) – Established in 1894.
- St. Vito-Most Holy Trinity Parish – Established in 2015.
  - Church of the Most Holy Trinity (Mamaroneck) – Built 1885–1886.
  - Church of St. Vito (Mamaroneck) – Built 1930 (building severely damaged in 2021 flood).
- Lady of Fatima Portuguese Roman Catholic Church (Yonkers) – Established in 1980.
- Church of Our Lady of Mount Carmel (Elmsford) – Established in 1912.
- Our Lady of Mount Carmel Church (Yonkers) – Staffed by the Pallotine Fathers.
- Our Lady of Shkodra Albanian Catholic Church (Hartsdale) – Established in 1999.
- Our Lady of Sorrows Parish (White Plains).
- Church of Our Lady of Victory – Sacred Heart Church – Established in 2015.
  - Church of Our Lady of Victory (Mount Vernon)– Established in 1871 and known as St. Jacob Church until 1894. Merged in 2015. Church is closed
  - Church of the Sacred Heart (Mount Vernon) – Established in 1872; formerly a mission of St. Raymond in the Bronx (1849–1872). Formerly named St. Matthew Church (1849–1872). Merged in 2015.*
  - Church of Our Lady of the Rosary/Holy Rosary (Port Chester) – Staffed by the Salesian Fathers of Don Bosco. Closed, merged in 2015.
- Church of the Resurrection (Rye) – Established in 1880.
- Church of the Sacred Heart (Hartsdale).
- Monastery Church of the Sacred Heart (Yonkers) – Established in 1891; staffed by the Capuchin Friars.
- Church of St. Ann (Ossining).
- Church of St. Anthony (Yonkers) – Established in 1923.
- Church of St. Anthony of Padua (West Harrison) – Formerly a mission of St. John and St. Mary in Chappaqua (1926–1929) and of Our Lady of Sorrows in White Plains (1929–?).
- Catholic Community of Larchmont.
  - Church of St. Augustine (Larchmont) – Established in 1891. Merged with Sts. John and Paul
  - Church of Sts. John and Paul (Larchmont) – Established in 1949. . Merged with St. Augustine.
- St. Augustine Church (Ossining) – Established in 1853.
- Church of St. Bartholomew (Yonkers) – Staffed by the Missionary Society of St. Paul Fathers.
- Church of St. Bernard (White Plains).
- St. Casimir Roman Catholic Church (Yonkers) – Established in 1899; staffed by the Pauline Fathers.
- St. Columbanus Catholic Church (Cortlandt Manor) – Established in 1950.^{†}
  - Chapel of the North American Martyrs (Lake Peekskill) – Established in 1937; formerly a mission of St. Patrick in Yorktown Heights (1937–50), Administered by St. Columbanus Parish in Cortlandt Manor.
- St. Elizabeth Ann Seton Church (Shrub Oak).
- Church of St. Eugene (Yonkers) – Established in 1949.
- St. Francis of Assisi Parish (Mount Kisco) – Established in 1871; formerly a mission of St. Joseph in Croton Falls (1862–1871).
- St. Gregory the Great Church (Harrison).
- Church of St. John and St. Mary (Chappaqua).
- Parish of St. John the Baptist – Most Holy Trinity – St. Ann – Established in 2023.
  - Church of St. John the Baptist (Yonkers) – Established in 1903. merged with Most Holy Trinity in 2015.
  - Church of the Most Holy Trinity (Yonkers) – Established in 1894, merged with John the Baptist in 2015.
  - Church of St. Ann (Yonkers) – Established in 1929. Merged with St. John/Holy Trinity in 2023.
- Church of St. Joseph (Bronxville) – Established in 1922.
- St. Joseph's Catholic Church (Somers) – Established in 1845. Formerly located in Croton Falls, relocated to Somers in 2013.
  - Chapel of St. Michael the Archangel (Goldens Bridge) – Established in 1896. Closed in 2014.
  - Chapel of St. John (North Salem) – Established in 1916. Closed in 2014.
- Church of St. Joseph (Yonkers) – Established in 1871.
- Church of St. Mary – Our Lady of Carmel – Established in 2015.
  - Church of St. Mary (Mount Vernon) – Established in 1894. Merged in 2015.
  - Church of Our Lady of Mount Carmel (Mount Vernon) – Established in 1897; formerly staffed by the Franciscan Friars. Closed, merged in 2015.
- St. Mary of the Assumption Church (Katonah) – Established in 1908; formerly a mission of St. Joseph in Croton Falls (1889–1908).
  - Chapel of St. Matthias (Bedford Hills) – Administered by the Parish of St. Mary of the Assumption in Katonah.
- St. Patrick's Church (Bedford).
- St. Patrick's Church (Yorktown Heights) – Established in 1898; formerly named St. Peter Church (1898–1933).
- St. Patrick in Armonk Church (Armonk) – Established in 1966; formerly a mission of St. John & St. Mary in Chappaqua (1924–1966).
- St. Paul the Apostle Parish (Yonkers) – Established in 1923.^{†}
- St. Peter – St. Denis Church – Established in 2015.
  - Church of St. Peter (Yonkers) – Established in 1894. Merged in 2015.
  - Church of St. Denis (Yonkers) – closed, merged in 2015.
- Church of Saint Pius X (Scarsdale) – Established in 1954. Formerly staffed by diocesan priests, currently staffed by the Religious Community of the Disciples of Mary.
- St. Teresa of Avila Church (Sleepy Hollow) – Established in 1853.
  - Church of the Holy Cross (Sleepy Hollow) – Established in 1922; formerly a mission of Most Holy Trinity in Yonkers (1910–1922). Administered by St. Teresa of Avila Church. Closed in 2015.
- Parish of St. Theresa of the Infant Jesus (Briarcliff Manor) – Established in 1926.
  - Chapel of Our Lady of the Wayside (Millwood) – Established in 1924; formerly a mission of St. John & St. Mary in Chappaqua (1924–1926).
- Sts. Peter and Paul and St. Ursula Church – Established in 2015.
  - Church of Sts. Peter and Paul (Mount Vernon) – Established in 1929. Merged in 2015.
  - Church of St. Ursula (Mount Vernon) – Closed, merged in 2015.
- Church of the Transfiguration (Tarrytown) – Established in 1896; staffed by the Carmelite Fathers.
- Church of St. Christopher and of St. Patrick – Established in 2015.
  - St. Christopher Church (Buchanan) – Established in 1929, merged in 2015.
  - St. Patrick Church (Verplanck) – Established in 1843. Merged in 2015.
- Our Lady of Perpetual Help – St. Catharine Parish – Established in 2015.
  - Our Lady of Perpetual Help Church (Pelham Manor) – Merged in 2015.
  - St. Catharine Church (Pelham Manor) – Merged in 2015.
- St. Gabriel and of St. Joseph Catholic Church – Established in 2015.
  - St. Gabriel Church (New Rochelle) – Established in 1895. Merged in 2015.
  - St. Joseph Church (New Rochelle) – Established in 1901. Merged in 2015.
- Parish of Immaculate Conception and of Assumption – Established in 2015.
  - Immaculate Conception Church (Tuckahoe) – Established in 1878; formerly a mission of Blessed Sacrament in New Rochelle (1853–1878). Merged in 2015.
  - Church of the Assumption (Tuckahoe) – Established in 1911; administered by Immaculate Conception Church. Merged in 2015.
- Parish of Annunciation and of Our Lady of Fatima – Established in 2015.
  - Annunciation Church (Crestwood) – Established in 1931, merged in 2015.
  - Church of Our Lady of Fatima (Scarsdale) – Established in 1948. Merged in 2015.
- Parish of St. Matthew and of Our Lady of Perpetual Help – Established in 2015.
  - St. Matthew Church (Hastings-on-Hudson) – Merged in 2015.
  - Our Lady of Perpetual Help (Ardsley) – Merged in 2015.
  - Church of St. Stanislaus Kostka (Hastings-on-Hudson) – Administered by St. Matthew Church since 1986. Closed in 2005.
- Sacred Heart and of Our Lady of Pompeii Parish – Established in 2014.
  - Sacred Heart Church (Dobbs Ferry) – Established in 1895, merged in 2014.
  - Our Lady of Pompeii Church (Dobbs Ferry) – Merged in 2014.
- Roman Catholic Church of St. John the Evangelist and of Our Lady of Mount Carmel – Established in 2015.
  - St. John the Evangelist Church (White Plains) – Merged in 2015.
  - Our Lady of Mount Carmel (White Plains) – Merged in 2015.
- Parish of St. John Bosco (Port Chester) – Established in 2017.
  - Our Lady of Mercy Church (Port Chester) – Established in 1854. Merged in 2017.
  - Corpus Christi Church (Port Chester) – Merged in 2017.
  - Our Lady of the Rosary Church (Port Chester) – Merged in 2017.
  - Sacred Heart of Jesus Church (Port Chester) – Closed, merged in 2017.

†.NOTE: Parish has permission from the archdiocese to practise the Extraordinary Form at mass.

== Eastern Rite churches in the archdiocese ==
=== Bronx ===
- St. Mary Protectress Ukrainian Autocephalous Church (1745 Washington Ave.) – Established in 1943.
- St. Thomas Syro – Malabar Catholic Forane Church (810 E 221st St) – Established in 2002.

=== Manhattan ===
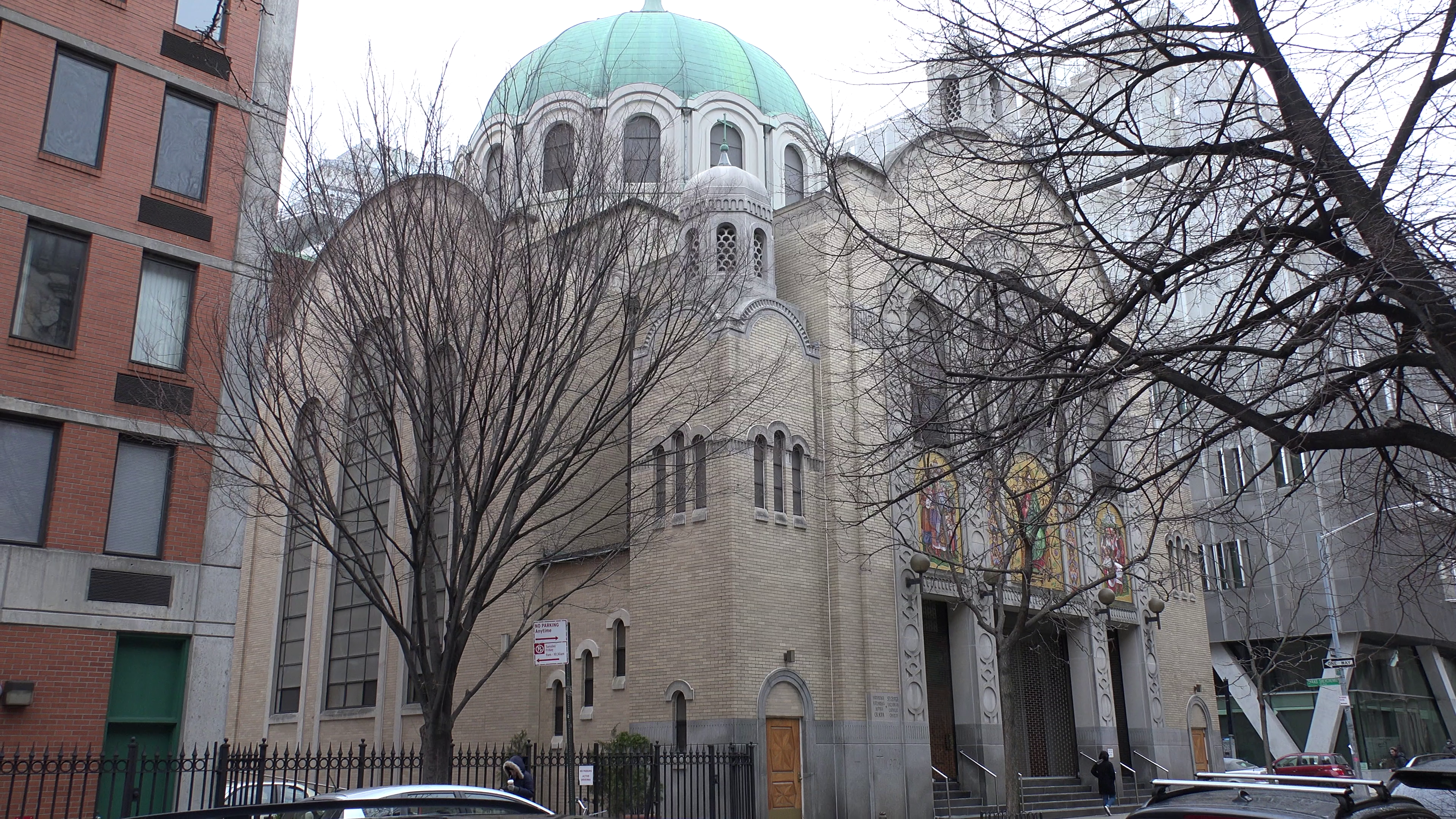
St. George Ukrainian Catholic Church, Manhattan

- Community of St. Michael Russian Byzantine Catholic Church (266 Mulberry Street) – Established in 1936.
- St. Mary Byzantine Catholic Church (246 E. 15th St.) – Established in 1912.
  - Holy Cross Hungarian Byzantine Catholic Church (E. 82nd St.) Closed 2013.
  - St. Elias Byzantine Catholic Church (Greenpoint, Brooklyn) Closed 2007
- St. George Ukrainian Catholic Church (E. 7th St.) – Established in 1905.

=== Staten Island ===
- Holy Trinity Ukrainian Catholic Church (288 Vanderbilt Ave.) – Established in 1949.

=== Orange County ===
- Saint Andrew's Ukrainian Catholic Church (Hamptonburgh) – Established in 1983.

=== Rockland County ===
- Ukrainian Church of Sts. Peter & Paul (Spring Valley) – Established in 1913.

=== Sullivan County ===
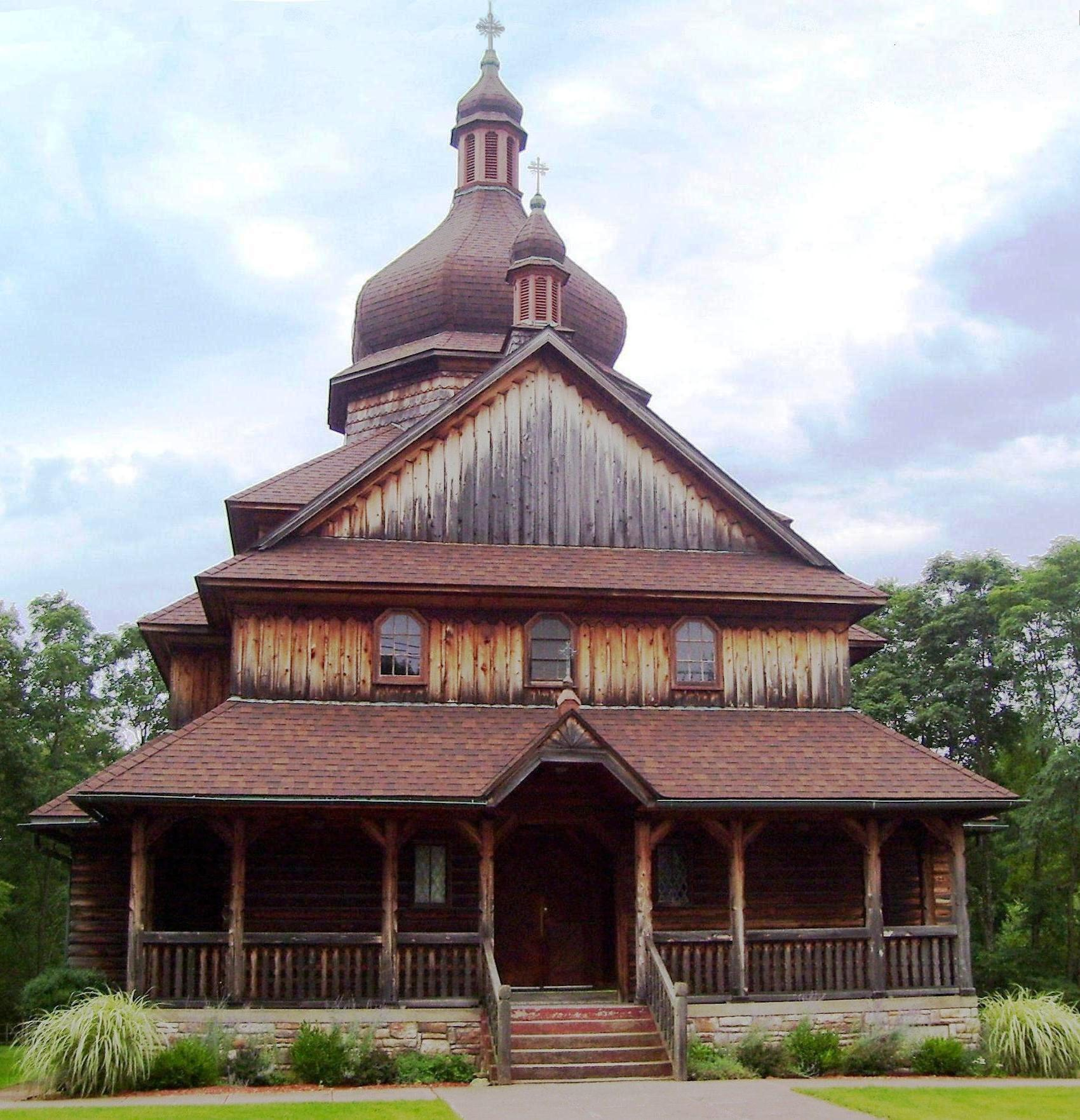
St. Volodymyr Ukrainian Greek–Catholic Church, Glen Spey

- St. Volodymyr Ukrainian Catholic Church (Glen Spey) – Established in 1961.

=== Ulster County ===
- Ukrainian Church of the Holy Trinity (Kerhonkson) – Established in 1965.

=== Westchester County ===
- St. Nicholas of Myra Byzantine Catholic Church (White Plains) – Established in 1898, current church constructed in 1987.
  - St. Nicholas of Myra Eastern Catholic Church (Yonkers) – Established in 1891. Closed in 2010
- St. John Paul II Maronite Catholic Church at Immaculate Conception (Sleepy Hollow)^{†}
  - Church of the Immaculate Conception – Established in 1957, sold in 2002 to Maronites.

== See also ==
- List of Catholic churches in the United States
