= St. Margaret Mary's Church (Bronx) =

Catholic parish church in New York, USA

Coordinates: 40°51′2.01″N 73°54′26.97″W

The Church of St. Margaret Mary
- Interactive map of the The Church of St. Margaret Mary area

General information
- Location: The Bronx, New York City, United States
- Client: Roman Catholic Archdiocese of New York

The Church of St. Margaret Mary is a Roman Catholic parish church under the authority of the Roman Catholic Archdiocese of New York, located at 1914 Morris Avenue in The Bronx, New York City. It was established in 1923 and originally occupied 1915–1917 Morris Avenue.
