= Christ the King's Church (Bronx) =

Roman Catholic church in New York City

Coordinates: 40°50′15.17″N 73°54′55.53″W

The Church of Christ the King
- Interactive map of the The Church of Christ the King area

General information
- Location: Bronx, New York City, United States of America
- Client: Roman Catholic Archdiocese of New York

Website
- https://christthekingcatholicchurch.com/

The Church of Christ the King is a Roman Catholic parish church under the authority of the Roman Catholic Archdiocese of New York, located at Grand Concourse at Marcy Place, Bronx, New York City.

== History ==
Church of Christ the King was established in 1927.
