= Our Lady of Mercy Church (Port Chester, New York) =

Catholic church in New York, US

Church of Our Lady of Mercy
- Church of Our Lady of Mercy
- 41°00′09″N 73°40′10″W
- Location: Port Chester, New York
- Denomination: Catholic Church
- Website: donboscopc.org

History
- Status: Parish church
- Founded: 1854
- Dedication: Our Lady of Mercy

Architecture
- Functional status: Active
- Style: Romanesque
- Completed: 1934

Administration
- Archdiocese: Archdiocese of New York
- Parish: Parish of St. John Bosco

The Church of Our Lady of Mercy is a Catholic church located in Port Chester, New York. Having been founded as a parish in 1834, the present church building was constructed in 1934 in the Romanesque style. It is the parish church of the Parish of St. John Bosco, which is the product of the merger of Port Chester's four Catholic parishes.

== History ==
The first congregation of Catholics in Port Chester dates to 1834, where they met in a private house attended by visiting priests from Harlem, Westchester (today part of The Bronx), and New Rochelle. In 1846, this congregation purchased a small building on Main Street to use as their church. This remained until 1852, when a new plot of land was purchased for the construction of a church.

Our Lady of Mercy Church was established as a parish on October 2, 1854, for Catholics in Port Chester, most of whom were Italian and Polish, who previously traveled to New Rochelle for mass. Its first pastor, Rev. Martin Dowling, erected a rectory, as well as a parochial school in 1863 that was staffed by the Sisters of Charity. He also purchased land for a cemetery. Dowling's successor, Rev. John A. Walters, P.R., oversaw construction of the new church, school, and rectory. The current church was built in 1934 in the Romanesque style. Its facade is made of red sandstone imported from Scotland.

While Our Lady of Mercy was previously an independent parish, the Archdiocese of New York announced in 2015 that the four parishes of Port Chester (Our Lady of Mercy, Corpus Christi, Our Lady of the Rosary, and the Sacred Heart of Jesus) would be merged into one, with Our Lady of Mercy serving as the parish church for the new Parish of St. John Bosco. This merger went into effect in 2017.

== See also ==
- List of churches in the Roman Catholic Archdiocese of New York
