= St. Angela Merici's Church (Bronx) =

Church building in New York State

Coordinates: 40°49′36.87″N 73°55′4.49″W

The Church of St. Angela Merici
- Interactive map of the The Church of St. Angela Merici area

General information
- Location: The Bronx, New York City, United States
- Client: Roman Catholic Archdiocese of New York

The Church of St. Angela Merici is a Roman Catholic parish church under the authority of the Roman Catholic Archdiocese of New York, located at 917 Morris Avenue, Bronx, New York City. It was established in 1899. It has been staffed by the Apostles of Jesus since 2000.
