= East Midtown Plaza =

Building complex in Manhattan, New York

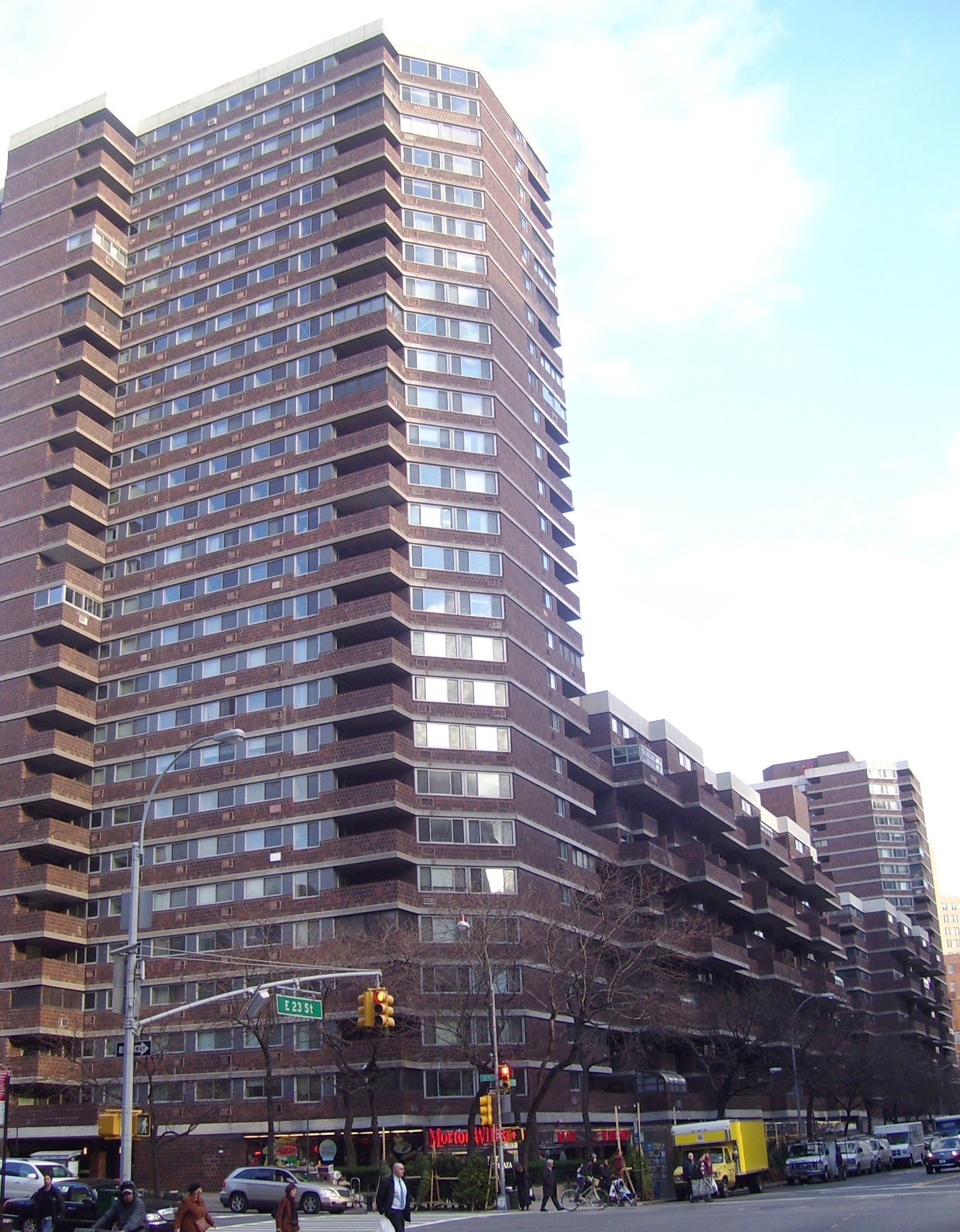
- Looking east along 23rd St. in 2012, with the tower at 401 Second Ave. in the foreground

General information
- Location: East 23rd to 25th streets between First and Second avenues, Manhattan, New York, United States
- Coordinates: 40°44′17″N 73°58′45″W
- Year built: 1968–1974

Technical details
- Floor count: 28 (319 East 24th Street); 27 (400 Second Avenue); 22 (401 First Avenue)
- Grounds: 3.5 acres (1.4 ha)

Design and construction
- Architecture firm: Davis, Brody & Associates
- Developer: East Midtown Community Housing Corporation
- Structural engineer: Robert Rosenwasser
- Services engineer: Cosentini Associates
- Other designers: M. Paul Friedberg & Associates (landscape architect)
- Main contractor: Cauldwell-Wingate Company

East Midtown Plaza is a housing cooperative development in the Kips Bay neighborhood of Manhattan, New York, United States. Developed as part of the Mitchell–Lama Housing Program, the six-building complex occupies an area of nearly two city blocks, bounded by First and Second avenues and East 23rd and 25th streets. It contains a total of 746 units spread across a mix of high-rise and low-rise apartment buildings. The development was constructed in two phases from 1968 through 1974, with the first stage opening in 1972. Since the turn of the 21st century, residents have debated privatizing the housing complex by exiting the Mitchell-Lama program.

== History ==
=== Background and construction ===
East Midtown Plaza was developed as a result of the Bellevue South Urban Renewal Project, which had been approved by the City Planning Commission and Board of Estimate in July 1964 and September 1964, respectively, and encompassed the area running between First and Second avenues from East 23rd to 30th streets in the Kips Bay neighborhood of Manhattan in New York, United States.

Although the site and sponsor of East Midtown Plaza were approved in November 1964, construction did not begin until May 1968 due to the city's need to acquire sites in the urban renewal area and relocate the residents and businesses that were displaced. The site covered an area of 3.5 acres (1.4 ha) on two city blocks, bounded by First and Second avenues and East 23rd and 25th streets. The sponsor for the housing cooperative (co-op) development was the East Midtown Community Housing Corporation, which was equally owned by seven local organizations including: Adams-Parkhurst Memorial Presbyterian Church (located at 432 Third Avenue), Carmelite Church of Our Lady of the Scapular, Community Church of New York, Congregation Talmud Torah Adereth El, Gustavas Adolphus Lutheran Church (located at 155 East 22nd Street), New York Friends Center (located at 215 East 15th Street), and the Parent-Teachers Association of Public School 116. The groups raised money to pay the initial fees and get the project started.

By July 1968, the project sponsor had received about 15,000 inquiries from prospective buyers in East Midtown Plaza, which at the time was planned to include a total of 735 apartments. Priority in purchasing apartments at the new complex was given to residents that were displaced from the urban renewal area. Designed by the architectural firm of Davis, Brody & Associates, plans for the co-op called for three high-rise buildings, five low-rise buildings (four of which were to contain duplex apartments), a 40,000-square-foot (3,700 m^{2}) shopping center, and an underground parking garage. The complex was constructed by the Cauldwell-Wingate Company in two phases: the first stage included the buildings south of East 24th Street and the second stage included the buildings north of 24th Street. The site of the second phase of construction was designated as a "holding area" and contained 12 buildings that were occupied by residents awaiting relocation to new apartments. (Note: The site plan for the project prepared by Davis, Brody & Associates identified five low-rise buildings (each containing 11 stories), but Buildings BC and DE are grouped together. The low-rises have been subsequently referred to as three buildings: 311 East 23rd Street, 333 East 23rd Street, and 320 East 25th Street.) Plans for the buildings in the first phase of the project were filed with the city in 1968, while the plans for the structures in the second phase were filed two years later.

With the approval of the city, East 24th Street was closed to through traffic between First and Second Avenues to create two cul-de-sacs with a large midblock plaza designed by M. Paul Friedberg & Associates that joined the buildings and both phases of the project. The closure of East 24th Street was planned to occur after the second phase of the project. The changes to the configuration of East 24th Street were reflected on the city map in February 1968.

As a Mitchell–Lama Housing Program project with financing aided by the city, the purchase of housing units in the complex was restricted to low- to middle-income households. Some of the original subscribers that made down payments on apartments canceled their plans to purchase units after they learned that their monthly maintenance charges would be 20 percent higher than the preliminary estimates. Increases in construction costs, particularly due to the extensive landscaping plans and the need to remove more subsurface rock in excavation than had been originally anticipated, had increased the cost of the first phase of the project by about $500,000.

=== Opening and early years ===
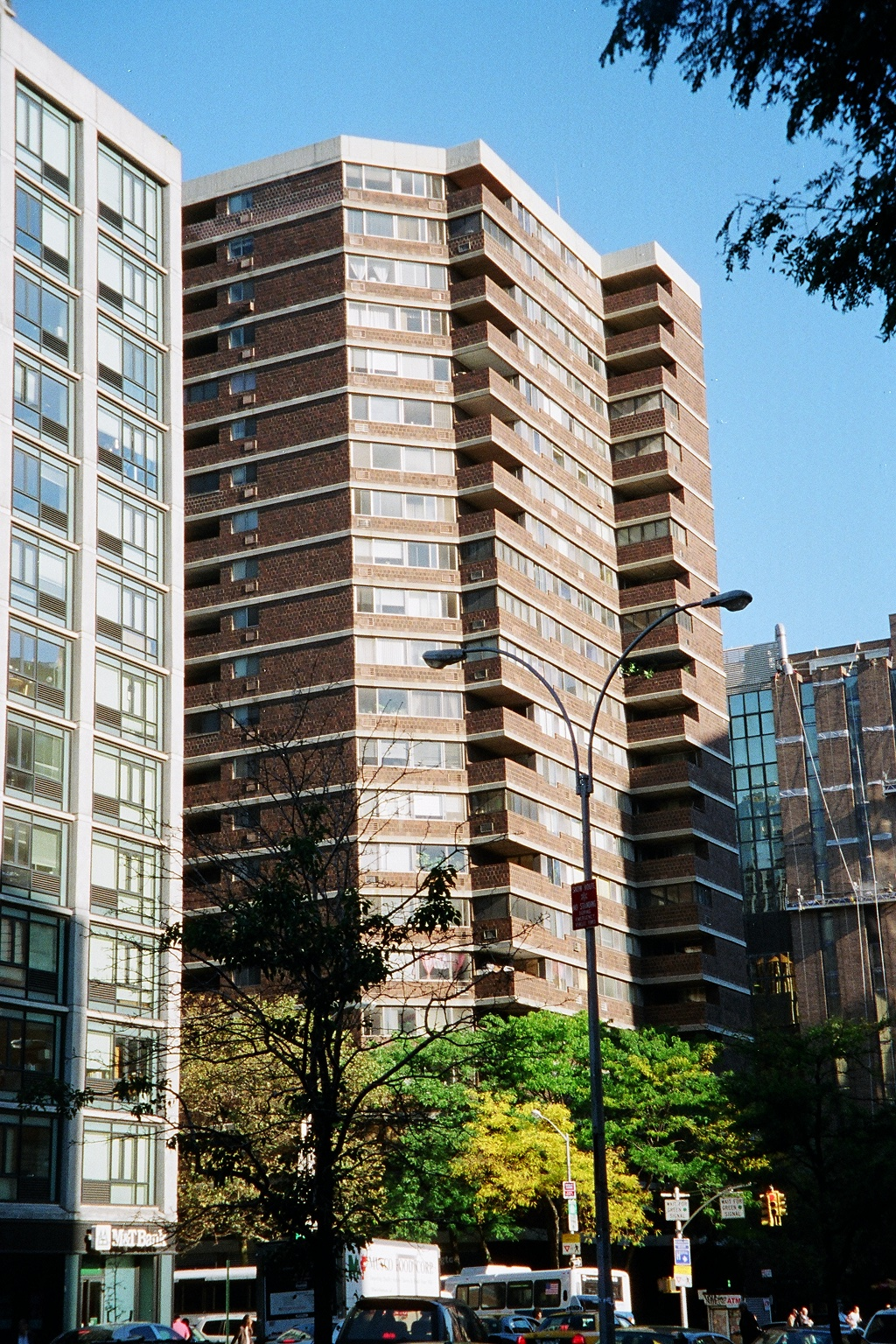
Looking north at the high-rise at 401 First Avenue in 2008

The first phase of East Midtown Plaza, which contained 510 apartments, opened in 1972. The second phase of the project was completed in 1974 and added 236 units to the housing complex.

In 1988, an article in New York Newsday reported that the Coalition for the Homeless found that 15 percent of the apartments at East Midtown Plaza were occupied by residents that had incomes at or exceeding the maximum income level allowed to be eligible to reside in a Mitchell-Lama program. These residents included New York Supreme Court justices Herbert Altman and his wife Myriam, whose combined annual salary of $190,000 exceeded the maximum allowable income of $50,304 for their apartment. At the time, an eviction rule required tenants earning more than 150 percent of the allowable income for their apartment to be removed, but it had never been enforced by the city's Department of Housing and Preservation (HPD) or the state's Division of Housing and Community Renewal.

Beginning in 1999, the East End Temple occupied temporary space in East Midtown Plaza while it searched for a new home. The congregation leased the site of a former restaurant at 403 First Avenue, converting the space into a sanctuary with classrooms and offices. The synagogue had been previously located at 300 East 23rd Street, across the street from East Midtown Plaza, since 1957. The congregation later moved to a property it had purchased and renovated at 245 East 17th Street in Stuyvesant Square.

=== Privatization debate ===
Beginning around the turn of the century, a group of residents attempted to privatize the six-building, 746-unit housing complex. As the Mitchell-Lama program set limits on sale prices, privatizing the building would have enabled residents to sell their units at a greater profit. They also argued that an increased flip tax would earn income for the complex, which was needed for repairs. Opponents countered that privatization would increase monthly maintenance charges, making units unaffordable for some residents. Residents of the co-op voted on the matter in 2009 and litigation ensued after both groups (which were known as the "privateers" and the "antis") claimed victory. In 2012, the New York Court of Appeals upheld the decision of lower courts to prevent the complex from becoming private, ruling that the vote had been won by the anti-privatization group, because the co-op's certificate of incorporation specified that each shareholder had one vote at meetings (the pro-privatization group had claimed victory with votes counted on a per-share basis, which varied based on the size of their unit). The court also ruled that two-thirds of the shareholders would have needed to vote in favor of the privatization in order for the building complex to leave the Mitchell-Lama program.

Another effort to privatize the complex was launched by a group of residents in 2016. Since then, the co-op's board has kept open its option to privatize, and elected to refinance its mortgage to one that does not include a prepayment penalty in lieu of a package of incentives offered by HPD that were designed to keep the housing complex in the Mitchell-Lama program.

In addition to having limits on the total income of persons in a household, housing complexes in the Mitchell-Lama program also have requirements for occupancy in that three-bedroom apartments can have no fewer than five persons and four-bedroom apartments can have no fewer than six persons. In 2012, a member of the co-op's board was sued by another resident who alleged that their family cut the waitlist for a four-bedroom apartment because their household did not meet the city's household requirements.

The 1.25-acre (0.51 ha) public plaza at the center of the complex was renovated beginning in 2015, replacing the amphitheater with a new playground and landscaping, and rehabilitating the underlying infrastructure, including the drainage, electrical and lighting systems. The reconfiguration of the public space was designed by WXY Studio.

== Architecture ==
East Midtown Plaza Site Plan
1 319 East 24th Street (high-rise)
2 400 Second Avenue (high-rise)
3 401 First Avenue (high-rise)
4 311 East 23rd Street (low-rise)
5 333 East 23rd Street (low-rise)
6 320 East 25th Street (low-rise)
7 Public Plaza
8 St. Sebastian Church (demolished)

The complex includes six apartment buildings—three high-rises and three low-rises. The high-rises at 319 East 24th Street, 400 Second Avenue, and 401 First Avenue contain a total of 28, 27, and 22 floors, respectively. The low-rises at 311 East 23rd Street, 333 East 23rd Street, and 320 East 25th Street are 9- and 11-story buildings and mostly consist of duplex apartments.

The buildings were joined by a public plaza, which originally included an amphitheater and a fountain and was bordered on one side by a playground and on the other side by a landscaped area with seating. Part of the public plaza sits above the complex's underground parking garage. In addition to the publicly accessible playground at street level, three private playgrounds were provided on the second-floor terraces, with access restricted through the buildings. Small triangular plazas are located at the corners of the towers at the intersections of East 23rd Street with First and Second avenues. A depressed plaza is located at the southeast corner of Second Avenue and East 24th Street.

Along the north side of East 23rd Street, high-rise towers anchor each end of the site at First and Second Avenues and the low-rise structures running between them provide a continuous street wall, scaled to the interior plaza on East 24th Street, with the only interruption being an entrance to the plaza near the middle of the block. The provision of ground floor retail along this corridor preserved the commercial character of East 23rd Street. The north side of the plaza contains a single tower and an adjoining low-rise building that also provides a street wall along the south side of East 25th Street.

Similar to Davis, Brody & Associates' Riverbend project, the facade of the buildings uses large bricks (some being 8 by 8 inches (20 cm × 20 cm) in size), which reduced masonry costs and also helped in humanizing the scale of the buildings. The mass of the buildings is also broken down by balconies, which repeat on every other floor of the low-rises with duplex apartments to create a sculptural pattern, and employ brick parapet walls instead of glass or metal railings. The facade also includes exposed concrete floor slabs, which divides the brickwork on each floor, and metal panels between windows to create another horizontal band using a different material. The towers contain angled corners, softening their appearance from the exterior and providing interior living rooms in corner apartments with longer views down streets or across intersections, and variations in their floorplates prevent repetition with the other high-rises at the complex.

East Midtown Plaza was carefully designed to take into account the presence of St. Sebastian Church on East 24th Street—from the scaling of the new buildings to the selection of brick colors for their facades—and made the existing church building a focal point of the new midblock plaza. Ironically, the parish was closed by the Archdiocese of New York in March 1971, before the first phase of East Midtown Plaza was even completed. St. Sebastian Church was demolished and the property was sold to a private developer that constructed an apartment building on the site.

== Impact ==
=== Reception ===
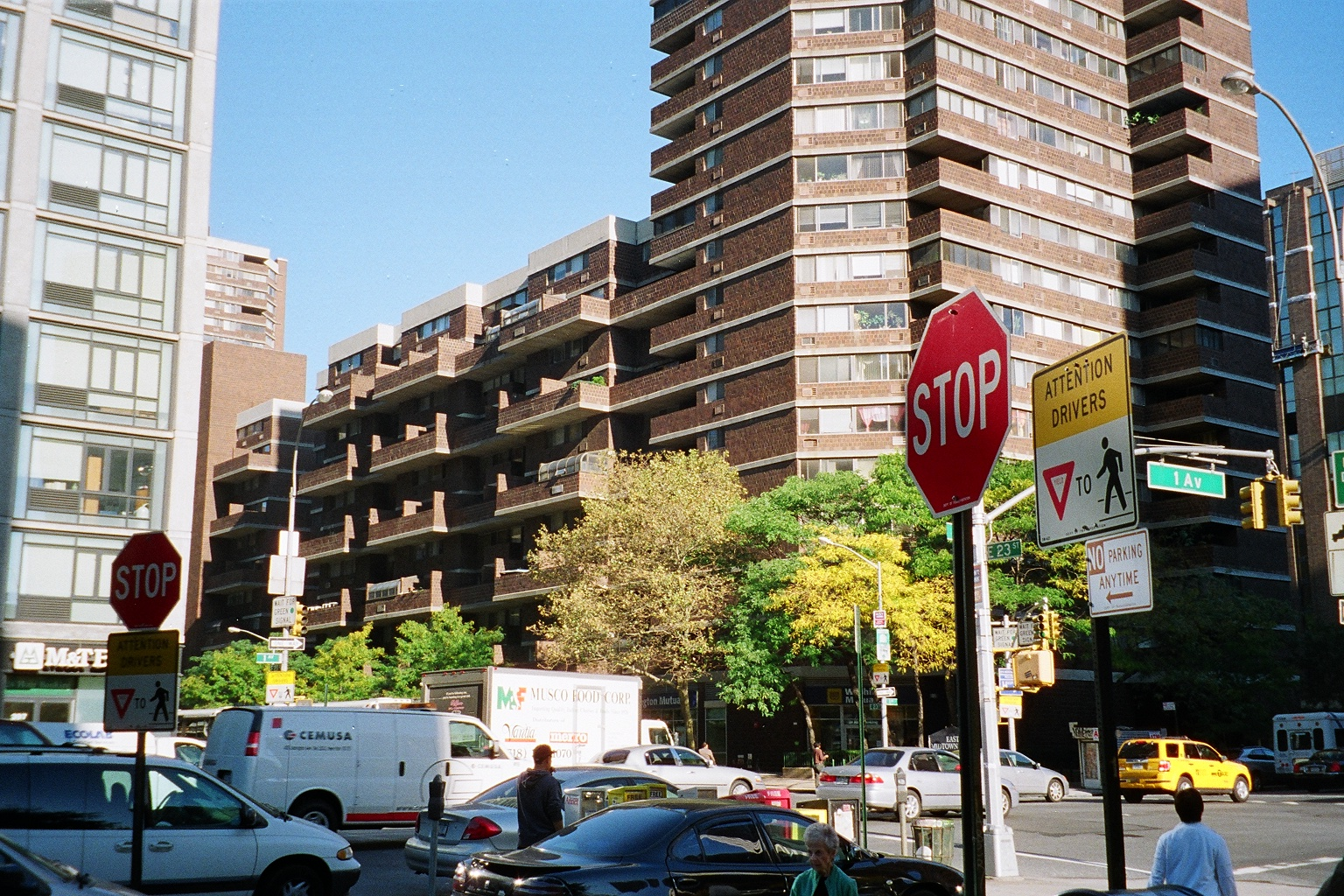
View of high-rise at First Avenue and low-rises along East 23rd Street in 2008

In his 1979 book The City Observed, author Paul Goldberger described East Midtown Plaza as being "assertive, yet welcoming" and noted that "these brick towers feel like houses, not like institutions, for all their size". The AIA Guide to New York City commended the design of the housing complex as "urbane street architecture", calling it "an ode to brick, cut, carved, notched, and molded" and "powerful, with great style, rather than stylish". Robert A. M. Stern and the co-authors of his 1995 book New York 1960 noted that "the buildings of East Midtown Plaza had considerable sculptural presence, yet their overall massing never got out of hand and was never disrespectful to the street wall."

=== Awards and honors ===
East Midtown Plaza received a certificate of merit from the Municipal Art Society in 1972. The following year, the project was one of six projects recognized by the City Club of New York with the Albert S. Bard Award. It also received an honorable mention from the New York Association of Architects in 1973.

=== Design influence ===
Some of the design elements from East Midtown Plaza were incorporated into Phipps Plaza West, a housing complex completed in 1976 and located only one block away on the east side of Second Avenue between East 26th and 29th streets. The development of Phipps Plaza West was led by Lynda Simmons. Before joining Phipps Houses (the project's sponsor), Simmons had worked as an architect at Davis, Brody & Associates and was the project director for East Midtown Plaza. Simmons was able to incorporate many of her design philosophies at Phipps Plaza West and worked with the project's architects to incorporate her ideas into the design.
