= St. Sebastian Church (New York City) =

Demolished church in Manhattan, New York

Coordinates: 40.738068°N 73.979691°W

The Church of St. Sebastian
- Interactive map of the The Church of St. Sebastian area

General information
- Location: Manhattan, New York, United States
- Closed: March 31, 1971
- Client: Roman Catholic Archdiocese of New York

The Church of St. Sebastian is a former Roman Catholic parish church under the authority of the Roman Catholic Archdiocese of New York, located at 312 East 24th Street in the Kips Bay neighborhood of Manhattan in New York City, United States.

The parish was established in 1915 by Italian immigrants who faced discrimination at Church of the Epiphany, which was located two blocks away on Second Avenue at the corner of East 22nd Street. Masses were originally held in the basement of Church of the Epiphany and in a rented hall at First Avenue and East 23rd Street. Plans for construction of the new church were completed and filed by architect Nicholas Serracino in August 1916; these called for a Gothic style church built out of brick with a seating capacity of 650. The building had a frontage of 48 feet (15 m) and a depth of 98.9 feet (30.1 m). The parish was staffed by Franciscan Friars beginning in 1917.

In 1924, St. Sebastian's purchased three four-story buildings at 319–323 East 23rd Street that were located behind the church. Two years later, the church commissioned architects Salvati & Le Quornik to prepare plans for a four-story rectory and parish hall.

The Bellevue South Urban Renewal Area, which encompassed the area between First and Second avenues from East 23rd to 30th streets, was approved by the New York City Planning Commission and New York City Board of Estimate in 1964. The Church of St. Sebastian was spared from demolition by the urban renewal project and the master plan for the new development that would surround the site of the church—East Midtown Plaza—was specifically designed by Davis, Brody & Associates to take the design of St. Sebastian's into account, including the selection of brick colors for the adjacent buildings and making the church a focal point of the new midblock plaza formed by the addition of two cul-de-sacs on East 24th Street.

In February 1971, Terence Cardinal Cooke announced that the archdiocese would close the parish on March 31, 1971, because it was weakening the nearby parishes of Church of the Epiphany, Church of Our Lady of the Scapular of Mount Carmel and Church of St. Stephen the Martyr. Parishioners of St. Sebastian unsuccessfully fought to prevent the closure of their parish. The church was demolished and the property was sold to a private developer, who erected a six-story apartment building on the site that was completed in 1974.

== See also ==
- List of churches in the Roman Catholic Archdiocese of New York
