= Bernecker =

Bernecker is a toponymic surname of German origin, derived from any of numerous places in the regions of Franconia or Württemberg named Berneck. Notable people with the surname include:

- John Bernecker (1984–2017), American stunt performer
- Louis Frederick Bernecker (1876–1937), American artist

== See also ==
- Berneck (disambiguation)
