= Church of the Sacred Heart (Bronx) =

Church in New York City

Coordinates: 40°50′19.5″N 73°55′24″W

The Church of the Sacred Heart
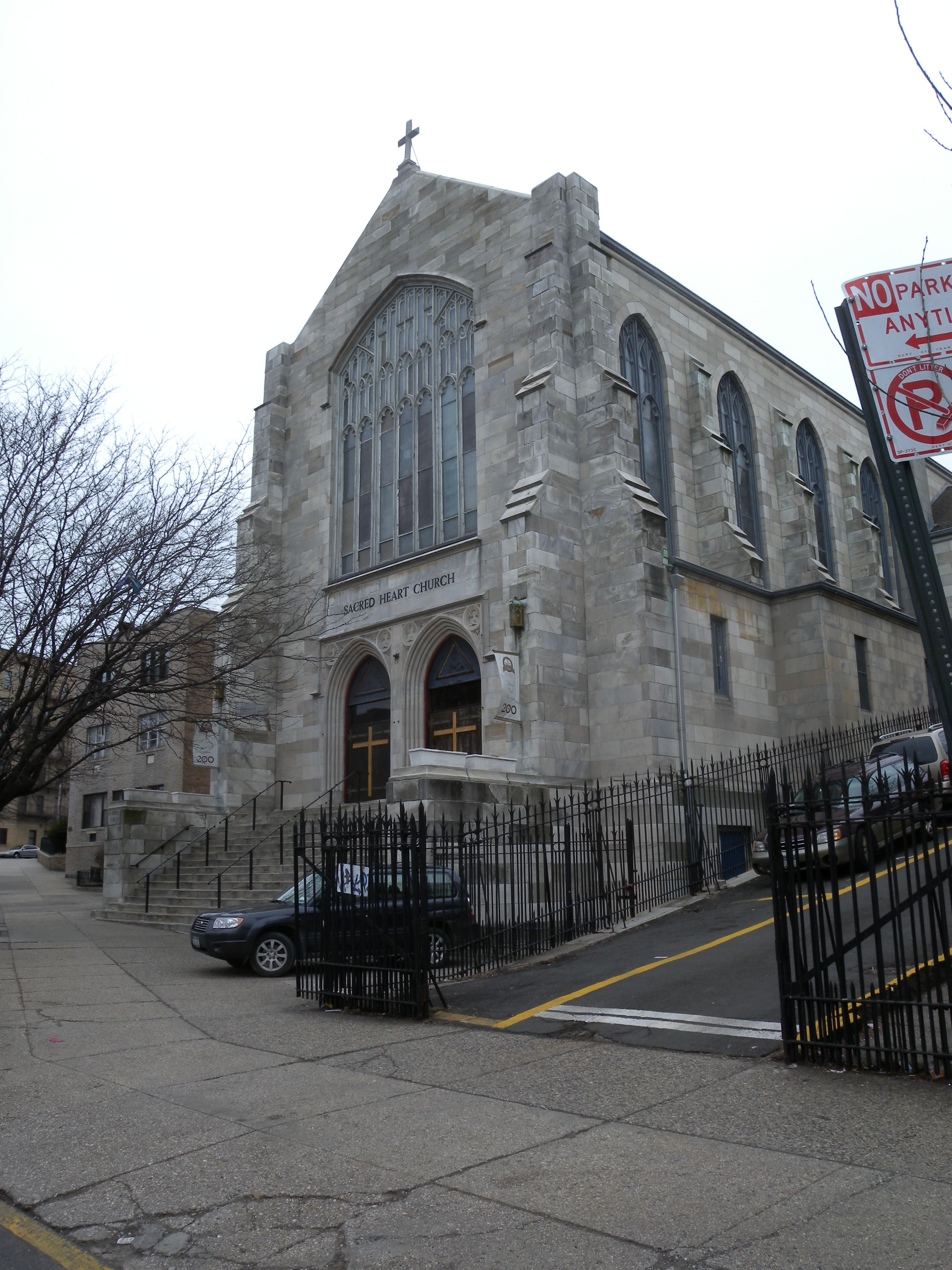
- Interactive map of the The Church of the Sacred Heart area

General information
- Location: New York, New York, United States of America
- Construction started: 1910
- Completed: 1910
- Client: Roman Catholic Archdiocese of New York

Technical details
- Structural system: Masonry brick

Design and construction
- Architect: Elliott Lynch

The Church of the Sacred Heart is a Roman Catholic parish church in the Roman Catholic Archdiocese of New York, located at 1253 Shakespeare Avenue (West 168 Street), Bronx, New York City 10452. The church building was designed by architect Elliott Lynch, who designed several other Catholic churches and parish schools. The church is connected with a school of the same name.

== History ==
In 1875, Rev. James A, Mullen, assistant at St. Augustine's Church was tasked with organizing the Sacred Heart parish at Highbridge from territory originally included in St. Augustine's. Upon learning that St. Rose of Lima parish on Cannon Street in lower Manhattan was building a new church, he asked for and was given the old one. The small frame building was cut into sections, transported to the Bronx and reassembled to serve as a temporary church. Sacred Heart remained primarily a rural parish and Father Mullen remained pastor until his death on December 21, 1907.

The New York Times reported in 1910: "New Bronx Church: Plans were filed for a new brick church and rectory to replace the present frame edifices of the Sacred Heart Roman Catholic Church, in Shakespeare Avenue, between 168th and 169th Streets. The church is to occupy a plot 75 by '280, and the rectory 25 by 280, the total cost being placed at $590,000 by the architect, Elliott Lynch." The cornerstone was laid in 1910 and the church completed in April 1912.

A stained glass window commemorates the seven parishioners killed during World War I.
