= Edward McGlynn =

American Catholic priest and social reformer (1837–1900)

The Reverend Edward McGlynn
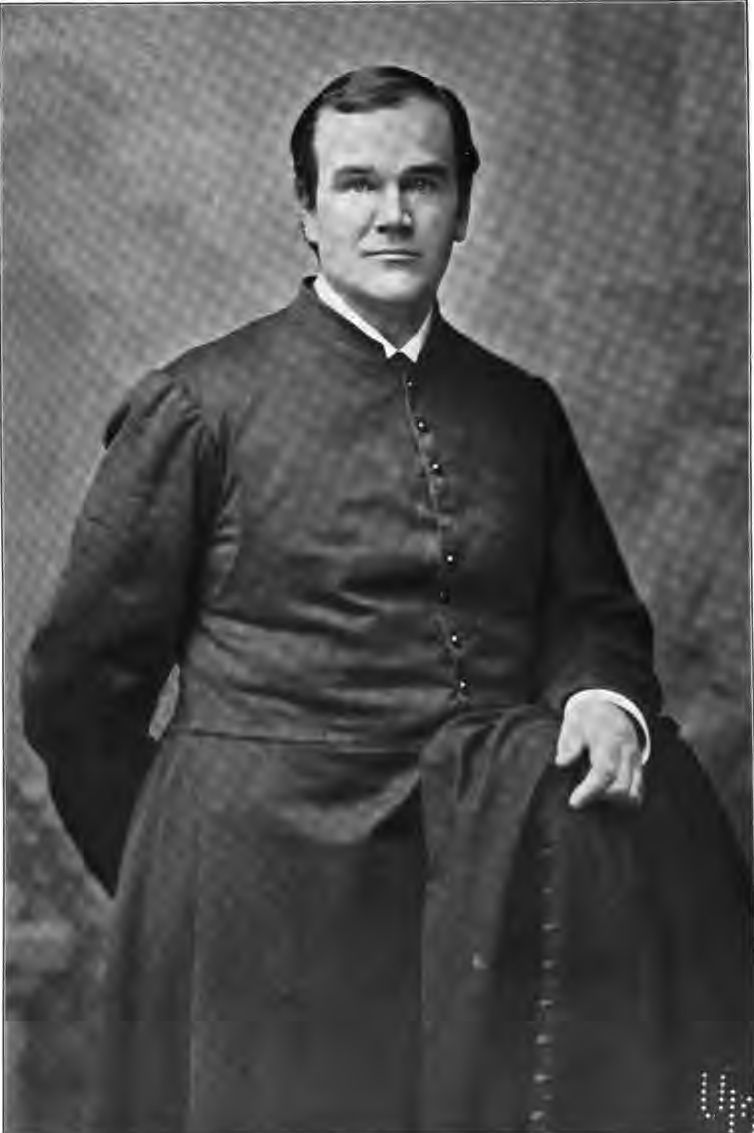
- McGlynn about 1870 as pastor of St. Stephen's
- Born: September 27, 1837; New York City, New York, U.S.
- Died: January 7, 1900 (aged 62); Newburgh, New York, U.S.
- Resting place: Calvary Cemetery; Queens, New York, U.S.

Edward McGlynn (September 27, 1837 – January 7, 1900) was an American Catholic priest and social reformer who was controversial in Catholic circles for his acceptance of public schools. He actively promoted the political goals of Henry George and the single-tax movement and campaigned for George when he ran for mayor in 1886. McGlynn was censured and excommunicated from 1887 until 1892 on charges of disobedience and the suspicion of socialism.

== Family and early life ==
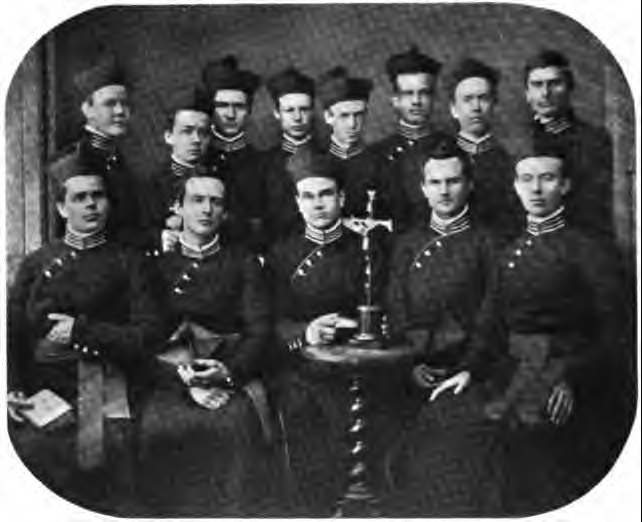
McGlynn as a student in Rome, 1859, front row, third from left.

Edward McGlynn was born in New York City on September 27, 1837. His parents, Peter and Sarah McGlynn, had emigrated from Donegal, Ireland in 1824. His father became a contractor, acquiring a small fortune before dying in 1847, leaving a widow and ten children. McGlynn was first educated at the Thirteenth Street Grammar School and the Free Academy, now the City College of New York. When McGlynn was thirteen years of age, Archbishop Hughes, a family friend, and his pastor, Father Jeremiah Williams Cummings, arranged for him to attend the Urban College of the Propaganda in Rome. In 1859, after eight years in Rome, he transferred to the newly opened Pontifical North American College. He had received his doctorate in theology and philosophy, and was ordained a priest on March 24, 1860, in the Church of St. John Lateran.

== Priesthood ==
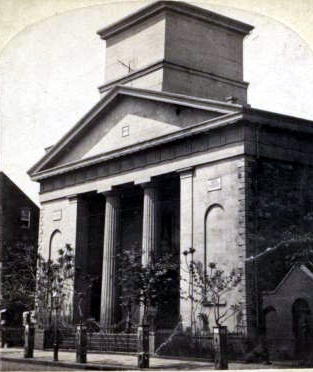
St. Joseph's Church in the Village. N. Washington Place, N.Y. ( ca. 1860 )

McGlynn's first assignment was as assistant to Rev. Thomas Farrell at St. Joseph's Church, New York. Father Farrell had been an ardent opponent of slavery and left $5,000 in his will for a Catholic church for blacks. This led to the establishment in 1883 of St. Benedict the Moor Parish in Hell's Kitchen. Father McGlynn next became acting pastor of St. Brigid's on Avenue B., and then St. James' in lower Manhattan. He next served at St. Ann's Church, Eighth Street. He was appointed chaplain of St. Joseph's Military Hospital at McGowan's Pass on the former grounds of Mount St. Vincent's Academy in Central Park, and retained this position until after the end of the Civil War in 1865.

In 1865, McGlynn's former pastor, Rev. Cummings, asked Archbishop Hughes to appoint McGlynn as his assistant. At the death of Cummings, the following year, McGlynn became pastor, at the age of twenty-nine, of St. Stephen's Church on East Twenty-eighth Street, one of the largest parishes in New York, where he served as pastor until 1887. During this time, Constantino Brumidi, who painted The Apotheosis of Washington on the dome of the Capitol building in Washington, painted a fresco of the Crucifixion in St. Stephen's Church, for which he also executed a Martyrdom of St. Stephen and an Assumption of Mary. In 1870 he assisted the Sisters of Charity of New York in establishing St Stephen's Home for Children.

At over six feet tall and two hundred pounds, McGlynn was both an imposing figure and a compelling orator. McGlynn taught that "the highest form of charity is doing justice." After a time he began to feel that life was made a burden "by the never-ending procession of men, women and little children coming to my door begging, not so much for alms as employment." He wrote, "I began to ask myself, 'Is there no remedy? Is this God's order that the poor shall be constantly becoming poorer in all ou[r] large cities, the world over?'"

=== Controversy over parochial schools ===
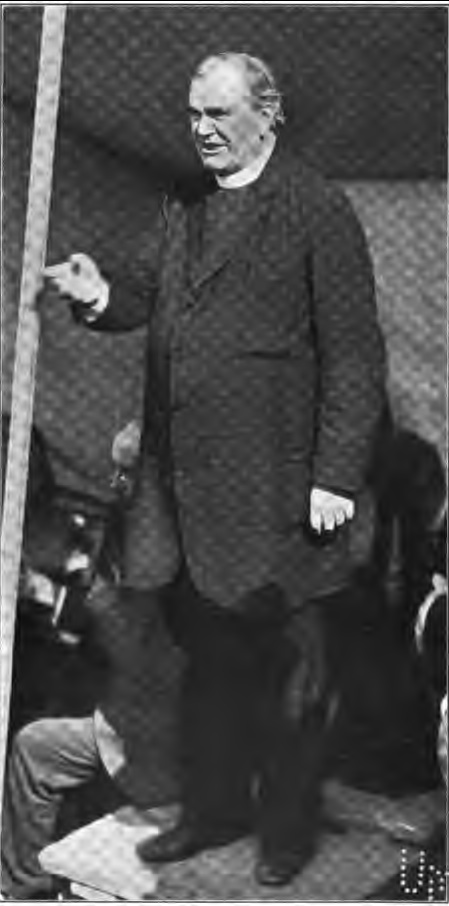
McGlynn in Green-Wood Cemetery, August 1898, speaking at the unveiling of a monument to Henry George.

McGlynn first drew national attention and came into conflict with his ecclesiastical superiors over his opposition to parish schools, as he claimed that public schools were good enough for all American children. He refused to build a parochial school in his parish, despite the fact that the Second Plenary Council of Baltimore, held in 1866, stated a school should be established in every parish. James McMaster's New York Freeman called McGlynn a liberal Catholic. He also drew criticism for his open friendship with Protestant clergymen, even giving an address once in Henry Ward Beecher's church, even though Beecher was outspoken against Catholicism.

=== Advocacy of single tax ===
McGlynn was deeply impressed by Henry George's Progress and Poverty. To conservatives, George's philosophy that the economic value derived from land, including natural resources should belong equally to all residents of a community, bordered on socialism. Archbishop Corrigan believed such reforms would violate an individual's right to private property. McGlynn met George in 1882 and took an active part in the 1886 failed campaign of Henry George for the office of Mayor of New York City.

==== Suspensions ====
About four years previously, Cardinal Simeoni, prefect of the Congregation of the Propagation of the Faith, had directed the authorities of the Archdiocese to compel McGlynn to retract his views on the land question as opposed to Catholic teaching. Cardinal McCloskey, at that time head of the Archdiocese, reprimanded McGlynn and required him to refrain from defending these views in public.

On September 29, 1886, Archbishop Corrigan forbade him to speak on behalf of Henry George's candidacy at a public meeting scheduled to take place on October 1 in Chickering Hall. McGlynn replied that to break this engagement would be imprudent, but promised to refrain from addressing any later meeting during the political campaign. The Archbishop immediately suspended him from the exercise of his priestly functions for a period of two weeks. McGlynn went ahead with the address, and later on election day, made the rounds of the polls with Henry George and Terence V. Powderly, of the Knights of Labor. On November 27, 1886, Archbishop Corrigan issued a pastoral letter, published in the New York Freemen's Journal, condemning theories that would violate an individual's right to private property. McGlynn publicly criticized the letter. Toward the end of November, a second temporary suspension was imposed.

McGlynn's association with the Knights of Labor proved problematic. The Second Plenary Council of Baltimore had condemned secret societies. The Knights of Labor use of secrecy to help prevent employers from firing members, nevertheless, concerned a number of bishops. At the Third Plenary session in 1884, the members decided that the archbishops should determine whether a group fell under censure, and if they could not agree, the subject be referred to Rome. James Cardinal Gibbons, perhaps the most prominent American prelate at that time, was sympathetic to the labor. A copy of a letter Gibbons sent to the Propaganda in February 1887 opposing condemnation of the Knights of Labor wound up published the following month in the New York Herald. This increased the tension between Gibbons and Corrigan, although the influential Cardinal Manning of Westminster expressed support for Gibbons's views.

==== Removal from pastorate and excommunication ====
In December 1886, McGlynn was called to Rome by the Propaganda, which was reviewing George's theories. McGlynn declined unless the suspension was first lifted and, on January 14, Archbishop Corrigan removed McGlynn from the pastorate of St. Stephen's for insubordination. In February, Cardinal Gibbons, who was concerned about maintaining episcopal authority and happened to be in Rome, sent word to McGlynn's canonical advocate, the Rev. Dr. Richard Lalor Burtsell, that McGlynn ought to go to Rome as soon as possible, and informed Archbishop Corrigan that he had done so. Once again a private correspondence of Gibbons ended up published and, much to his embarrassment, the American papers viewed him as sympathetic to McGlynn. When he saw the interpretation put on his actions, Gibbons decided to do nothing more.

Burtsell wrote a long letter to Cardinal Gibbons explaining fully the canonical situation from McGlynn's viewpoint, which Gibbons passed on to Denis J. O'Connell, Rector of the North American College in Rome. Late in May, Cardinal Simeoni advised McGlynn to come to Rome within forty days under penalty of excommunication. Holding that he had been guilty of no stubborn resistance and unaware that the reply made on his behalf by Burtsell had never reached the Pope, McGlynn, claiming ill health, refused to obey the order, and the excommunication became effective on July 4, 1887. The curia drew a distinction between ecclesiastical discipline and doctrinal error. A determination had not as yet been made on George's philosophy. For more than five years following this censure he defended the Single-Tax doctrine at the Sunday afternoon meetings of the Anti-Poverty Society, which he had founded with George in March 1887 and of which he was the first president; he also made a tour of the West and virtually declared himself an unbeliever in the supremacy of the Pope. He lived at the home of his widowed sister in Brooklyn.

==== Lifting of excommunication ====
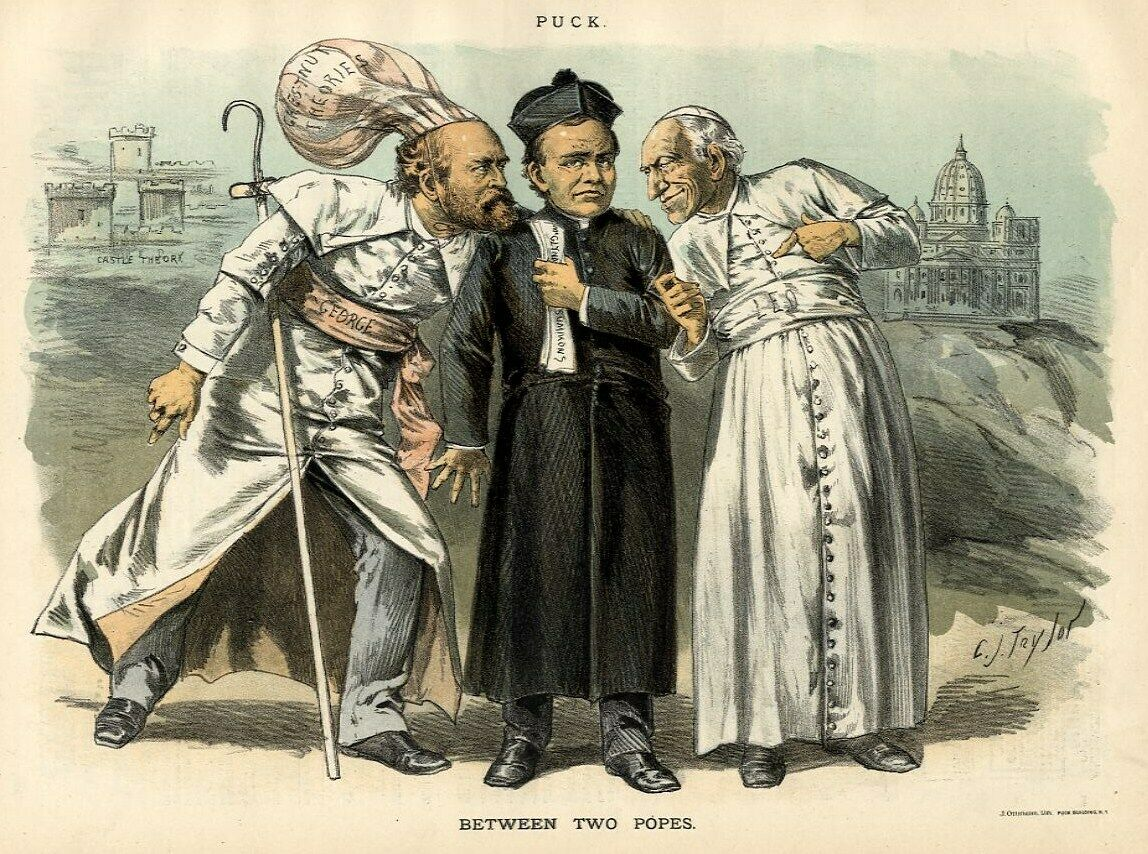
"Between Two Popes", Puck cartoon satirizing the controversies

In 1892, Pope Leo XIII sent Archbishop Francesco Satolli to the United States as papal legate with instructions to review the McGlynn case. An examination was held at the Catholic University; McGlynn had authorized Burtsell to promise that he would no longer promulgate doctrines unauthorized by the Church. This, combined with the assurance of four professors at the university that McGlynn's single tax views were not contrary to Catholic teaching, led Satolli to lift the excommunication on December 23 and reinstate him in the ministry the next day. In 1892, on Christmas morning, McGlynn said Mass for the first time since his excommunication in 1887, celebrating three liturgies in Brooklyn. That evening he spoke at Cooper Union before an immense and enthusiastic gathering, not uttering a word of regret for his actions, instead declaring that he intended to continue advocating Single-Tax doctrines; he then delivered a traditional Christmas sermon.

The following June, McGlynn visited Rome and was cordially received in private audience by the Pope. In his description of this event shortly afterwards, McGlynn reported that the Pope had said to him, "But surely you admit the right of property," and that he had answered in the affirmative as regards "the products of individual industry." Apparently, the Pope was satisfied with this answer. In the years following his restoration to his priestly functions he frequently spoke at single tax meetings and made it quite clear that he had not been required by the Pope to retract his view on the land question.

A passage in the Pope's 1891 encyclical, Rerum novarum, reads: "The right to possess private property is derived from nature, not from man; and the State has the right to control its use in the interests of the public good alone, but by no means to absorb it altogether. The State would therefore be unjust and cruel if under the name of taxation it were to deprive the private owner of more than is fair." The implication of McGlynn's reinstatement is that if the single tax could be shown to be fair, it would not be a contravention of the Church's ethical teachings. McGlynn remained a friend of Henry George, delivering his eulogy in 1897.

Robert Emmett Curran, in Shaping American Catholicism: Maryland and New York, 1805-1915, argues that McGlynn's opponents went to Rome for help in suppressing him, giving the Vatican an opening to crack down on the growing independence of the American Church. Historians generally agree that Corrigan's handling of the McGlynn matter probably cost him a cardinalate.

In 1894, McGlynn, to his parishioners' regret, was assigned as pastor of St. Mary's in Newburgh, New York. He celebrated his first Mass there on January 1, 1895.

== Death ==
After a six-week illness that reduced his robust physique to an emaciated appearance, he died primarily of Bright's disease in his Newburgh church rectory on January 7, 1900. His last audible words were, "Jesus, have mercy on me." Prayers had been offered in Catholic and Protestant churches for his recovery.

McGlynn's funeral at St. Mary's, which occasioned widespread expressions of sorrow and appreciation by members of both communities, was held at Newburgh on January 10 and was attended by a packed crowd, about a hundred Catholic priests, and all the city's Protestant clergymen, there by special invitation. His close friend of half a century, Rev. Dr. Burtsell, delivered the eulogy.

That night, some 30,000 people filed by McGlynn's coffin in his old parish of St. Stephen's. A second, similarly packed funeral was held there the next day, after which he was buried in Calvary Cemetery in Queens. A review of his personal affairs found that he was at least $10,000 in debt due to his charitable activities.

== Burial and memorial ==
Though McGlynn is actually buried in Calvary Cemetery, Queens (then the Archdiocese of New York's principal cemetery), a life-sized bronze statue of him stands in the non-denominational Woodlawn Cemetery in the Bronx. Supporters paid for the creation of the monument, but the archdiocese had refused to allow it to be placed on his grave, so they instead bought land in Woodlawn to erect it.

== See also ==
- Thomas J. Hagerty
