= Henry Gordon Thunder Sr. =

Henry Gordon Thunder Sr. (10 February 1832, Tipperary - 15 December 1881, Philadelphia) was an Irish-born American organist, pianist, conductor, composer, music arranger, and music educator. Raised and educated in Dublin, he immigrated to the United States and began his career in the late 1840s as an organist in Baltimore, Maryland. He spent most of his career working as the organist and choirmaster at St. Augustine Church in Philadelphia while simultaneously teaching at a music academy he founded in that city. He also held organist posts at Saint Clement's Church, Philadelphia and the Church of St. Stephen the Martyr in Manhattan. At the time of his death The New York Times stated that "[Thunder] arranged and composed a great deal of music for the Catholic Church service, and stood in the front ranks of the organists and pianists in this country." He should not be confused with his son, the organist, composer, and conductor Henry Gordon Thunder, Jr. (1865-1958).

== Life and career ==
Born in Ireland in 1832, Thunder grew up in the city of Dublin, and received his musical training in that city. His uncle was Henry St John, 5th Viscount Bolingbroke. He immigrated to the United States where he settled in Baltimore, Maryland. He began his career as an organist in that city after being supported in that endeavor by Irish-born priest Patrick E. Moriarty to whom he was related. A third generation musician, his son was also a prominent organist with the same name.

By at least 1852 and perhaps as early as 1849, Thunder succeeded B. Carr Cross as organist/choirmaster at St. Augustine Church in Philadelphia, Pennsylvania. He remained in that post until 1875. He then worked as organist at Saint Clement's Church, Philadelphia until 1877 when he took a position as organist at the Church of St. Stephen the Martyr in Manhattan. On September 30, 1877 he gave a recital of music by Mozart, Haydn, and Handel at St. Stephen.

In 1879 Thunder returned to the post of organist at St. Augustine Church in Philadelphia where he remained until his death in 1881 when his son succeeded him. During his tenure at St. Augustine Church, he organized the United States premieres of the Mass in A major op. 137 by Jan Kalivoda and the St. Cecilia Mass by Charles Gounod. He also oversaw the building of a new organ at St. Augustine Church, and composed or arranged a large amount of sacred music. He also authored a march, the "Villanova March", for Villanova University which was published in 1853.

Thunder spent one season as the conductor of the Handel and Haydn Society of Philadelphia, and for many years was the conductor of the Music Union choral society in that city. In addition to working as an organist and conductor, he was a prominent music educator in Philadelphia who established and operated a respected music academy in the city. He also worked as a music critic in Philadelphia. He was married to Elena Dos Santos, the daughter of Philadelphia organist A. F. Dos Santos. The couple had six children.

Thunder died on December 15, 1881 in Philadelphia. The cause was pneumonia.

== Partial list of compositions ==
- "No. 1 The Empire Hook & Ladder polka"
- "Villanova March" (1853)
- "Vacation Hymn", ballad by Moore inscribed to Miss Virginia De Ronceray
- "On to the battle", inscribed to the Pennsylvania Volunteers (1861), poetry by John E. McCaullay

== See also ==
- Music of Philadelphia
