= Church of Our Lady of the Scapular–St. Stephen =

Roman Catholic church in New York City

The Church of Our Lady of the Scapular–St. Stephen
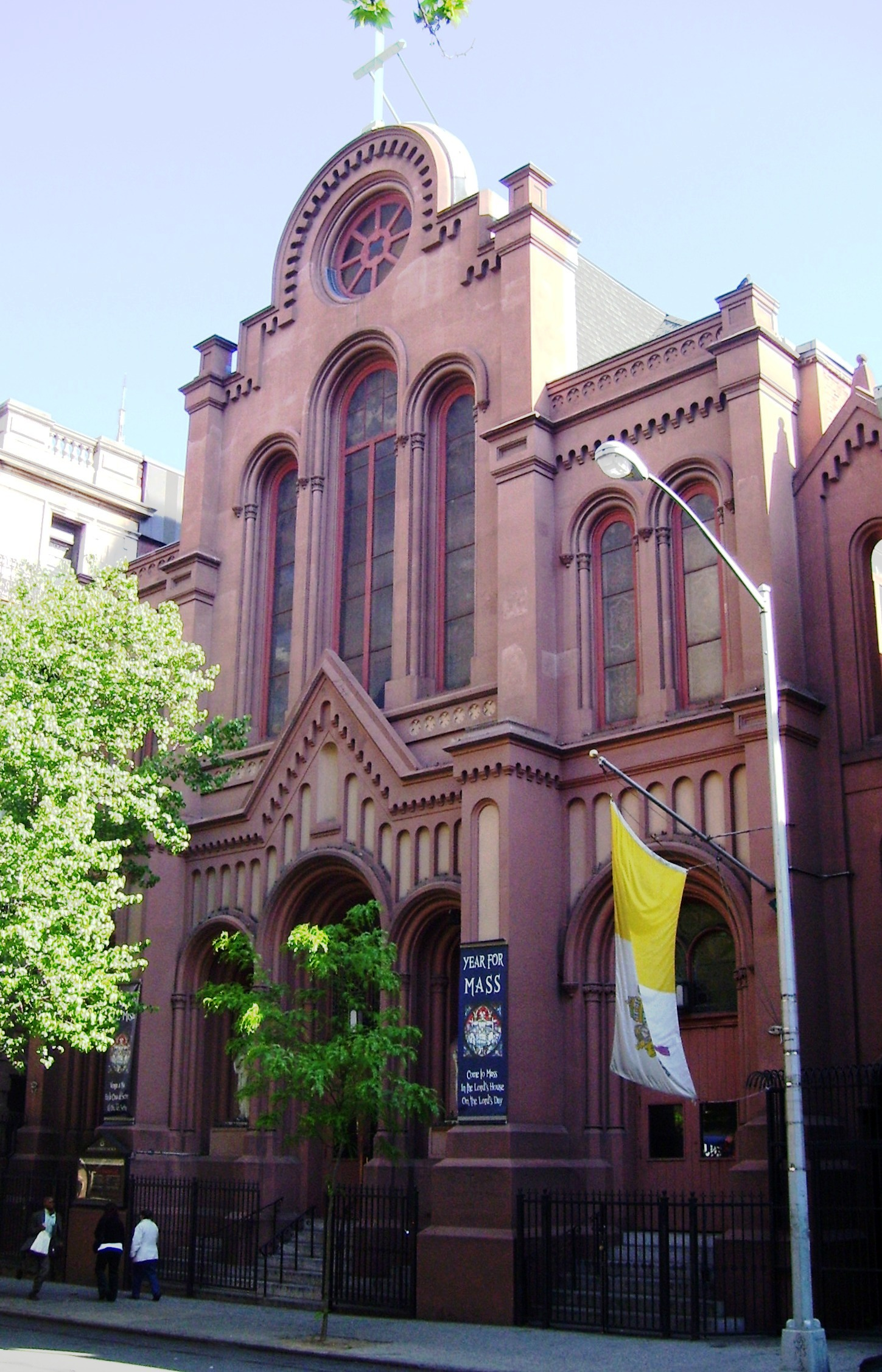
- (2011)

General information
- Architectural style: Romanesque Revival
- Location: Manhattan, New York City, U.S.
- Coordinates: 40°44′33″N 73°58′52.7″W
- Construction started: school: c.1897
- Completed: church: 1854 extension: 1865 school: c.1902 renovation: 1949 rectory: 1954
- Client: Roman Catholic Archdiocese of New York

Design and construction
- Architects: church: James Renwick Jr. extension: Patrick Charles Keely school: Elliott Lynch rectory: Knappe & Johnson

Website
- Our Lady of the Scapular–St. Stephen, Manhattan

New York City Landmark
- Designated: October 28, 2008
- Reference no.: 2259

The Church of Our Lady of the Scapular–St. Stephen is a Roman Catholic parish church in the Roman Catholic Archdiocese of New York, located at 149 East 28th Street between Third and Lexington Avenues in the Rose Hill neighborhood of Manhattan, New York City. It was established in the 1980s when the parish of the Church of Our Lady of the Scapular of Mount Carmel was merged into the parish of the Church of St. Stephen the Martyr. In January 2007, it was announced by the Archdiocese of New York that the Church of the Sacred Hearts of Mary and Jesus, located at 307 East 33rd Street, was to be merged into Our Lady of the Scapular–St. Stephen, then, in November 2014, the Archdiocese announced that the Church of Our Lady of the Scapular–St. Stephen was one of 31 neighborhood parishes which would be merged into other parishes. Our Lady of the Scapular–St. Stephen was to be merged into the Church of Our Saviour at 59 Park Avenue.

== St. Stephen the Martyr ==
The parish of St. Stephen the Martyr was formed in 1848 and was originally located on Madison Avenue. A temporary church was erected and dedicated by then Bishop John Hughes on December 23, 1849. In 1853 the property was purchased by the New York and Harlem Railroad and a new church was built on 28th Street and opened March 5, 1854. The first pastor was Rev. Jeremiah W. Cummings. One of the parishioners around that time was Orestes Brownson. In an article on "Vocations to the Priesthood" that the plain spoken Cummings contributed to "Brownson's Review" of October 1860, he severely criticized the management and mode of instruction in Catholic colleges and seminaries which he styled "cheap priest-factories". This aroused a bitter controversy, and brought out one of the noted essays by Archbishop Hughes, his "Reflections on the Catholic Press". "Under the administration of Dr. Cummings St. Stephen's, which he had completed in March, 1854, became the most fashionable and most frequented church in New York, its sermons and music making it a local attraction." During the 1860s St. Stephen's was one of the largest and most influential Catholic congregations in New York.

Cummings died in January 1866 after a long illness that incapacitated him for active service. He was succeeded by assistant pastor Rev. Edward McGlynn. Future Bishop of Buffalo, Charles H. Colton's first assignment after his ordination in 1876 was as a curate at Stephen's. He remained there for ten years, his duties including the chaplaincy at Bellevue. In 1879, Charles Edward McDonnell, (later Bishop of Brooklyn) was also curate at St. Stephen's. In 1877 Henry Gordon Thunder, Sr. was appointed organist and choirmaster at the church.

No less plain spoken than his predecessor, Rev. McGlynn was reprimanded by Archbishop John McCloskey, who required McGlynn to refrain from defending in public the views of Henry George, which some considered bordering on socialism. McGlynn subsequently ran afoul of Archbishop Michael Corrigan for McGlynn's open endorsement of George's mayoral campaign. In January 1877, Corrigan removed McGlynn from the pastorate of St. Stephen's for insubordination. Father Colton became pastor in February 1877 and founded the parish school. On June 10, 1903, Colton was appointed the fourth Bishop of Buffalo. He was succeeded by Thomas Francis Cusack, auxiliary bishop of New York, who served as pastor of St. Stephen's Church from 1904 to July 5, 1915, when he was named Bishop of Albany. At that time, the parish maintained the Presentation Day Nursery on East 32nd St., which allowed mothers to work; and St. Stephen's Inn at East 31st St., an affordable residence for young working women. Fr. Francis Cummings became pastor in 1919; he installed electric lighting in the church.

The Carmelites took over administration of the parish in 1988. In 1990, the parish of Our Lady of the Scapular merged with the parish of St. Stephen the Martyr.

=== Church of St. Stephen the Martyr ===
The parish's current church, the Romanesque Revival style, was designed by noted architect James Renwick Jr., who also designed St. Patrick's Cathedral and Grace Church. The façade has rounded arches for the entrance and windows. The building was extended north to 142 East 29th Street in 1865 by architect Patrick Charles Keely. The church includes forty-three interior murals by the artist Constantine Brumidi, who also provided murals in the U.S. Capitol, as well as a painting of the Crucifixion above the high altar. The stained glass windows are by Meyer of Munich.

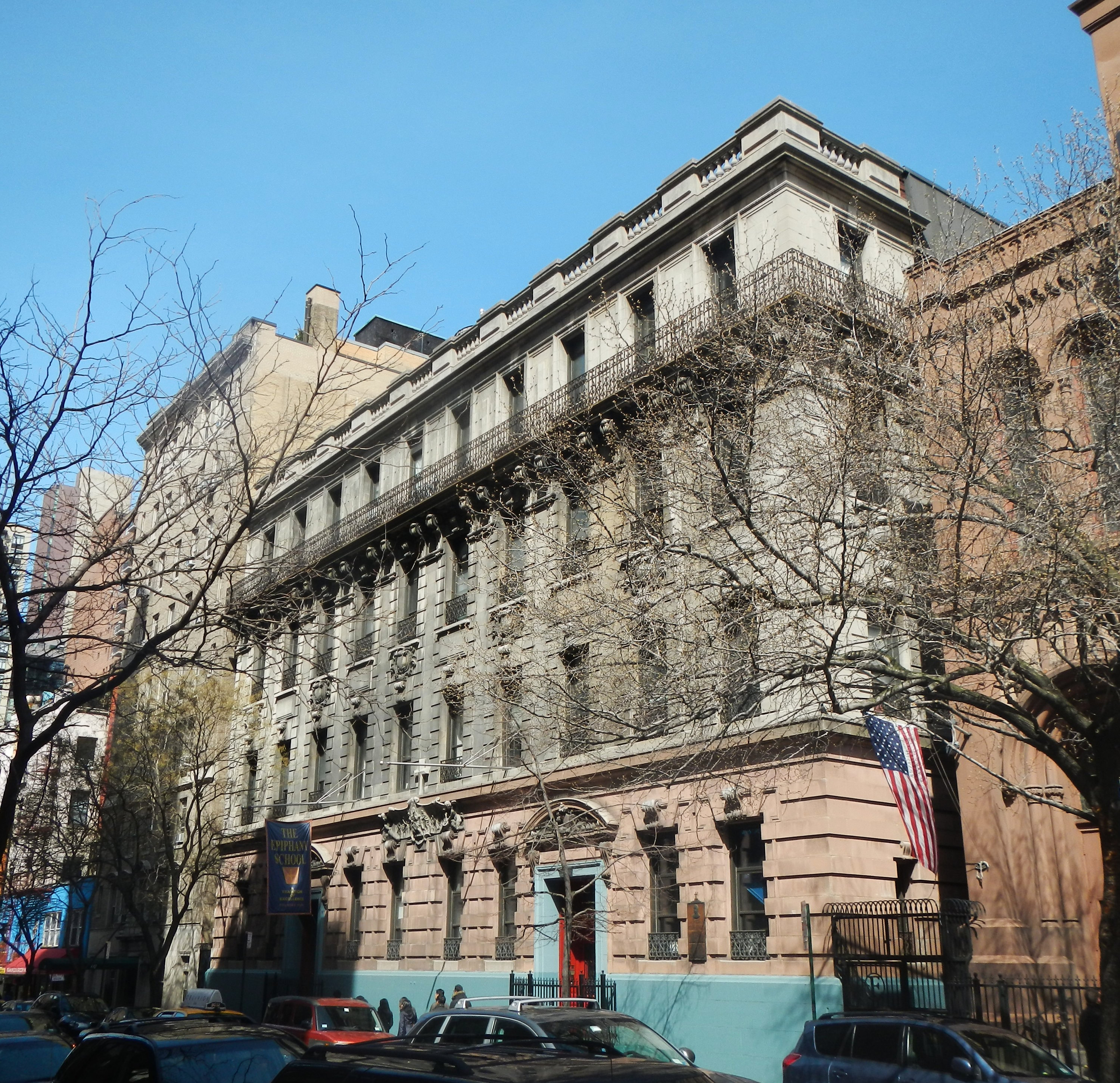
Epiphany School, 28th Street

On March 2, 1916, Spanish poets Juan Ramón Jiménez (Nobel Prize in Literature in 1956) and Zenobia Camprubí got married in this church. Their six-month stay in the United States is in the origin of Jiménez's book Diario de un poeta recién casado (1917), which was an inflection point for his poetry and for Spanish contemporary poetry.

The 29th Street facade is fully developed. The church underwent restoration in 1949. The connected school building on 28th Street was built c.1902, designed by Elliot Lynch, and a rectory was built on the 29th Street side in 1956, designed by the firm of Knappe & Johnson.

This church is not operational since its merging in 2014.

=== St. Stephen Parish School ===
The St. Stephen Parish School on 28th Street was built from 1897 to around 1902 to the designs of Elliot Lynch. The Sisters of Charity staffed the school until 1967.

It is now the St. Stephen's campus of the Epiphany School, one of their two facilities, the other being on East 22nd Street near the Epiphany Church.

== Our Lady of the Scapular ==
The parish of Our Lady of the Scapular of Mount Carmel was founded in 1889 by the Irish Carmelites.

== In popular culture ==
The church briefly appears in the 1989 television movie Kojak: Fatal Flaw.
