= Berneck =

Berneck may refer to:

- Berneck, St. Gallen, a municipality in the canton of St. Gallen, Switzerland
- Bad Berneck im Fichtelgebirge, a spa town in Bavaria, Germany
- Berneck (river), a river in Baden-Württemberg, Germany
- Berneck Castle, a castle near the village of Kauns, Austria
- Christopher Berneck (born 1992), German figure skater

== See also ==
- Bernecker, surname
