= St. Gregory the Great Church (Manhattan) =

Church in Manhattan, New York

Coordinates: 40°47′22.98″N 73°58′20.24″W

St. Gregory the Great Church and School
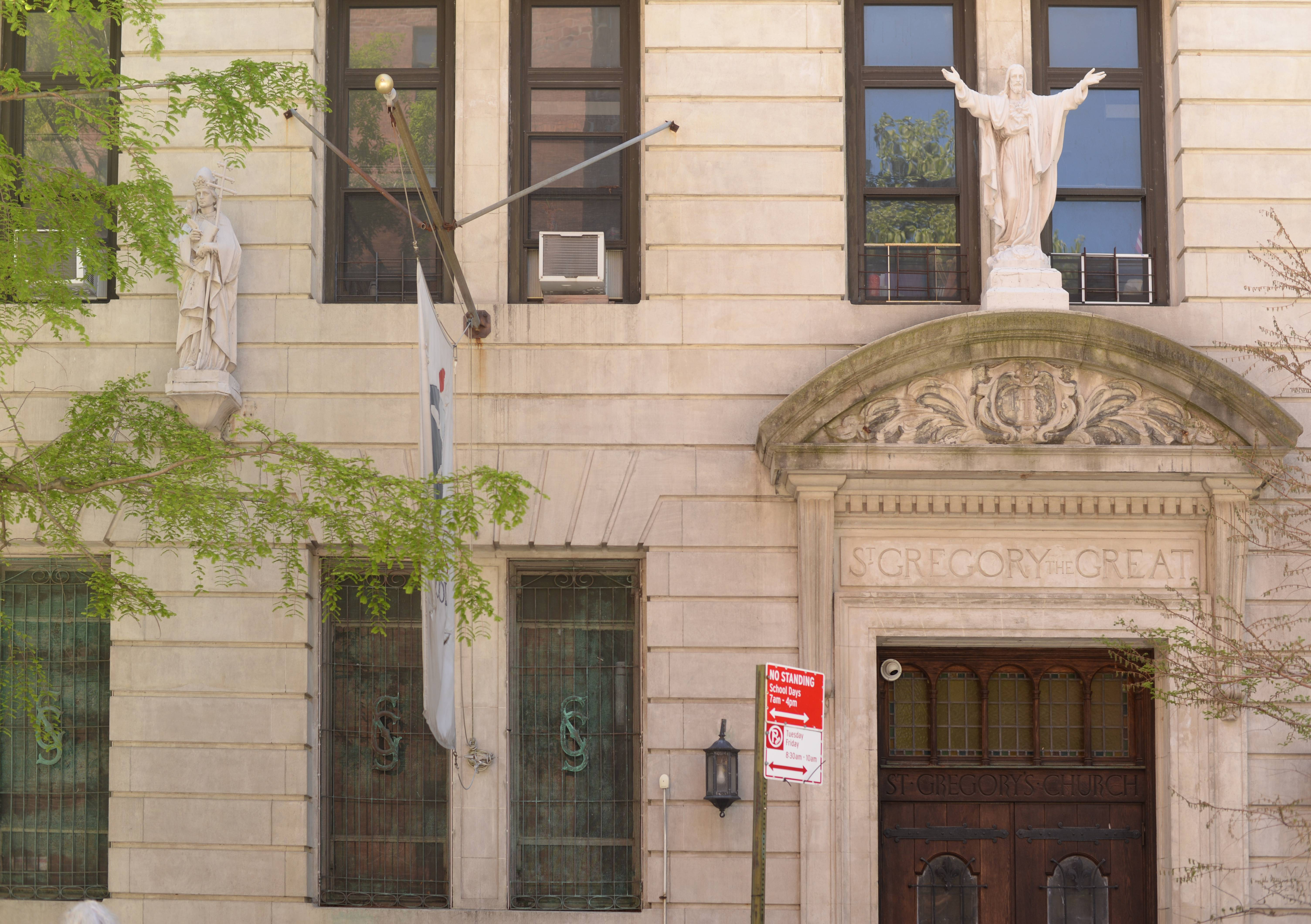
- Front view of the church
- Interactive map of the St. Gregory the Great Church and School area

General information
- Architectural style: Beaux-Arts architecture
- Location: New York, New York, United States of America
- Construction started: 1912
- Completed: 1913
- Cost: $120,000
- Client: Roman Catholic Archdiocese of New York

Technical details
- Structural system: Steel frame faced in red brick with granite dressings

Design and construction
- Architect: Elliott Lynch

Website
- St. Gregory the Great, Manhattan

The Church of St Gregory the Great is a Roman Catholic parish located on the Upper West Side of Manhattan, New York City. The parish is part of the Archdiocese of New York. The church building, designed by architect Elliott Lynch, contains the church and parish offices on the ground floor with St. Gregory the Great Parochial School on the next two floors above, the final fourth floor is occupied by the rectory. The address of the church is 144 West 90th Street, New York, New York 10024-1202; the address of the school is 138 West 90th Street, New York, NY 10024.

On May 8, 2015, the parish was merged with that of Holy Name of Jesus, and on June 30, 2017, the church was deconsecrated.

== History ==
The parish of St. Gregory the Great was planned in 1906 and established in 1907 by Cardinal Farley to serve the growing number of Catholics living on the Upper West Side between West 86th Street and West 93rd Street; first services took place in an old stable on 119 West 89th Street between Columbus and Amsterdam Avenues. By Christmas 1908, services were held on the site of the present church. The present church, built 1912/1913 for around $120,000, was designed by Elliott Lynch as a parochial school in a mid-block location on 90th Street. The school was dedicated by Cardinal Farley on October 19, 1913; although church accommodation in the ground floor was intended as temporary until a permanent church could be erected on the corner of Amsterdam Avenue and 90th Street. During World War I, 28 of 700 parishioner servicemen died. Plans for a separate church were abandoned and renovations to the structure began in 1918 and the unused fourth floor was converted into a rectory; also installed were an elevator, a sky-lit gallery and later a library and roof garden with fish pond. By the 1960s, nearly a third of the congregation was Hispanic.

During the two year pastorate of Father Henry J. Browne, the church increased as a center of activism on behalf of the working class and opposition to the Vietnam war. Bus trips to Washington, D.C., were organized so parishioners could attend peace vigils and anti-war protests. Fr. Browne championed affordable housing and battled a proposed Alexander's department store on Broadway. In April 1970, the anti-war Rev. Philip F. Berrigan, S.S.J., (1923–2002), wanted by the FBI for destroying draft files and failing to surrender for his prison term, arrived at St. Gregory's to address a peace rally. While Berrigan was staying at the rectory, located on the fourth floor of the church, the FBI broke down the church's door to arrest him. Fr. Browne left the same year to take up a teaching position at Rutgers University but in 1982, 90th Street in front of the St. Gregory's between Amsterdam and Columbus Avenues was dedicated as Henry Browne Boulevard.

== Pastors ==
- Father James Fitzsimmons, 1908-September 1918,
- Father William Hughes (also president of Cathedral College), 1918–1929
- Father Patrick O'Donnell, 1929–1945
- Father William Gill, 1945–1957
- Father Joseph Flanagan, 1957–1966
- Father Daniel Cronin, 1966–1968
- Father Henry J. Browne, 1968–1970
- Father Edward O'Donnell, 1970–1981
- Father John Lennon, 1981–1989
- Father Raymond Rafferty, 1989-June 1994
- Father Joseph Darbouze, 1994–2006
- Monsignor Michael Crimmins, 2006–present

== St. Gregory the Great Parish School ==
Sister Louise Mary Mattimore of the Sisters of Charity was the first principal. The Sisters of Charity would serve the school until 1943. That year they were replaced by the Presentation Sisters who ran the school until the late 1980s. The nuns resided on 88th Street between Columbus Avenue and Central Park West. The parish school still numbered slightly over 250 students in the 1950s. By the early 1990s, the school had been listed as one of 41 parochial schools in danger of closing. However, the Parish Council voted unanimously to keep it open.

== Description ==
The St. Gregory the Great building is a four-story structure, designed by Elliott Lynch as a parish school with the church occupying the ground floor. Externally, above the doors are statues of St. Gregory the Great and St. Sylvia. Plans for building a separate church nearby were abandoned during the interwar years and the spartan ornamentation of the school building's ground floor-turned church was gradually augmented with reused works from churches that had either closed or been remodeled. The charming temporary-turned-permanent appeal includes painted timber wainscoting, a number of mosaic portraits and some substantial stained glass windows. Groups of angels are clustered in the sanctuary and around the organ, although only one is signed by Louis F. Bernecker. Large canvas paintings of a parade of saints are affixed around the sanctuary, “painted in the late 1920s and 1930s (though none is dated or signed) by Father Gustave de Leon, a priest in the parish between 1921 and 1944…. The choice of saints seems to reflect three influences: the predominance of Irish, French and German ancestry among the parishioners; the interest in those recently canonized or beatified during the time this art work was done (approximately 1920-1945); the gratitude of the parish toward the Order of the Visitation and its affiliate, the Sisters of Charity, who staffed St. Gregory's School until 1943.”

== Social programs ==
St. Gregory's runs a soup kitchen with nearby Advent Lutheran in that church's basement.
