= Church of the Annunciation (New York City) =

Church in Manhattan, New York

Coordinates: 40°48′58.7″N 73°57′10.7″W

- Interactive map of the Church of the Annunciation area

General information
- Architectural style: Gothic-Renaissance
- Location: Manhattanville, Manhattan, New York City, New York, United States of America
- Construction started: 1906
- Completed: 1907
- Owner: The Roman Catholic Archdiocese of New York

Technical details
- Structural system: Limestone

Church of the Annunciation
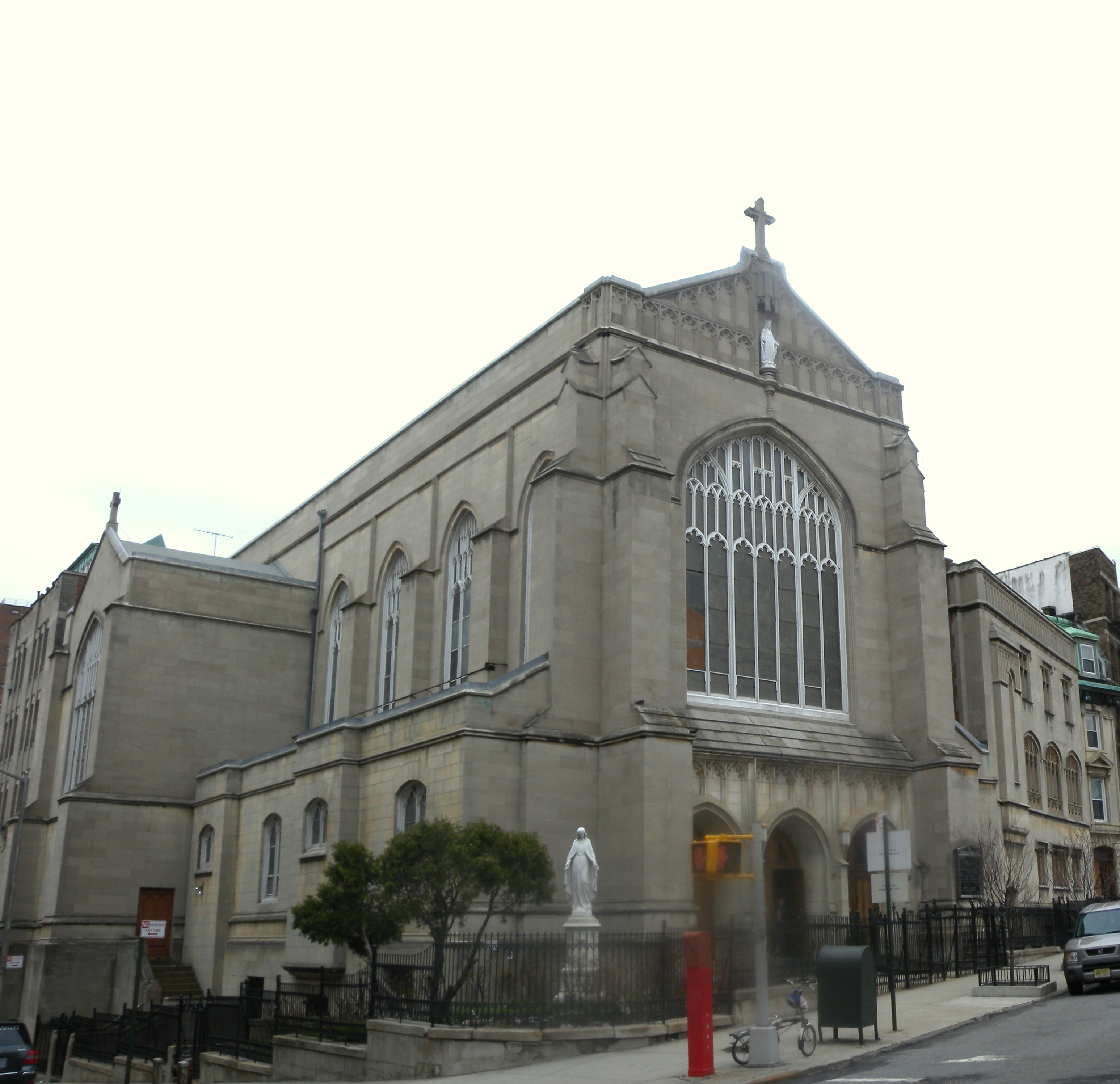
- Church of the Annunciation
- Location: 88 Convent Ave, New York, NY 10027
- Country: USA
- Denomination: Roman Catholic
- Website: www.theannunciation.net

History
- Founded: October, 1853
- Founder: Rev. Arthur J. Donnelly

Architecture
- Architect(s): Lynch and Orchard (Elliott Lynch and William R. Orchard) Fr. José María Clavero, Sch.P. Fr. Paulinus Ngwatung Abose Fr. José Victorino Carreras Floreano

Administration
- Diocese: Archdiocese of New York
- Parish: Church of the Annunciation

The Church of the Annunciation is a Roman Catholic parish church, located in Manhattanville/West Harlem in Manhattan. Founded in 1853, it is a parish of the Archdiocese of New York under the pastoral care of the Piarist Fathers. The church is located at 88 Convent Avenue. Annunciation School is located at 461 West 131st Street but was closed in 2014. The pastor is Fr. Jomon Mudiyil Joy, Sch.P.

== History ==
The parish was founded in October, 1852 by Archbishop John Hughes with the Rev. Arthur J. Donnelly as the first pastor.

The congregation first met in a donated colonial-style house that also included classrooms and sleeping quarters for the students of nearby Academy of the Holy Infancy, the precursor to the present Manhattan College. The cornerstone of the church was laid at West 131st St and Old Broadway on November 27, 1853, by Archbishop Gaetano Bedini, the first Papal envoy to the United States. The church was completed and dedicated in the Winter of 1854 by the Very Reverend William Stares, Vicar General of the Archdiocese of New York. Students of Manhattan College used the church for prayer, retreats, baccalaureate Masses and graduation.

By the turn of the 20th century, Manhattanville became more urbanized from country estates in the previous century. The congregation, largely Irish outgrew the old church. The cornerstone for a new church was laid at West 131st St and Convent Avenue in September 1906. The church was completed and dedicated on December 15, 1907, by Archbishop John Farley. The church building seats 700. The stained glass windows, brass altar rail and baptismal font were taken from the old church.

A school was built with the church on West 131st Street between Amsterdam and Convent Avenues, with a new addition in 1964.

In 1977, the church was put under the pastoral guidance of the Piarist Fathers.
