= Elliott Lynch =

American architect

- Known for: Architect

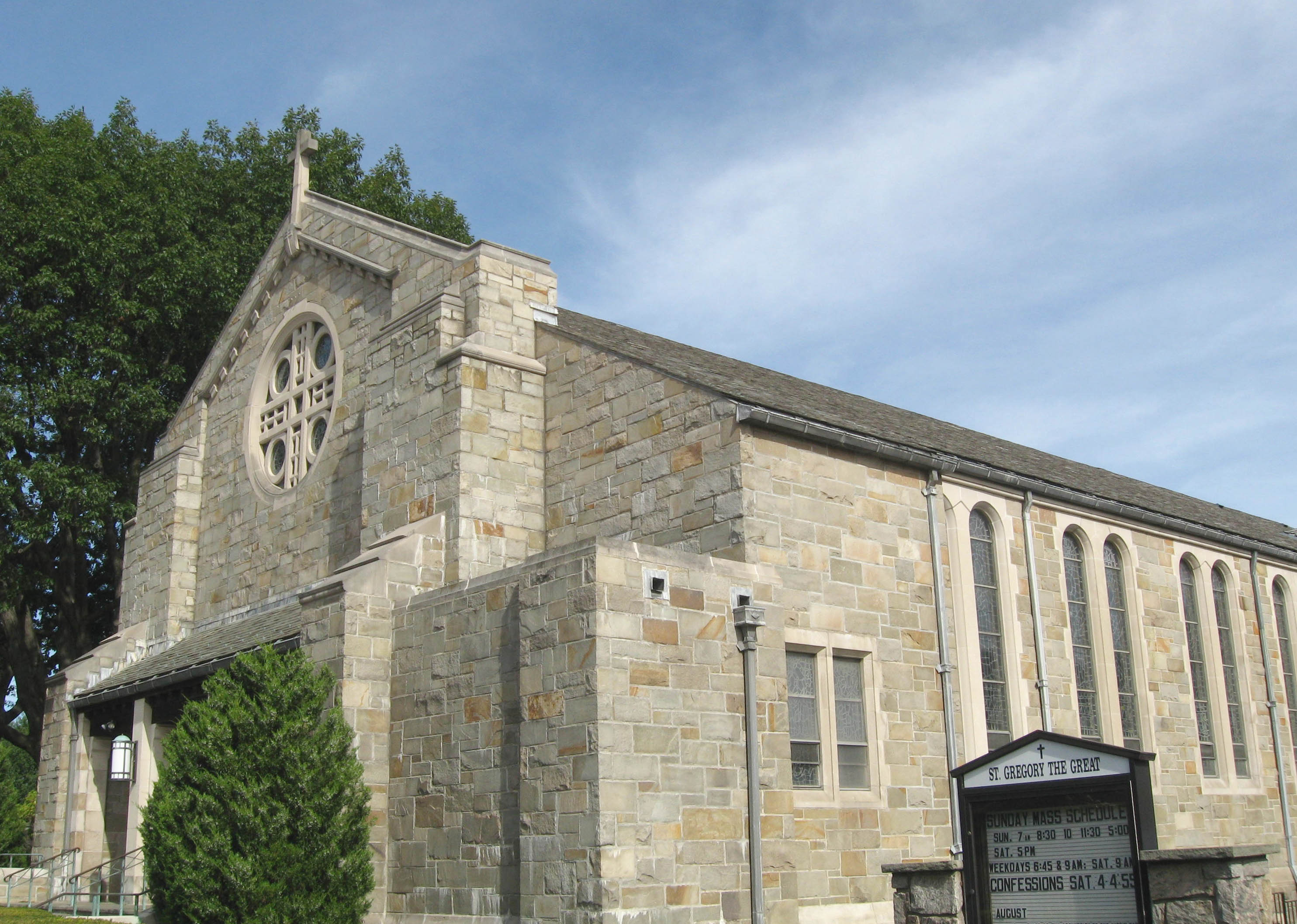
St Gregory the Great, Harrison, New York

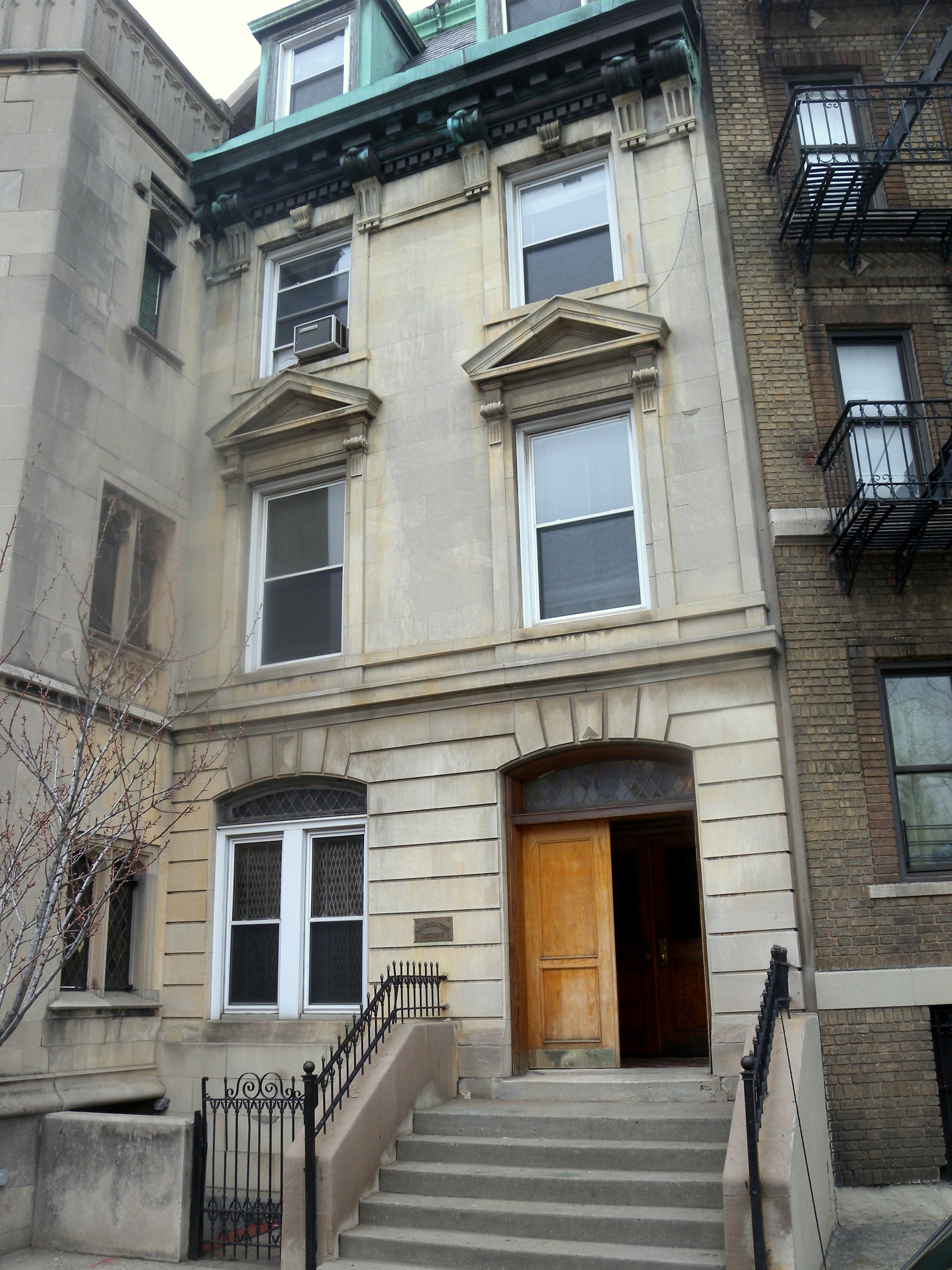
Rectory of the Church of the Annunciation in Manhattan at 88 Convent Avenue

Elliott Lynch, AIA, was an American architect active in the late 19th and early 20th centuries in New York City. His office was located at 347 Fifth Avenue in Manhattan. Many of the buildings he designed remain standing.

For a time Lynch was a partner with William R. Orchard in the firm of Lynch and Orchard, which designed many buildings for the Roman Catholic Church.

== Works ==
- St. Stephen's Parish School (Manhattan) (1897 – c.1902), Manhattan, New York City. The school was completed by 1902
- The Parkview (1902), Central Park West, New York City.
- Church of the Annunciation (1906-1907), New York City (with William R. Orchard as Lynch and Orchard).
- 88 Convent Avenue (1903), a 4-story brick and stone rectory. Built for the Roman Catholic Church of the Annunciation, New York City.
- St. Matthew's Roman Catholic Church, Brooklyn, New York
- St. Saviour Church, Park Slope, Brooklyn
- 112 Amsterdam Avenue (1905), and 97th Street, a four-story brick and stone residential building built for the Parish of the Church of the Holy Name of Jesus (New York City) and 207 W 96th Street for $25,000.
- Sacred Heart Roman Catholic Church (1910), 1253 Shakespeare Ave. (W. 168 St.) Bronx, New York The New York Times reported in 1910: "New Bronx Church: Plans were filed for a new brick church and rectory to replace the present frame edifices of the Sacred Heart Roman Catholic Church, in Shakespeare Avenue, between 168th and 169th Streets. The church is to occupy a plot 75 by '280, and the rectory 25 by 280, the total cost being placed at 590000 by the architect, Elliott Lynch."
- St. Gregory the Great Roman Catholic Church and Parish School, New York City (1912), built for between $110,000-120,000.
- 110-12-14 West End Avenue (1915), a four-story fireproof garage built for Louis Richard at $40,000.
- 100 East Broadway and 131st Street, a four-story fireproof garage for the ALS Realty Corp at $75,000.
- Holy Trinity Church, Westfield, New Jersey
- St. Brendan Church, Flatbush, Brooklyn
- St. Raymond Church, East Rockaway, New York
- St. Gregory the Great Church, Harrison, New York
- St. Simon Church (1926 plan), New York City
- All Souls Church, East Orange, New Jersey
