= Kips Bay Court =

Building complex in Manhattan, New York

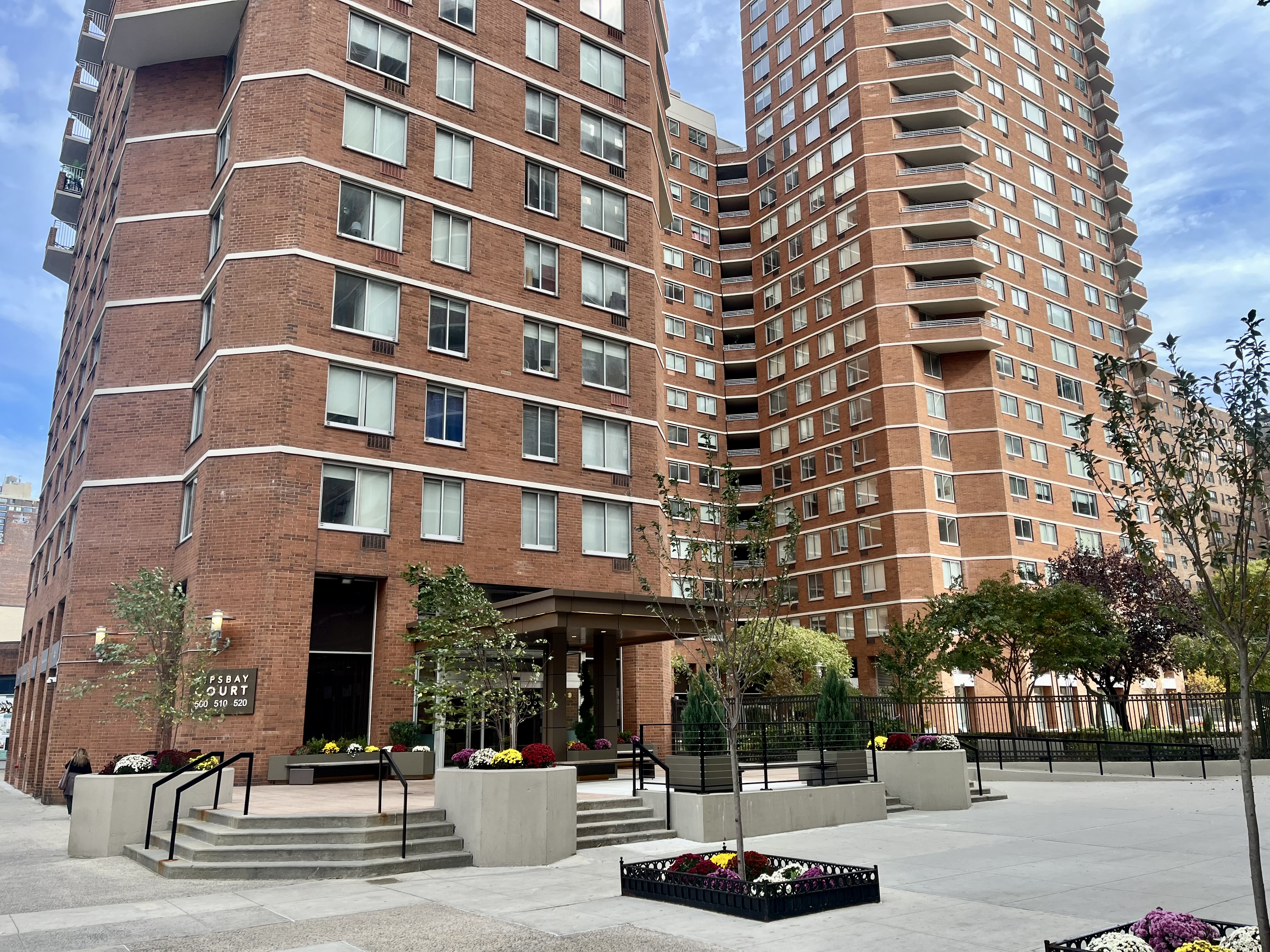
- Kips Bay Court in 2025
- Former names: Henry Phipps Plaza West; Phipps Plaza West

General information
- Location: Second Avenue from East 26th to 29th streets, Manhattan, New York, United States
- Coordinates: 40°44′26″N 73°58′42″W
- Opened: 1976
- Cost: $43 million
- Owner: Blackstone Group
- Operator: Beam Living

Technical details
- Floor count: 11–27
- Lifts/elevators: 16
- Grounds: 3.1 acres (1.3 ha)

Design and construction
- Architecture firm: Frost Associates
- Developer: Phipps Houses
- Main contractor: HRH Construction Corporation

Other information
- Number of units: 894
- Parking: 265 spaces

Website
- kipsbaycourt.com

Kips Bay Court is a housing complex located on the east side of Second Avenue between East 26th and 29th streets in the Kips Bay neighborhood of Manhattan in New York City, United States. Originally called Henry Phipps Plaza West, the eight-building complex contains a total of 894 apartments and was one of four housing developments sponsored by Phipps Houses in the Bellevue South Urban Renewal Project. Formerly a Mitchell–Lama Housing Program-funded rental project, Phipps Plaza West exited the Mitchell-Lama program in 2003 and was renamed Kips Bay Court. The complex was purchased by the Blackstone Group in 2016.

== History ==
=== Background ===
Henry Phipps Plaza West was developed as a result of the Bellevue South Urban Renewal Project, which had been approved by the City Planning Commission and Board of Estimate in 1964 and encompassed the area running between First and Second avenues from East 23rd to 30th streets in the Kips Bay neighborhood of Manhattan. The City Planning Commission held a public hearing for the proposed Phipps Plaza West project in September 1972, which called for nearly 900 apartments in eight buildings ranging from 12 to 27 stories in height. Seventy percent of the units were planned to be for middle-income families and the remaining thirty percent of the units were to be for residents having moderate incomes. The project was also planned to include a day care center, local retail, and community facilities. Plans for the buildings were filed with the city in 1972.

Phipps Plaza Housing Complex
Map of the Phipps Plaza housing complex, including the eight buildings of Kips Bay Court (formerly Phipps Plaza West)
1 460 Second Avenue (Kips Bay Court)
2 470 Second Avenue (Kips Bay Court)
3 480 Second Avenue (Kips Bay Court)
4 484 Second Avenue (Kips Bay Court)
5 490 Second Avenue (Kips Bay Court)
6 500 Second Avenue (Kips Bay Court)
7 510 Second Avenue (Kips Bay Court)
8 520 Second Avenue (Kips Bay Court)
9 331 East 29th Street (Phipps Plaza North)
10 485 First Avenue (Phipps Plaza East)
11 330 East 26th Street (Phipps Plaza South)
12 Bellevue South Park

The housing complex was sponsored by Phipps Houses, a nonprofit group founded in 1905 by Henry Phipps Jr. The group was the sponsor of four of the eight housing developments in the urban renewal project located in Kips Bay. The 894-unit Phipps Plaza West made up more than half of the 1,610 units developed by Phipps Houses; the other three developments included the 404-unit Phipps Plaza South (330 East 26th Street), the 208-unit Phipps Plaza North (331 East 29th Street) and the 104-unit Phipps Plaza East (485 First Avenue), which were completed in 1970, 1971 and 1974, respectively. Phipps Houses' original objective was to build housing within walking distance of Bellevue Hospital, New York University Medical Center and the Veterans Administration Hospital.

=== Opening and early years ===
A dedication ceremony to mark the completion of the Phipps Plaza housing complex with the opening of the $43 million Phipps Plaza West was held on October 14, 1976, and attended by Mayor Abraham Beame and Deputy Mayor Osborn Elliott. At the event, speakers noted that the project did not generally result in a net increase in population and that since many of the apartments were small, they would be occupied by elderly people that would put demands on public schools or the transportation system during rush hours. At that time, the community's major concern was the completion of a public park that had been established on the city map in 1966 as part of the Bellevue South Urban Renewal Project but had been delayed due to the city's fiscal crisis.

Phipps Plaza West was fully occupied within a year of its opening, using only word-of-mouth advertising. About 40 percent of the initial tenants were doctors, nurses and students; staff from local hospitals were given initial priority in renting apartments at the new complex. In November 1979, Bellevue South Park opened along the east side of Phipps Plaza West. The public park was maintained for seven years by the Better Bellevue Association, a coalition of residents and local groups including the Phipps Plaza Community Center.

The planned day care center, which occupied a 5,000-square-foot (460 m^{2}) area and had a capacity of 55 children, was not able to open as soon as the project was completed. A New York State resolution only allowed the proceeds of bond sales to be used for housing and "appurtenant facilities". While many other housing projects in New York City included supermarkets as appurtenant facilities, it took three years before state administrators were convinced that the day care center qualified as an appurtenant facility and could be counted on to pay its rent.

In 1980, a vacant space in the apartment complex (located at 309 East 26th Street in the base of 460 Second Avenue) was leased at a reduced rate to the Vineyard Theatre, which reconfigured the 1,700-square-foot (160 m^{2}) ground floor space into an odd-shaped 65-seat off-off-Broadway theatre that was used for concerts, operas and plays. The success of Vineyard Theatre led to the nonprofit theater group receiving donations to construct a 130-seat venue in a larger space in the basement of the Zeckendorf Towers near Union Square. The group opened its new venue in 1989, but retained its original location at Phipps Plaza West as rehearsal space. The space at 309 East 26th Street was later reconfigured by the Write Act Repertory Theatre and called the Richmond Shepard Theatre after its owner Richmond Shepard.

Phipps Plaza West is a naturally occurring retirement community (NORC). The housing complex was originally designed to include a 5,000-square-foot (460 m^{2}) community center with a lounge for elderly tenants and provided programs for seniors. The Phipps Plaza West NORC program was established at the complex in 1999, which was led by the Phipps Community Development Corporation and had the Jewish Home and Hospital Lifecare System as its health partner. There were about 600 elderly tenants residing in the complex in 2003, many of which were women with low or moderate incomes.

=== Withdrawal from Mitchell-Lama ===
Phipps Plaza West had originally been developed by Phipps Houses as a Mitchell–Lama Housing Program-funded rental project with the financial support of over 60 individual investors. The group of limited partners—called Bellevue South Associates—indicated to Phipps Houses in 1989 that they wanted to withdraw the housing complex from the Mitchell-Lama program when its contract came up for renewal in 1996 (Mitchell-Lama developments occupied after 1974 can elect to leave the program after a period of 20 years and become a market-rate rental complex). Phipps Houses opposed withdrawing from the program, but the limited partners later sued to force its removal. The investors accepted a plan by Phipps Houses to seek Section 8 vouchers to assist low-income tenants in paying their increased rent, keeping units affordable for those that would qualify for the federal program. The plan to withdraw from the Mitchell-Lama program was announced in January 2002, and the Phipps Plaza West Tenants Association filed a lawsuit that delayed the buyout until 2003. The rent increases went into effect in October 2003 and the housing complex was renamed Kips Bay Court.

Phipps Houses put the Kips Bay Court complex on the market in June 2016. The number of units receiving Section 8 vouchers had decreased from 651 in 2004 to 355 in 2016; the offering memo projected that by 2027 only 69 such units would remain as a result of natural turnover. For the Section 8 units, the landlord was receiving about ten percent lower compared to what they would have received under a free market rent. The Blackstone Group purchased Kips Bay Court for $620 million in December 2016. The transaction took place a year after Blackstone had spent $5.3 billion on the purchase of Stuyvesant Town–Peter Cooper Village, a large residential development located on the east side of First Avenue from East 14th to 23rd streets.

In 2018, Target Corporation signed a lease for 21,000 square feet (2,000 m^{2}) of space at 512 Second Avenue (at the corner of East 29th Street), which it opened as one of its small-format stores the following year. It was the fifth small-format store opened by Target in Manhattan.

== Architecture ==
=== Design ===
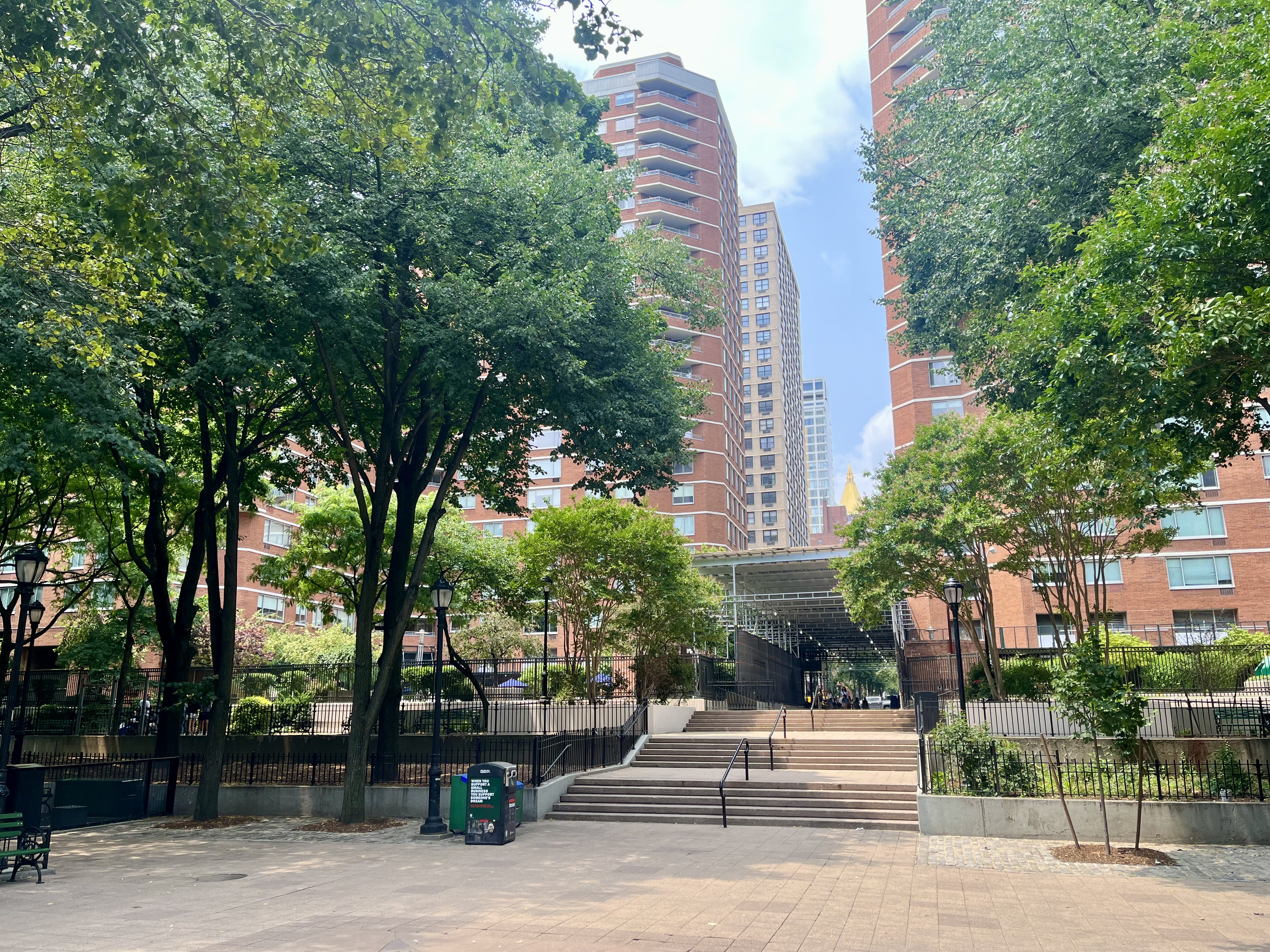
Looking west from Bellevue South Park at the pedestrian way on East 27th Street that passes through the housing complex

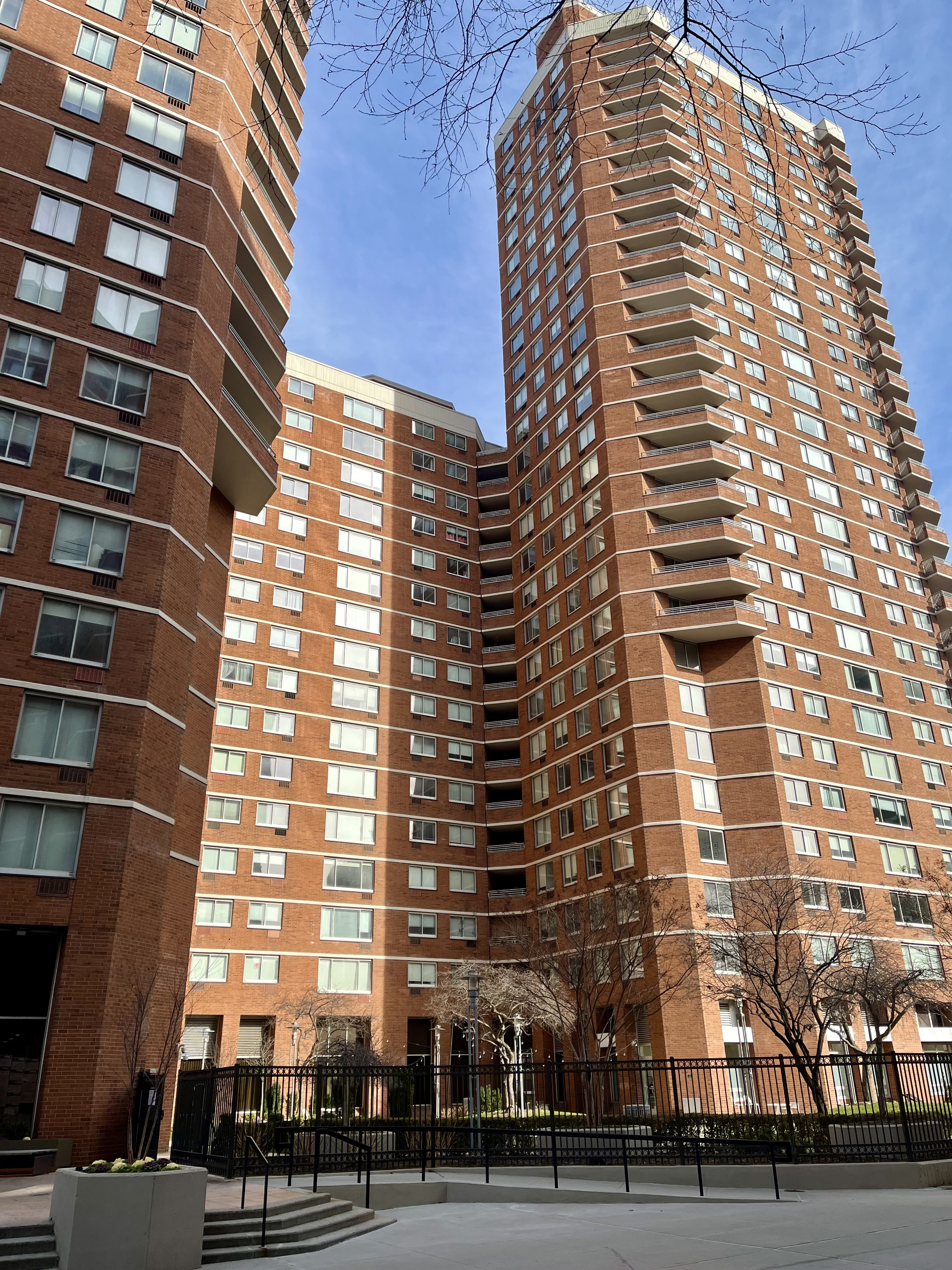
View of the northern cluster of buildings from the pedestrian way on East 28th Street

The original design for the project called for a single 20-story building extending along Second Avenue that spanned over the corridors on East 27th and 28th streets that had been converted to pedestrian ways as part of the remapping of the street grid for the Bellevue South Urban Renewal Project.

The plan to construct one massive building was changed by Lynda Simmons, the vice president and director of development for Phipps Houses, and was broken into eight separate buildings of varying heights (11, 16 or 27 stories) with about 5,000 square feet (460 m^{2}) per floor in an attempt to give tenants a sense of individuality. The towers were linked at the corners at angles to create three clusters of buildings, which kept four open sides on each of the towers. Prior to joining Phipps Houses as a staff architect in 1969, Simmons worked at Davis, Brody & Associates and was the project director of the firm's design of the East Midtown Plaza apartment complex at the south end of the Bellevue South Urban Renewal Project on Second Avenue between East 23rd and 25th streets.

With the apartments to be constructed out of concrete using formwork, Simmons knew that concrete pours smaller than 10,000 square feet (930 m^{2}) were not cost effective and that twice as many elevators (two per tower for a total of 16) would be required, so she made the contractors part of the design team. The solution devised by HRH Construction Corporation was to rearrange the buildings so that a crane could pour concrete for three buildings at a time in two locations and pour concrete for two buildings at a time in another location. The change in design resulted in a net savings of $2 million, which was more than enough to cover the cost of the additional elevators that were needed to serve the separate towers. The revised design placed only six apartments per floor, allowing four of them to be corner apartments with cross ventilation and views in more than one direction. Similar to the design of East Midtown Plaza, Simmons had the corners of the buildings cut off.

Other techniques used by Simmons in the design of the housing complex to improve its livability included: including larger windows to provide more light and so that tenants could look outside when seated; locating terraces typically above the eighth floor and tucking them into corners to create a sense of privacy; arranging kitchens that open into the dining areas, with views outside through sliding glass doors (for the apartments with terraces); adding stainless steel panels to the walls of hallways to act as mirrors (and provide more sense of security so someone could not hide behind a corner); creating a private backyard for each cluster of buildings; and providing laundry rooms on the ground floor with views of the rear gardens or Second Avenue (as opposed to putting them in the basement).

The architecture firm responsible for the design of Phipps Plaza West was Frost Associates, and Simmons worked with Nembhard Culin of Frost Associates to incorporate her design changes. Frost Associates had been the designer of the other three developments in the Bellevue South Urban Renewal Project that were sponsored by Phipps Houses.

On the exterior of the complex, Simmons had the wall of the underground parking garage shifted five feet (1.5 m) to the interior of the site to allow for a double row of trees along the sidewalk. A paved area elevated about three feet (0.91 m) higher than the sidewalk was provided near the building entrances to serve as a psychological barrier to prevent the public from loitering in these areas.

=== Reception ===
Soon after Phipps Plaza West opened, the housing complex was found to be well received by its tenants in an environmental psychology evaluation conducted by the Center for Human Environments at the City University of New York Graduate Center. In his 1979 book The City Observed, the author Paul Goldberger noted the similarities of the housing complex to East Midtown Plaza and wrote "The knockoff isn't quite as good, but it, too, comes a long way from the scaleless boxes of most publicly assisted housing." The AIA Guide to New York City also likened Phipps Plaza West's polygonal shapes and diagonals to the styling of East Midtown Plaza, but commented that "it fails to honor any street, as does East Midtown's glorious bow to 23rd".
