= Bellevue South Park =

Public park in Manhattan, New York

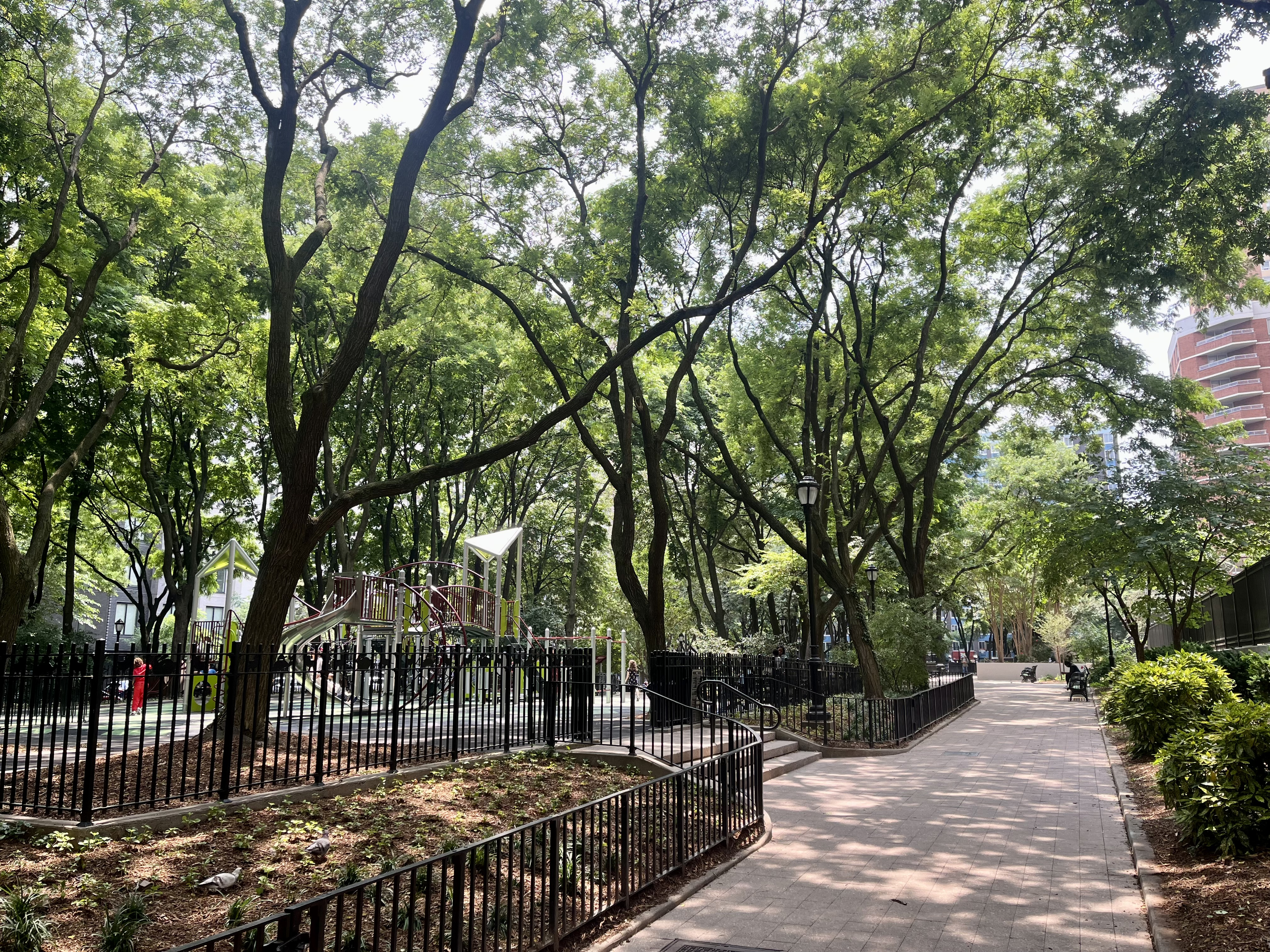
- Bellevue South Park in 2023
- Interactive map of Bellevue South Park
- Type: Urban park
- Location: Kips Bay, Manhattan, New York City
- Coordinates: 40°44′24″N 73°58′41″W
- Area: 1.59 acres (0.64 ha)
- Opened: 1979
- Operator: New York City Department of Parks and Recreation

Bellevue South Park is a 1.59-acre (0.64 ha) public park in the Kips Bay neighborhood of Manhattan, New York City. Located on the west side of Mount Carmel Place between East 26th and 28th streets, the park was originally planned as part of the Bellevue South Urban Renewal Area approved by New York City in 1964. The park did not open until 1979 due to a lack of municipal funding during the city's fiscal crisis and local community groups were originally responsible for the park's upkeep before maintenance was transferred over to the New York City Department of Parks and Recreation in 1986.

== History ==
=== Establishment of park ===
Bellevue South Park is located within the Bellevue South Urban Renewal Area, an urban renewal project that was approved by the New York City Planning Commission and New York City Board of Estimate in 1964 and encompassed the area between First Avenue and Second Avenue from East 23rd to 30th streets. Although the park and urban renewal area are both located to the west of Bellevue Hospital, the name "Bellevue South" reflects its location to the south of another urban renewal area—the NYU-Bellevue Urban Renewal Area—that covered the area between First and Second avenues from East 30th to 33rd streets and resulted in the development of Kips Bay Plaza.

The new park was established on the city map on May 24, 1966, along with the conversion of portions of East 27th and 28th streets between First and Second avenues to pedestrian malls. The changes to the street grid also included the establishment of a new north–south street running along the east side of the park between East 26th and 28th streets that was simply referred to as "A New Street" on the city map until it was named "Mount Carmel Place" in 1989 to commemorate the centennial of the arrival of Carmelite priests in New York City who had established the Church of Our Lady of the Scapular of Mount Carmel on East 28th Street across from the park.

Construction of the park was delayed through the 1970s during New York City's fiscal crisis because the city lacked the municipal funds needed to obtain matching federal funding. In the mid-1970s, the New York City Housing and Development Administration proposed placing a private concession with a tennis bubble on the northern part of the site and with a small park to the south. This idea was met with opposition from the local community and a committee of Planning Board 6 explored other options to fund construction of a full-sized park to accommodate residents living in the moderate- and low-income housing developments within the urban renewal area. The Phipps Plaza West housing complex was completed on the west side of the planned park in 1976.

In 1978, construction of the park began under the New York City Department of Housing Preservation and Development's Site Improvement Program using federal community development funds. The park was built by the city with the understanding that it would be maintained by community groups for ten years before maintenance responsibilities were transferred over to the New York City Department of Parks and Recreation. The park cost $973,000 to complete and opened in November 1979. To raise the money needed for the upkeep of the park and to provide funding for concerts and other activities, local residents organized fundraisers including a "Parks for People" block party in September 1977 and an "Autumn Jubilee" street fair on Second Avenue that was held annually by the Bellevue South Community Association beginning in 1985. Maintenance of the park was taken over by the New York City Department of Parks and Recreation in September 1986 after the effects of the city's fiscal crisis had subsided.

=== Renovations ===
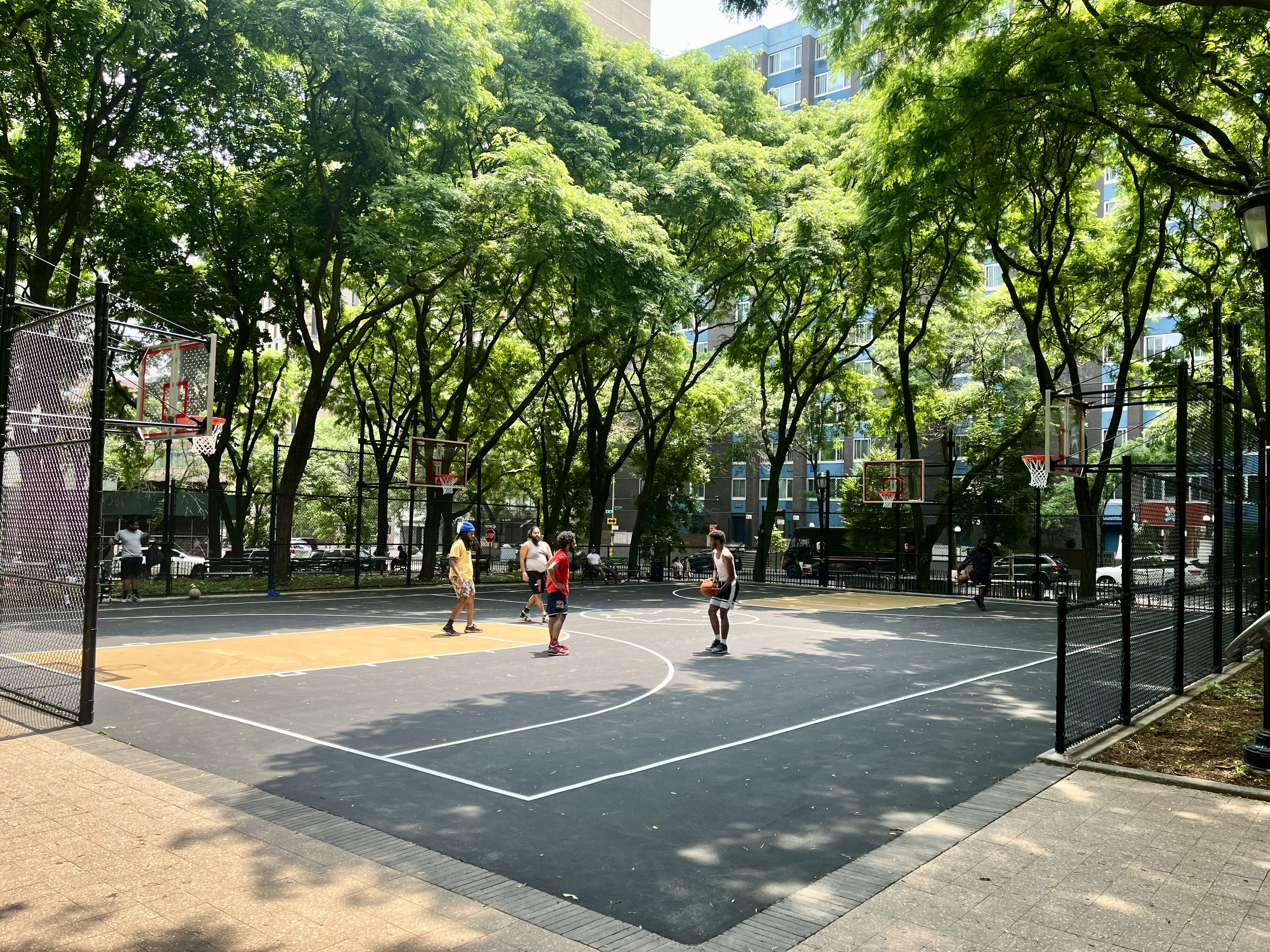
Basketball court in June 2023

Bellevue South Park underwent a $2 million renovation in 1997, which included the addition of playgrounds and a basketball court, the replacement of paved areas with trees and landscaping, and the removal of a concrete wall around the perimeter that, according to local residents, had contributed to illicit activities occurring inside the park. Despite the renovations, the park continued to face problems of being overrun by homeless from a nearby shelter and individuals who used alcohol and drugs in the park.

Construction of a $5 million renovation of the park began in May 2022, which includes the replacement of the south playground with an ADA-accessible dog run, reconstruction of the north playground and basketball court, and the installation of community gardens and additional lighting along the central plaza. The improvements to the park came as a result of several years of discussions with local residents, a group of which specifically requested an accessible dog run and worked to have a temporary dog run opened in the park at the beginning of 2018. Other community members wanted to improve the safety of the park by moving the adult fitness equipment away from the playgrounds and removing park benches to dissuade the homeless from loitering near the areas where children play. The renovations to the park were completed in June 2023.

=== Public art ===
In 2001, Antoni Milkowski's sculpture "Skagerrak", a 7-foot-tall (2.1 m) abstract representation of the Skagerrak strait running between Denmark, Norway and Sweden, was relocated from Madison Square Park to Bellevue South Park.
