= Annunciation School (New York City) =

Location
- 88 Convent Ave; Manhattanville, New York City 10027; United States; 40.816473°N 73.952775°W

Information
- Type: Roman Catholic elementary school
- Opened: 1852
- Closed: 2013
- Website: www.annunciationschoolnyc.org

Annunciation School was a co-educational Roman Catholic elementary school established in 1852 as a school for boys. It was part of Annunciation Church parish in the Archdiocese of New York. The school building, which was dedicated in 1907, is located at 461 West 131st Street in New York City's area of Manhattanville.

At the conclusion of the 2012–2013 school year, Annunciation School permanently closed. The school building is presently used by a network charter school.

== History ==
=== The Brothers' School ===
Since the establishment of the parish in 1852, the Christian Brothers of Manhattan College (when it was located on Old Broadway in Manhattan), ran a school for the boys of the parish, initially on the college property and then at a small building on West 131st Street and Amsterdam Ave. It was known as the Brothers' School.

=== The Convent School and later arrival of the Dominican Sisters ===
In 1850 a boarding school for girls was established by the Religious of the Sacred Heart on the property of Manhattanville College, known as the Convent School. A new school building was erected on West 130th St/Convent Ave in 1872, to be rebuilt in 1888 following its destruction by a fire.

The Christian Brothers continued to oversee Annunciation School until 1922, when Manhattan College relocated out of the area.

The Most. Rev. John J. Dunn, Auxiliary Bishop of New York and pastor of Annunciation Church engaged the Dominican Sisters (a.k.a. Order of Preachers) of St. Mary of the SpringsColumbus, OH to teach and administrate Annunciation School.

=== Co-Ed ===
In 1952, the Religious of the Sacred Heart and Manhattanville College moved to Purchase, NY leaving the girls' school without teachers. The girls were moved to the Boys School and the Girls' School building was leased out, eventually becoming part of City College of New York. In 1953 there were 425 boys and 415 girls in the school.

New School Building

In 1961, under Fr. Thomas Donnelly (later Monsignor Donnelly) pastor of Annunciation Church, the parish bought and demolished three apartment buildings on Amsterdam Avenue to build a new addition to the school. The cornerstone was laid in 1963 and the school was dedicated on May 31, 1964, by the Most Rev. Edward Dargin, auxiliary bishop of New York.

=== Piarist Fathers ===
In 1977, the church was placed under the pastoral guidance of the Piarist Fathers. Consequently, the Piarists have been overseeing the school ever since. In 1978, the Dominican Sisters gave up the administration of the school, although some sisters remained teaching for some time. The Piarist Fathers are officially known as the Order of the Poor Clerics Regular of the Mother of God of the Pious Schools. The order's mission is educating youth worldwide.
