= Jeremiah Williams Cummings =

American writer (1814–1866)

Jeremiah Williams Cummings (April 1814, in Washington, D.C., U.S.A. – January 4, 1866 at New York) was an American Roman Catholic priest, known as a preacher and writer.

== Life ==
Cummings was born in Washington, D.C., where his oldest sister entered the Georgetown Visitation Monastery. His father's death caused his mother to move to New York in his boyhood, and he was there accepted as an ecclesiastical student by Bishop John Dubois, who sent him first to a college Dubois had established in Nyack, and then to the Pontifical Urban College for the Propagation of the Faith at Rome to make his theological studies. Afterwards he returned to New York, where he was assigned as one of the assistants at St. Patrick's Cathedral. He there proved himself as linguist, writer, and musician, and a popular preacher and lecturer.

In 1848 Bishop John Hughes selected him to found St. Stephen's parish, New York, and to erect a church. Under the administration of Dr. Cummings St. Stephen's, which he had completed in March, 1854, became a fashionable and frequented church in New York, its sermons and music making it a local attraction. On occasion well-known singers from the Metropolitan Opera House would sing with the choir. He continued as its pastor till his death.

== Controversy ==
Cummings was the intimate friend and disciple of Orestes A. Brownson, the philosopher and reviewer. He was instrumental in having Brownson change his residence from Boston to New York, took charge of his lecture arrangements, and wrote frequent contributions for Brownson's Review. "It was often complained of in Brownson", says his son (Middle Life, Detroit, 1899, p. 132), "that he was lacking in policy, and no doubt he was in the habit of plain speaking; but Cummings was more so, and some of the most violent attacks on the editor and his 'Review' were occasioned by unpalatable truths plainly stated by Cummings".

Cummings was one of the leaders in a group of priests and laymen, who were opposed to what they called the "Europeanizing" of the Catholic church in the United States by the foreign-born teachers, to the system of teaching in vogue in the Catholic colleges and seminaries, and who were in favour of conciliating those outside the Catholic church by the use of milder polemics. In an article on "Vocations to the Priesthood" that Cummings contributed to Brownson's Review of October, 1860, he severely criticized the management and mode of instruction in Catholic colleges and seminaries which he styled "cheap priest-factories". This aroused a bitter controversy, and brought out one of the noted essays by Archbishop Hughes, his "Reflections on the Catholic Press".

== Works ==
Cummings wrote Songs for Catholic Schools and Aids to Memory for the Catechism (1862). His hymn "Hail Virgin of Virgins" was later published under a variety of melodies.

He was also a contributor to Appleton's Encyclopedia and published in New York:

- Italian Legends (1859);
- Spiritual Progress (1865);
- The Silver Stole.
