= Congregation Talmud Torah Adereth El =

Orthodox synagogue in New York City

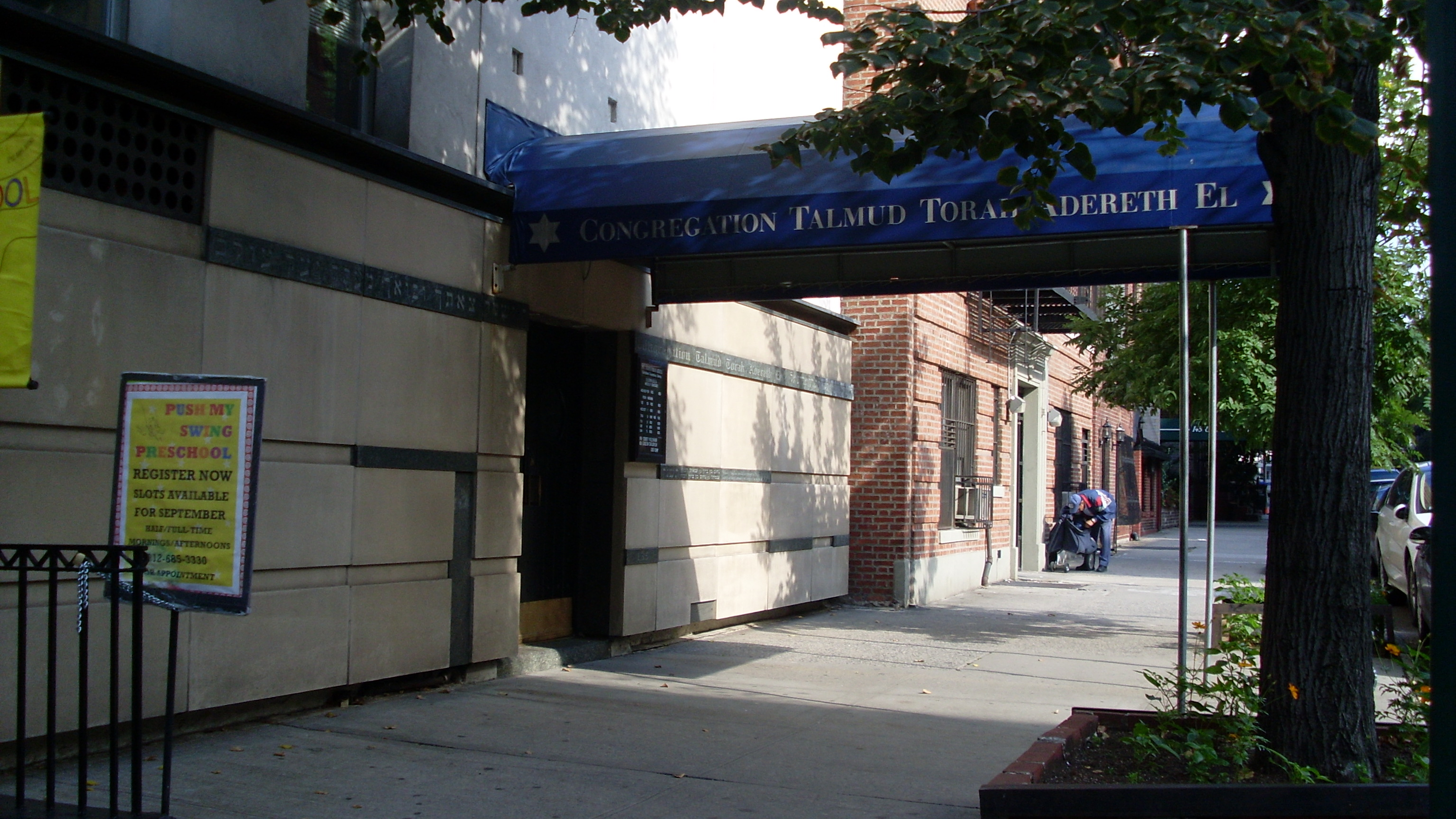
- Congregation Talmud Torah Adereth El

- Location in Lower Manhattan

Religion
- Affiliation: Orthodox Judaism
- Ecclesiastical or organisational status: Synagogue
- Leadership: Rabbi Shua Mermelstein; Rabbi Gideon Shloush
- Status: Active

Location
- Location: 133–135 East 29th Street, Rose Hill, Manhattan, New York City, New York
- Country: United States
- Coordinates: 40°44′36″N 73°58′53″W

Architecture
- Architect: Gustave Iser (1945)
- Established: 1857 (as a congregation)
- Completed: 1863 (first build); 1945 (renovations); 1994 (renovations)

Website
- aderethel.org

Congregation Talmud Torah Adereth El, abbreviated as Adereth El, is an Orthodox Jewish synagogue located on East 29th Street between Third and Lexington Avenues in the Rose Hill neighborhood of Manhattan, New York City, New York, United States.

Founded in 1857, it claims to be the oldest synagogue in its original location with continuous services at the same location.

== History ==
The Adereth El synagogue was founded by German Jewish immigrants in the fall of 1857. The synagogue opened a building on its current site on 29th Street in 1863, having purchased the lot for $5,000. The site was expanded in 1920 with the purchase of the three-story building at 133 East 29th Street. The present building, is the result of a 1945 renovation by architect Gustave Iser, followed by a 1994 renovation that "left little of the façade except the Star of David".

== Clergy ==
Before he died in June 2013 at 100 years of age, Rabbi Sidney Kleiman was both the longest-serving and oldest active congregational rabbi in the United States. Rabbi Kleiman served as the congregation's rabbi since 1939 until 1996, when Rabbi Gideon Shloush joined the synagogue and Rabbi Kleiman became rabbi emeritus.

After serving for a year in a part-time role, the current rabbi, since July 2021, is Rabbi Shua Mermelstein.

== Congregation ==
Adereth El's current membership reflects the diversity of its neighborhood, Murray Hill. During the work week, many Jewish businessmen with nearby offices pray at the synagogue. Of note, many Adereth El members are students and faculty at the nearby New York University (NYU) medical center. The synagogue's proximity to the hospital also brings in many hospital patients’ visitors as guests at Adereth El services. In fact, the synagogue typically has multiple weekly baby-naming ceremonies due to the large number of labor and delivery visitors. Additionally, due to Adereth El's location near Yeshiva University’s Stern College for Women, many Stern students regularly attend the synagogue's services.

In 2007, the congregation marked its 150th anniversary with a series of celebrations. A lecture series highlighted the history of Jews in New York City. A gala dinner was held at the Battery Gardens Restaurant in Battery Park in March.

== See also ==
- Oldest synagogues in the United States
