= Louis Frederick Bernecker =

American artist

Louis Frederick Berneker (1876–1937) was an American artist, active as a painter, illustrator, and graphic artist in late-nineteenth- and early twentieth-century New York. He is known to have painted the angel murals (painted on canvas) decorating the interior of St. Gregory the Great's Church, New York City, and to have painted the November 1906 and March 1907 covers of Pearson's Magazine. In 1931, Berneker was elected to the National Academy of Design as an Associate member.
