= Central Park Hospital =

- Shown in New York City

Geography
- Location: Central Park, New York City, New York, United States
- Coordinates: 40.781°N 73.966°W

Organization
- Care system: Military
- Type: Military

History
- Former names: U.S. General Hospital, Central Park
- Founded: 1862
- Closed: 1865

Links
- Lists: Hospitals in New York State
- Other links: Hospitals in Manhattan

The Central Park Hospital (officially the U.S. General Hospital, Central Park) was a military hospital that operated in New York City during the American Civil War, from 1862 to 1865. It occupied the former grounds of Mount St. Vincent's Academy near 102nd St and East Drive in Central Park, just west of Fifth Avenue and atop the Revolutionary War site of McGowan's Pass. In medical and military records it is usually referred to as the United States General Hospital, Central Park; and sometimes elsewhere as St. Joseph's Military Hospital (as it was named by Sisters of Charity, who built the complex and provided nursing staff).

== Mount Saint Vincent ==
The Sisters of Charity of New York arrived in New York City in 1817, at the request of Bishop John Connolly, to staff an orphanage he had founded. In 1846, they incorporated as a separate community from the motherhouse in Emmitsburg, Maryland. The following year, they purchased seven acres at McGowan's Pass and established the Academy of Mount Saint Vincent. A building for classrooms, study and recreation halls was completed built 1850, followed in 1855 by a large brick building containing a chapel and dining halls. Shortly thereafter residents of the area were advised that they would have to vacate in anticipation of the construction of Central Park and the academy relocated to the Edwin Forrest estate in the Bronx. The park project entered the design phase and the buildings remained vacant.

== Hospital ==
At the outset of the war, many of the sisters volunteered to be nurses, but Archbishop John Hughes denied permission for them to leave New York, where he felt they were needed. The Commissioners of Central Park suggested to the City Council that the empty buildings at McGowan's Pass could serve as a military hospital. Alderman Terence Farley recommended the sisters staff it. (In response to the cholera epidemic of 1849, the sisters had opened St. Vincent's Hospital, which also treated those affected by the typhoid epidemic in 1852.)

In September 1862 Judge Edwards Pierrepont, a member of the Union Defense Committee, and influential supporter of President Lincoln wrote Secretary of War Edwin Stanton advising him that the nursing be handled by the Sisters of Charity under the direction of the War Department. The War Department was glad to receive the offer of a location that could accommodate 250 patients as well as a trained staff. The matter was forwarded to Charles McDougall, medical director at New York.

Under the direction of Sr. Mary Ulrica O’Reilly, fourteen volunteers returned to McGowans Pass to tend the sick and wounded. O'Reilly had previously served at St. Vincent's Hospital. The hospital, called unofficially St. Joseph's Military Hospital, opened in October 1862. Four surgeons from St. Vincent's provided their services pro bono. Patients with communicable diseases were housed in isolation tents on the grounds. The sisters "did the housekeeping chores, distributed supplies, dressed wounds, dispensed medication, kept patients clean and fed, and occasionally assisted the surgeons with amputations and other medical procedures." Some succumbed to illnesses contracted while at St. Joseph's.

O'Reilly was reprimanded by Surgeon-in-charge Frank Hastings Hamilton when she exceeded her allocation in providing Thanksgiving dinner to the patients. Eight months later, when draft rioters demanded the sisters leave the premises, she told them that the sisters would not abandon their patients and mob went elsewhere. The sisters remained at the hospital until the last patient was discharged in 1867. Mc Dougall would later say that of the five military hospitals under his supervision, St. Joseph's was the only one that never gave him any trouble.

== Later use ==
Following the Civil War the buildings and site became a sculpture museum and restaurant, called variously the Mount St. Vincent Hotel, Stetson's Hotel, and the McGown's Pass Tavern. Today the site is used by the Central Park Conservancy as a composting area.

It should not be confused with Park Hospital, which was the renamed Red Cross Hospital also located on Central Park in New York City from 1914 to 1922 and which the current New York University Hospital is partly descended from.
