= Church of Our Lady of the Scapular of Mount Carmel =

Demolished church in Manhattan, New York

Coordinates: 40°44′26″N 73°58′36″W

Church of Our Lady of the Scapular of Mount Carmel (Former)
- Interactive map of the Church of Our Lady of the Scapular of Mount Carmel (Former) area

General information
- Architectural style: Gothic Revival
- Location: New York, New York, United States of America
- Completed: 1889
- Demolished: 1991
- Client: The Roman Catholic Archdiocese of New York

The Church of Our Lady of the Scapular of Mount Carmel was a former Roman Catholic parish church located at 341 East 28th Street between First and Second Avenues in the Kips Bay neighborhood of Manhattan, New York City.

The parish was established in 1889 by Carmelite Fathers from Ireland and was the first Carmelite church in the United States. The new parish was split off from the Church of St. Stephen the Martyr and covered the area from East 24th to East 33rd streets between Second Avenue and the East River. The decision of Archbishop Michael Corrigan to split off St. Stephen's parish is believed to be related to the excommunication of its pastor Edward McGlynn in 1887 as a means to appease the parishioners who supported McGlynn. The parish's first masses were held on April 14, 1889 in Duke's Tobacco Factory at First Avenue and East 29th Street. A new church was erected on East 28th Street that same year and was designed in the Country Gothic style; the church was dedicated on December 22, 1889 by Archbishop Corrigan.

It was the original location of the National Shrine of Our Lady of Mount Carmel, which had been established in 1941 and was moved to Middletown, New York, in 1991.

The parish had a school for boys administered by the Brothers of the Christian Schools and a girls school staffed by the Sisters of Mercy.

In 1988 the Carmelites took over administration of the parish of St. Stephen the Martyr. The two parishes merged in 1990, with the newly combined parish named Our Lady of the Scapular–St. Stephen. In 1991, with the transfer in 1991 of the National Shrine of Our Lady of Mt. Carmel to Middletown, NY, Our Lady of the Scapular and the priory were torn down in 1991 and replaced by a 16-story apartment building. The Middletown property was considered a more suitable and beautiful spot for prayer and reflection.

Near the former site of the church, the small street that runs north-south from East 26th to East 28th streets between First and Second avenues along the east side of Bellevue South Park was named Mount Carmel Place in 1989 to commemorate the centennial of the arrival of Carmelite priests in New York City.

Carmelite fathers from the parish ministered patients at the nearby Bellevue Hospital for a period of 118 years, spanning the time from when the parish was founded in 1889 until 2007 when they were evicted from Church of Our Lady of the Scapular–St. Stephen.
