= Church of the Visitation (disambiguation) =

The Church of the Visitation is in Ein Karem, Jerusalem.

Church of the Visitation, dedicated to the Visitation (in German Mariä Heimsuchung), may also refer to (alphabetically by location):

- Basilica of the Visitation, Għarb
- Visitation of the Blessed Virgin Mary Church (Bronx, New York)
- Church of the Visitation of the Blessed Virgin Mary, Kraków
- Visitation of Mary Church (Ljubljana)
- Mariä Heimsuchung, Munich
- Church of the Visitation of the Virgin Mary, Nitra
- Church of the Visitation in the Rue St. Antoine, Paris, now the Temple du Marais
- Church of the Visitation of the Virgin Mary, Povazska Bystrica
- Church of the Visitation of the Blessed Virgin Mary (O'Connor, Nebraska)
- Church of the Visitation of the Blessed Virgin Mary, Warsaw
- Church of the Visitation of the Blessed Virgin Mary, Voćin
- Church of the Visitation (Westphalia, Texas)
- Mariä Heimsuchung, Wiesbaden
