= Timothy James Webb =

Australian painter, sculptor and musician

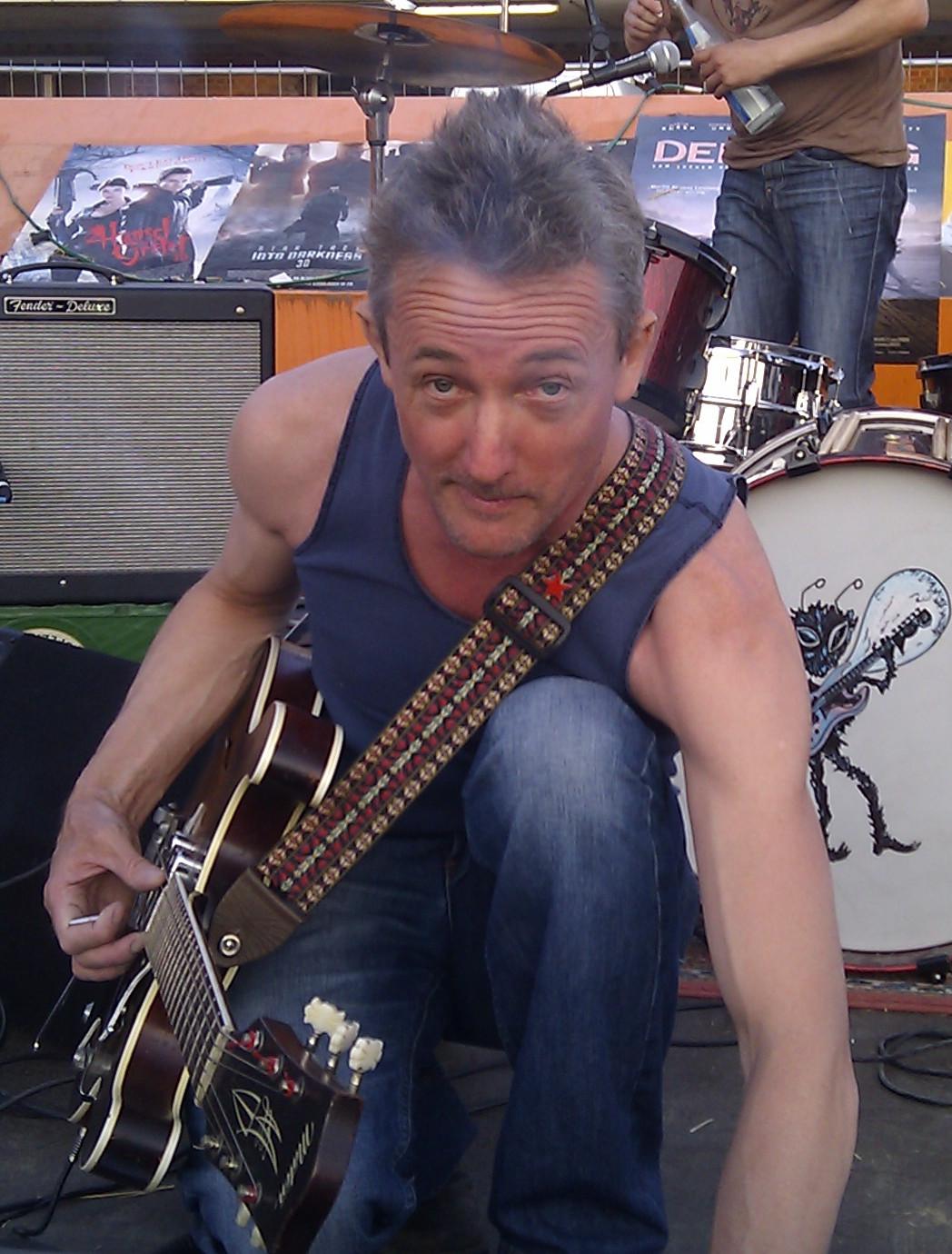
- Born: 13 February 1967 (age 59); Warburton, Victoria, Australia
- Education: Victorian College of the Arts (BFA); Royal Melbourne Institute of Technology (MFA)
- Known for: Painting, sculpture, music
- Awards: Dr Linda Mohr Acquisitive Award (1986); Hans and Sylvia Sumberg Prize (VCA, 1988); Theodor Urbach Encouragement Award (1988); Christine Abrahams Award (1988)

Timothy James Webb, as a musician also known as Tim J. Webb (born 13 February 1967 in Warburton, Victoria), is an Australian painter and sculptor, who has been living in Munich, Germany, since 2000.

== Biography ==
Webb studied at the Victorian College of the Arts in Melbourne from 1986 to 1988, where he got his BFA degree. Later, he graduated with an MFA from the Royal Melbourne Institute of Technology in 1998. In 2000 he moved to Munich, Germany, where he also plays guitar and sings in his band The Silverflies.

Some of his works belong to the collections of Sony/CBS in Melbourne, of the Australian Gallery of Sport and Olympic Museum, of the Melbourne Theatre Company, of the Melbourne City Council, of Arnon Milchan and of the collections of other notable families in Australia, in the United States, in the United Kingdom, in Ireland, Sweden and in Germany.

== Exhibitions ==
- 1989:
  - "St Kilda Festival works on paper exhibition", Linden Centre for Contemporary Arts, Acland Street, Melbourne (group exhibition)
  - "Recycled exhibitionauction cabaret exhibition", Fringe Network Gallery, Fitzroy (group exhibition)
- 1990:
  - "Give up your day job and take up art", Botanical Gallery, Melbourne (single exhibition)
  - "Art and life auction cabaretworks on paper exhibition", Fringe Network Gallery, Fitzroy (group exhibition)
- 1991:
  - "Let's face the music and dance", Botanical Gallery, Melbourne (single exhibition)
  - "Famous five", Botanical Gallery, Melbourne (group exhibition)
  - "Keith and Elisabeth Murdoch Prize exhibition", Victorian College of the Arts (group exhibition)
  - "Artists make books" (traveling exhibition), Linden Centre for Contemporary Arts, Canberra and Hobart (group exhibition)
  - "Summer wine", Botanical Gallery, Melbourne (group exhibition)
- 1992:
  - "It could happen to you", Botanical Gallery, Melbourne (single exhibition)
  - "100 years of Collingwood", Australian Gallery of Sport and Olympic Museum Collection, Melbourne (group exhibition)
  - "Artist play", Westpac Gallery, Melbourne (group exhibition)
  - "Waste management", Tolarno Galleries, St Kilda (group exhibition)
- 1993:
  - "Shaken not stirred", Botanical Gallery, Melbourne (single exhibition)
  - "Trials, training and treasures", Australian Gallery of Sport and Olympic Museum Collection, Melbourne (group exhibition)
  - "Fever, it's football", Artist's Garden, Fitzroy (group exhibition)
  - "The underpass show", The Fifth Sculpture Triennal Degraves Street Underpass, Melbourne (group exhibition)
  - "Summer 1993", Botanical Gallery, Melbourne (group exhibition)
- 1994:
  - "¿Quando mondo quando?", Botanical Gallery, Melbourne (single exhibition)
  - "Sport, the greatest show of all" (traveling exhibition), Adelaide Festival Centre, South Australia, Victoria und Northern Territory (group exhibition)
  - "Whitefriars Price exhibition", Whitefriars College, Donvale (group exhibition)
- 1995:
  - "Way out West", Scope Gallery, Fitzroy (single exhibition)
  - "Australia Felix", Benalla (group exhibition)
  - "Christmas 1995. Small works.", Scope Gallery, Fitzroy (group exhibition)
- 1996:
  - "Works on paper", Scope Gallery, Fitzroy (single exhibition)
  - "Centenary of football", Australian Gallery of Sport and Olympic Museum Collection, Melbourne (group exhibition)
  - "Food in art", Mornington Peninsula Regional Gallery, Mornington (group exhibition)
- 1997: "Romantic paintings from the early years. A survey.", Ossarya Gallery, Prahran (single exhibition)
- 1998:
  - "Paintings, drawings, prints", RMIT Faculty Gallery Melbourne (single exhibition)
  - "Paintings, drawings, prints", Australia Felix, Benalla (single exhibition)
- 1999:
  - "Flowers and ships", 325 Flinders Lane, Melbourne (single exhibition)
  - "Football is f#§!!ed!", Artist's Garden, Fitzroy (group exhibition)
  - "James Farrell's self portrait exhibition", Castlemaine Art Museum, Castlemaine (group exhibition)
- 2000: "Glückshafen", Orangerie at Englischer Garten, Munich (group exhibition)
- 2003:
  - "Neue Arbeiten", Mariä Heimsuchung Church Open Westend Weekend, Munich (single exhibition)
- "Eva und ihre Kinder", Arte Galerie N, Munich (group exhibition)
- "WURMS – 25 internationale Drachen", Kunstverein Worms, Kunsthaus Stiftung Heylshof, Worms (group exhibition)
  - "2003 Annual Exhibition", Kunstverein Traunstein, Traunstein City Gallery at Kunstraum Klosterkirche, Traunstein (group exhibition)
- 2004:
  - "World Wild Webb", 325 Flinders Lane, Melbourne (single exhibition)
  - "ARTiges 2004", Kunstverein Ottobrunn, Ottobrunn (group exhibition)
  - "2004 Annual Exhibition: Blaumachen", Kunstverein Traunstein, Traunstein City Gallery at Kunstraum Klosterkirche, Traunstein (group exhibition)
  - "Engel über Engel", St. Benedikt, Munich (group exhibition)
- 2005:
  - "A sophisticated palette", 84 GHz, Munich (single exhibition)
  - "Kunst im Keller", Munich (single exhibition)
  - "2005 Annual Exhibition: Positionen, Kunstverein Traunstein", Kunstverein Traunstein, Traunstein City Gallery at Kunstraum Klosterkirche, Traunstein (group exhibition)
  - 2006: "2006 Annual Exhibition Arbeitskreis 68", City hall & Gallery at Ganserhaus, Wasserburg am Inn (group exhibition)
  - "2006 Annual Exhibition", Kunstverein Traunstein, Traunstein City Gallery at Kunstraum Klosterkirche, Traunstein (group exhibition)
- 2007:
  - "Come on in my kitchen", Galerie Goethe 53, Munich (single exhibition)
  - "Paintings and sculptures", BBH, Munich (single exhibition)
  - "2007 Annual Exhibition", Kunstverein Traunstein, Traunstein City Gallery at Kunstraum Klosterkirche, Traunstein (group exhibition)
- 2008: "2008 Annual Exhibition", Kunstverein Traunstein, Traunstein City Gallery at Kunstraum Klosterkirche, Traunstein (group exhibition)
