= United catholic school in Nitra, Slovakia =

Catholic school in Slovakia

Coordinates: 48°18′N 18°5′E

The complex of United catholic school consists of Secondary school of St. Cyril and Metod, Church of Visiting of virgin Mary and elementary school of St. Svorad and Benedikt. There were two schools which its own administration. But in 2006 Nitra's bishop made decision about linkage of these two schools. In the area of United catholic school is also the Church of the Visitation of the Virgin Mary, which is close to Secondary school of St. Cyril and Metod. The complex is situated in the centre of the town Nitra, in Farska Street.

== Secondary school of St. Cyril and Metod ==
Catholic School, which was established in 1991, currently has more than 600 students attending it in 17 classes. There was modern computer schoolroom with powerful computers, restoring physical and chemical laboratory. The school has its own hostel, where students who live far away can live during the week.

== Church of the Visitation of the Virgin Mary ==
The Church of the Visitation of the Virgin Mary was built in 1854 by bishop Palugyai in neo-Roman style. Reconstruction of it was firstly in 1911 and then in 30s and 40s. Dominant of church is big cross, which was made because of first anniversary of visit of Pope John Paul the Second in Slovakia. There is also a wooden altar with three images which was created by artist Schiler. The building has not been nominated as national monument.

== Elementary school of St. Svorad and Benedikt ==
Catholic elementary school is near Secondary school of St. Cyril and Metod.
