= Andrés de la Calleja =

Spanish artist (1705–1785)

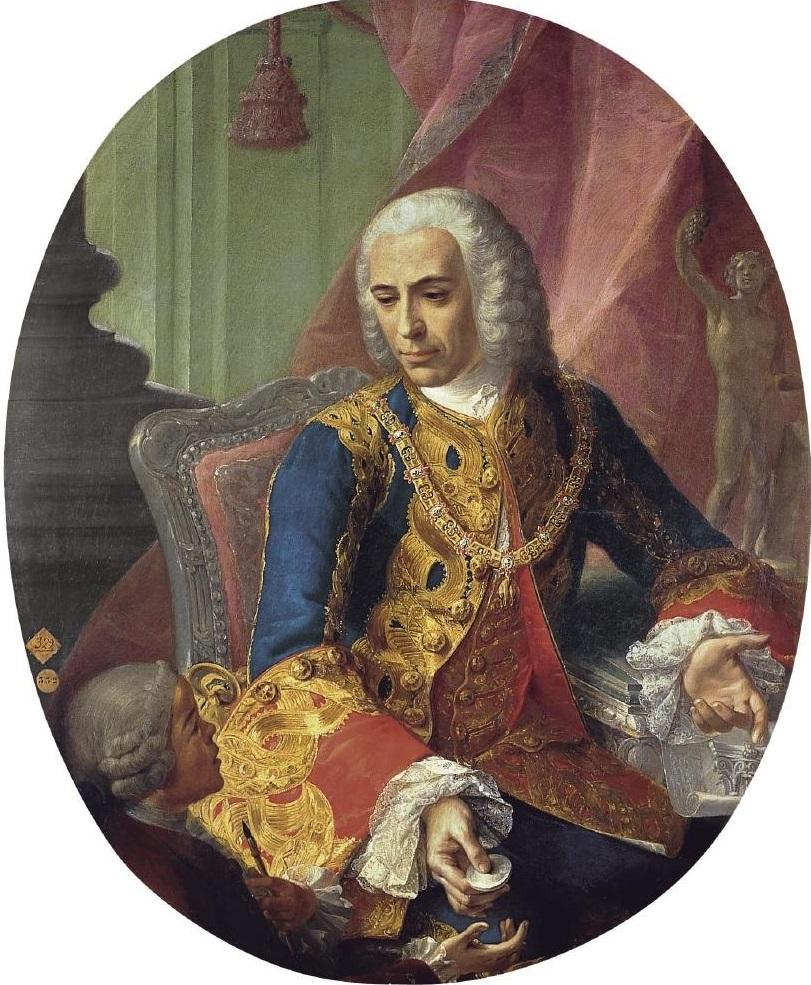
Portrait of José de Carvajal y Lancáster by Andrés de la Calleja, Real Academia de Bellas Artes de San Fernando

Andrés de la Calleja (6 December 1705 – 2 January 1785) was a Spanish painter, born at Rioja. He was a pupil of G. A. Ezquerra, and was so successful in his early efforts that he was soon appointed by King Philip V to a post of honour. Ferdinand VI in 1752 made him the first Director of the newly founded Academy at Madrid, and he established a school of some repute. But we are told that the principal occupation of his latter years was that of restoring the ancient pictures belonging to the king! It would be unjust to visit on him all the iniquities that have been perpetrated on pictures in Spain by the process of restoring; for to such an extent has it been carried, that very few of them, really worth preserving, have escaped. His best works are in the churches of Santa Cruz and of San Felipe el Real at Madrid. He died in that city in 1785.
