= Visitation (Christianity) =

Christian story and feast of Mary visiting Elizabeth

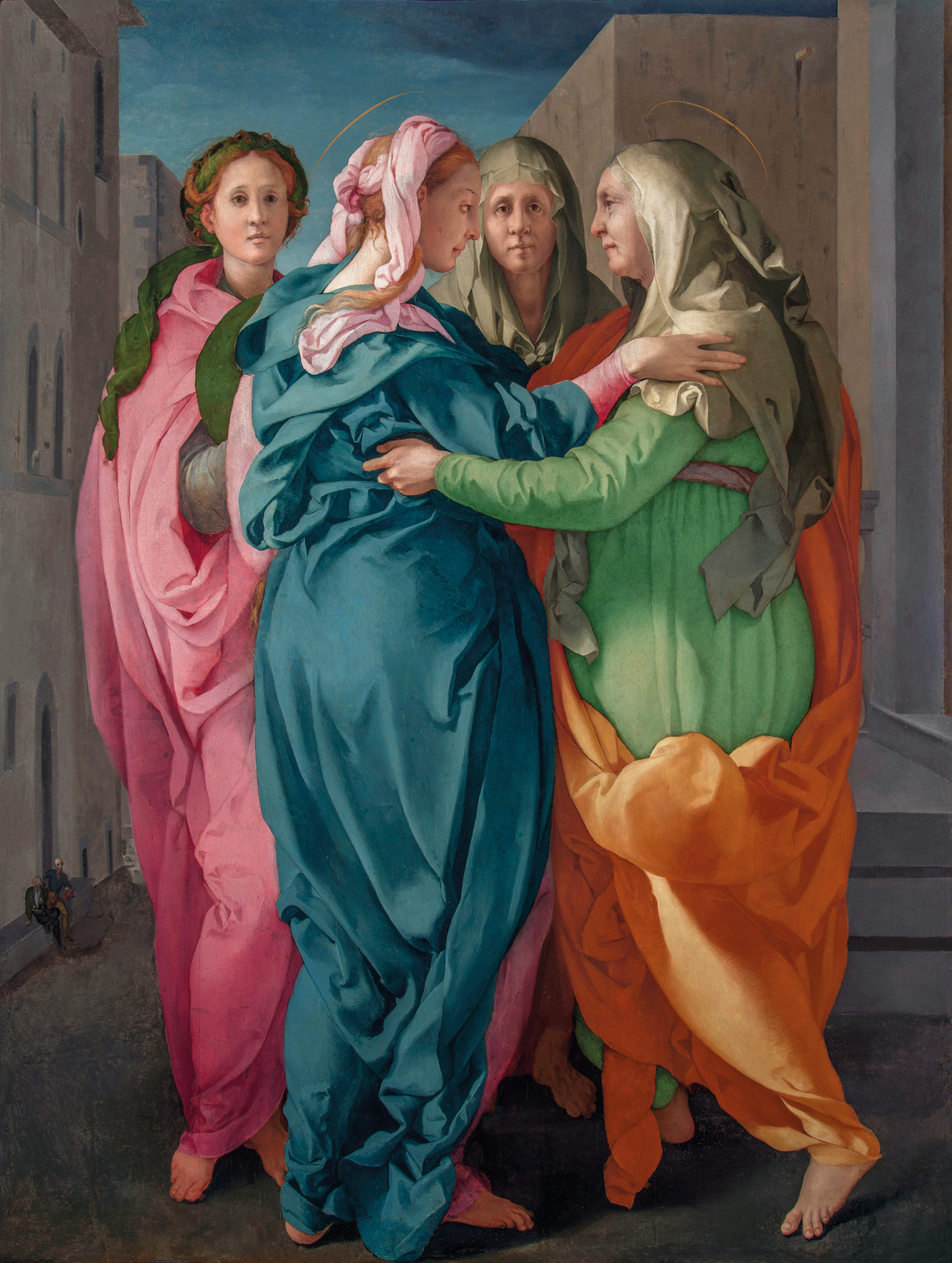
Visitation by Pontormo, 1528, Rectory of Saints Michael and Francis, Carmignano

In Christianity, the Visitation, also known as the Visitation of the Blessed Virgin Mary, refers to the visit of Mary, who was pregnant with Jesus, to Elizabeth, who was pregnant with John the Baptist, in the Gospel of Luke, Luke 1:39–56. The episode is one of the standard scenes shown in cycles of the Life of the Virgin in art, and sometimes in larger cycles of the Life of Christ in art.

It is also the name of a Christian feast day commemorating this visit, traditionally celebrated on July 2 in Western Christianity and March 30 in Eastern Christianity. In the revised calendars of some churches in the West, it is now often celebrated on May 31 instead.

== Biblical narrative ==
Traditional Visitation journey from Nazareth to the hill country of Judea

The Gospel of Luke gives the only Biblical account of the Visitation:

And Mary arose in those days, and went into the hill country with haste, into a city of Juda; and entered into the house of Zacharias, and saluted Elisabeth. And it came to pass, that, when Elisabeth heard the salutation of Mary, the babe leaped in her womb; and Elisabeth was filled with the Holy Ghost: and she spake out with a loud voice, and said, Blessed art thou among women, and blessed is the fruit of thy womb. And whence is this to me, that the mother of my Lord should come to me? For, lo, as soon as the voice of thy salutation sounded in mine ears, the babe leaped in my womb for joy. And blessed is she that believed: for there shall be a performance of those things which were told her from the Lord.

— Luke 1:39–45, KJV

In the story, Mary visited her cousin Elizabeth, the wife of Zechariah. They are both pregnant, Mary with Jesus and Elizabeth about six months' pregnant with John the Baptist (Luke 1:36). Mary left Nazareth immediately after the Annunciation and went "into the hill country ... into a city of Judah" (Luke 1:39) to attend to her cousin (Luke 1:36) Elizabeth. There are several possibilities as to exactly which city this was, including Hebron, south of Jerusalem, and Ein Karem. The journey from Nazareth to Hebron is about 130 kilometres (81 mi) in a direct line, probably up to half as far again by road, depending on the route taken.

Upon hearing Mary's greeting to Elizabeth, Elizabeth exclaims, beginning, "Blessed art thou among women, and blessed is the fruit of thy womb" (Luke 1:42), echoing and expanding upon the greeting given by the archangel Gabriel at the Annunciation (Luke 1:28). This exclamation forms the second part of the Hail Mary. In response to Elizabeth, Mary proclaims the Magnificat, also known as the Song of Mary.

Mary stayed three months with Elizabeth (Luke 1:56), and most scholars hold she stayed for the birth of John. Given the prevailing cultural traditions and needs for security, it is probable that Joseph accompanied Mary to Judah then returned to Nazareth, and came again after three months to take his wife home. The apparition of the angel, mentioned in Matthew 1:19–25, may have taken place then to end the tormenting doubts of Joseph regarding Mary's maternity.

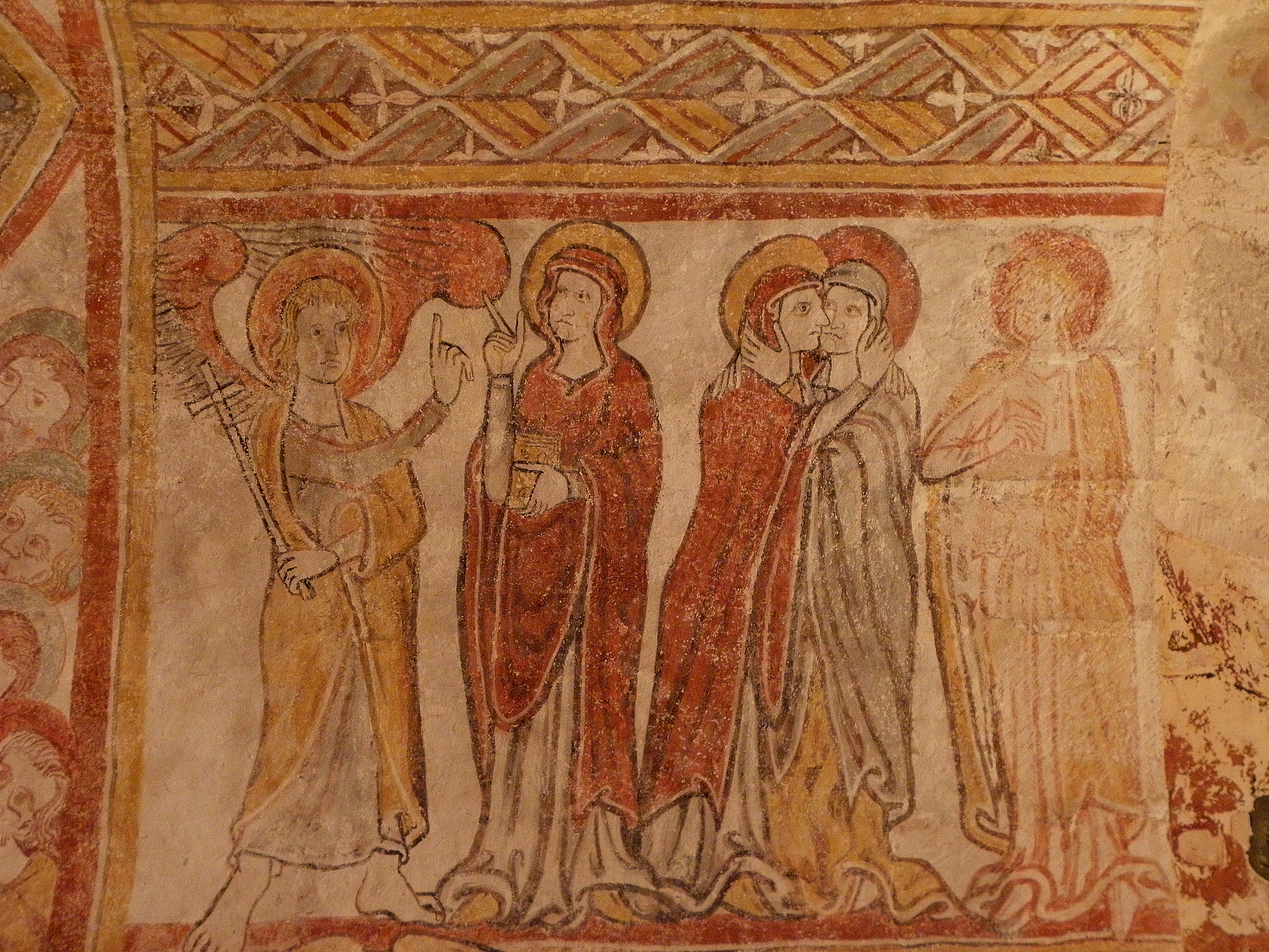
Fresco of the Annunciation and Visitation, 13th ct., crypt of Saint-Laurent-et-Notre-Dame, Gargilesse-Dampierre

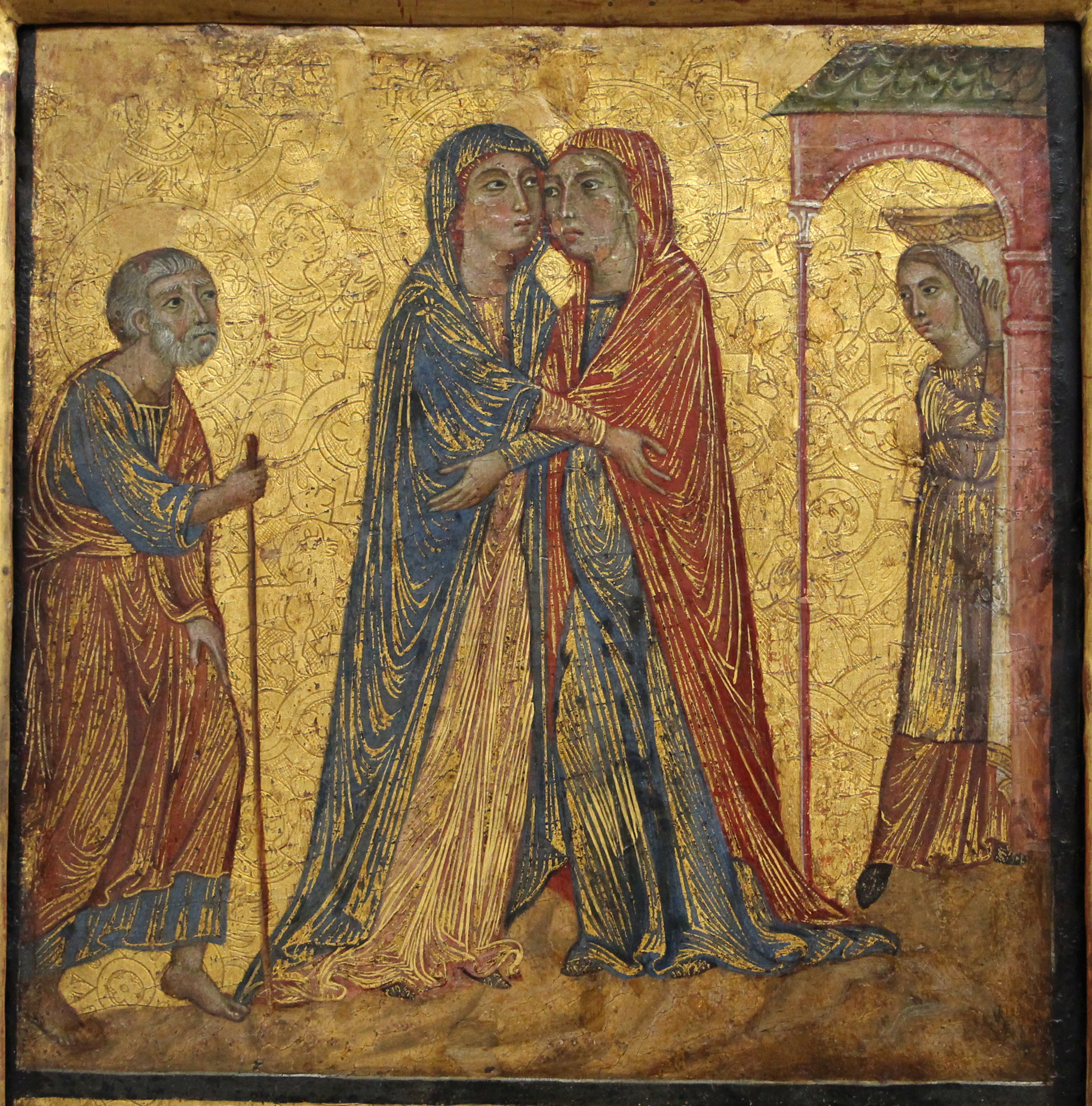
Deodato Orlandi, 1300–10, scene from the Life of John the Baptist (Gemäldegalerie, Berlin)

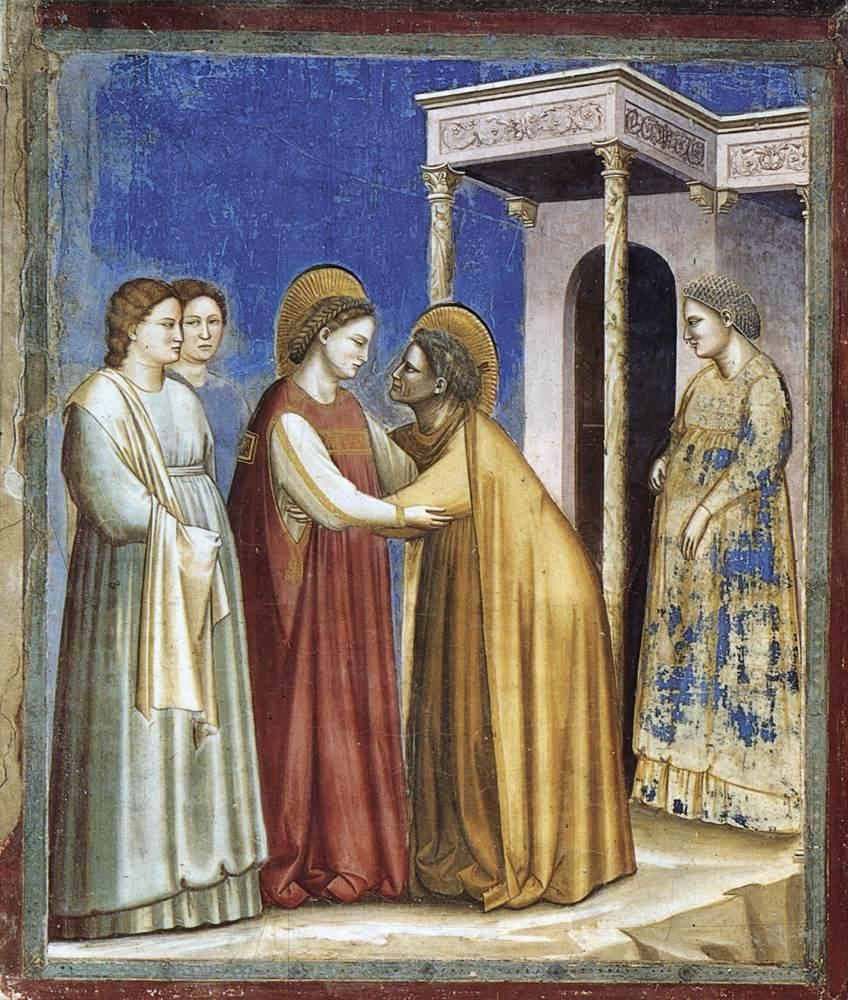
Giotto, 1306, fresco from the Life of the Virgin, Scrovegni Chapel, Padua

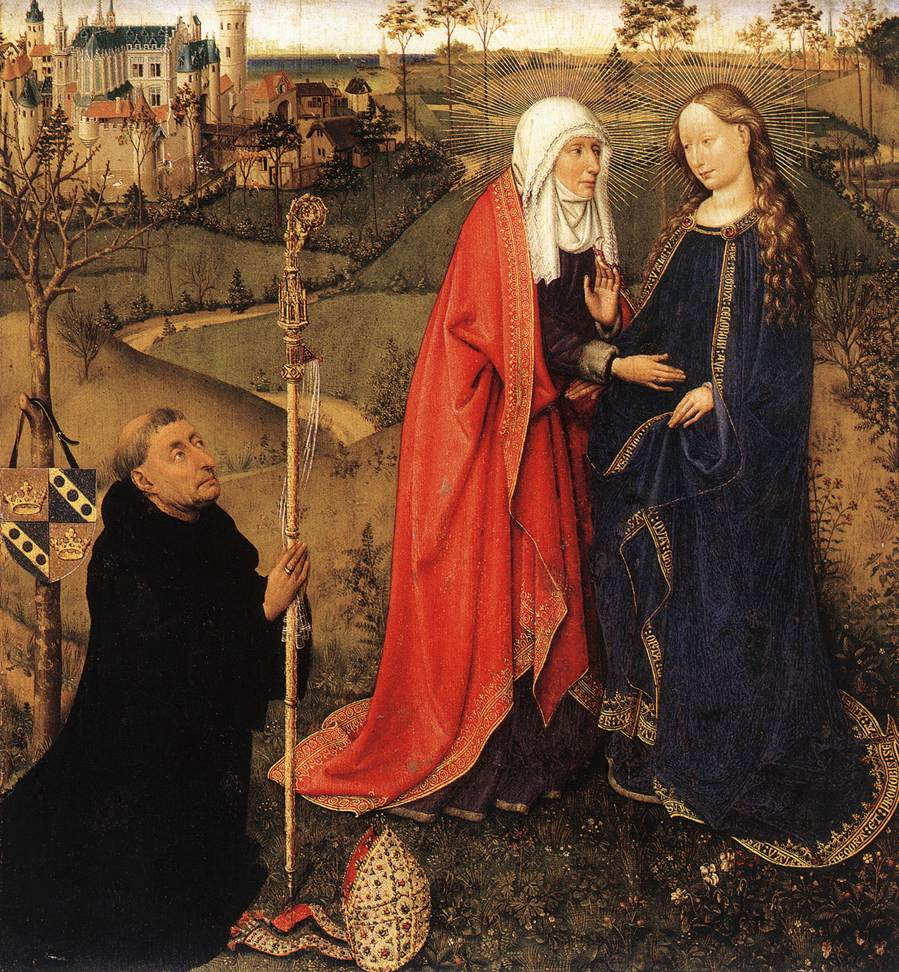
"Visitation" with donor portrait, from St Vaast Altarpiece by Jacques Daret, c. 1435 (Gemäldegalerie, Berlin)

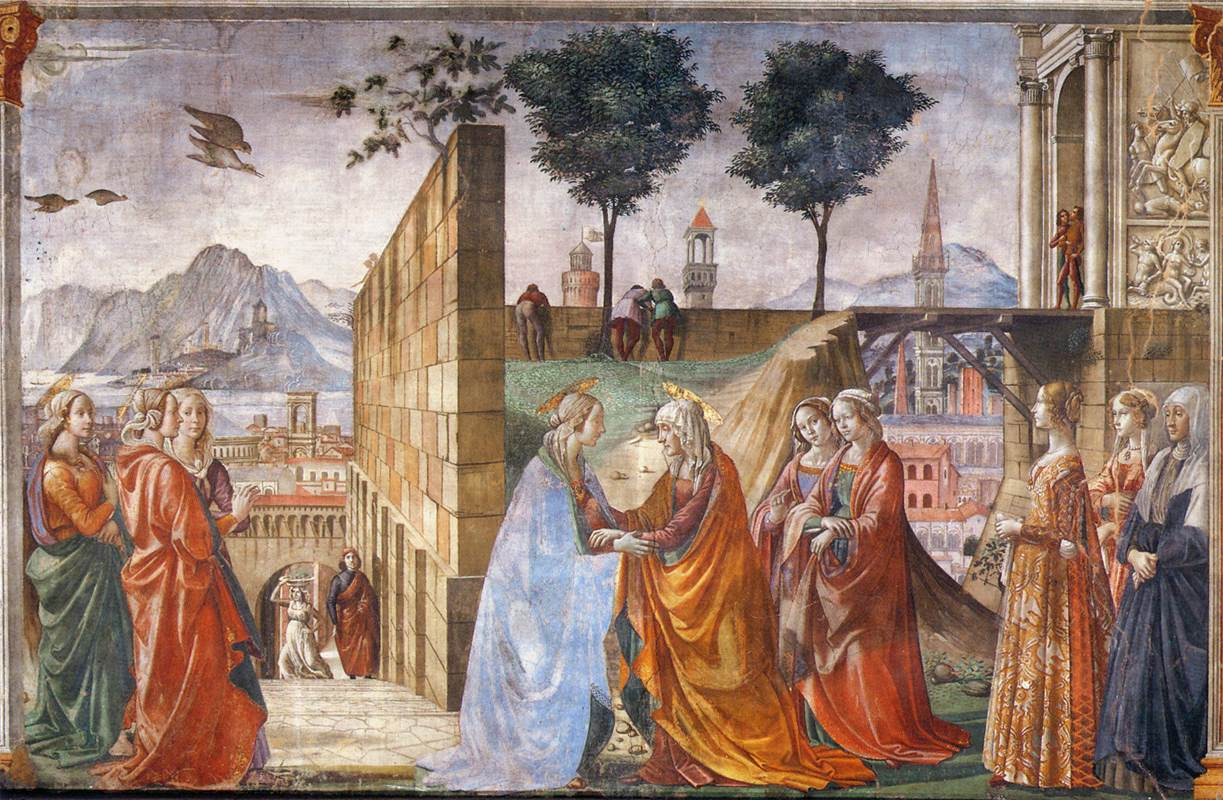
From a Renaissance fresco cycle by Domenico Ghirlandaio, 1486–1490, Tornabuoni Chapel, Santa Maria Novella, Florence

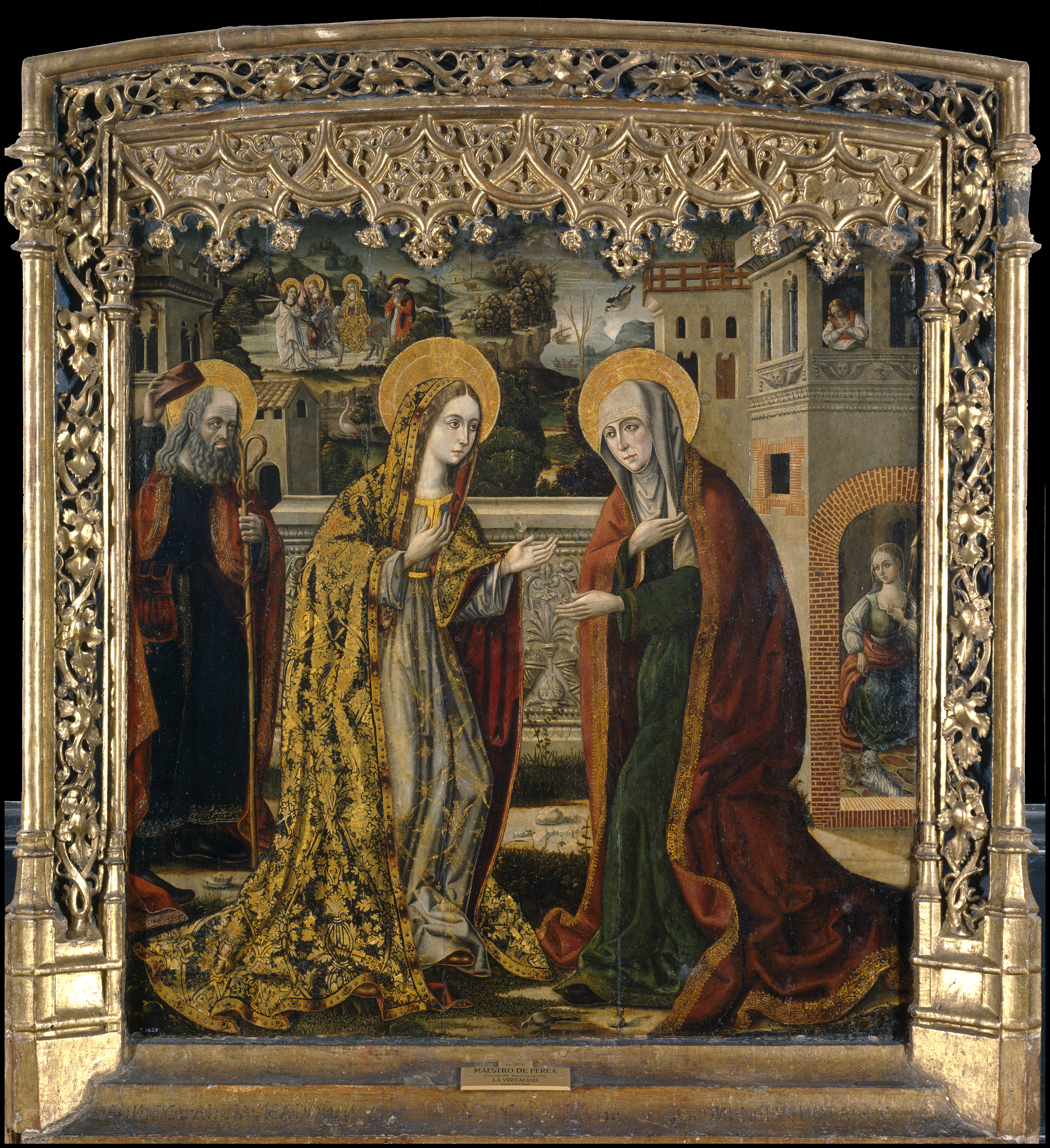
Maestro de Perea, 1500, Prado, Madrid

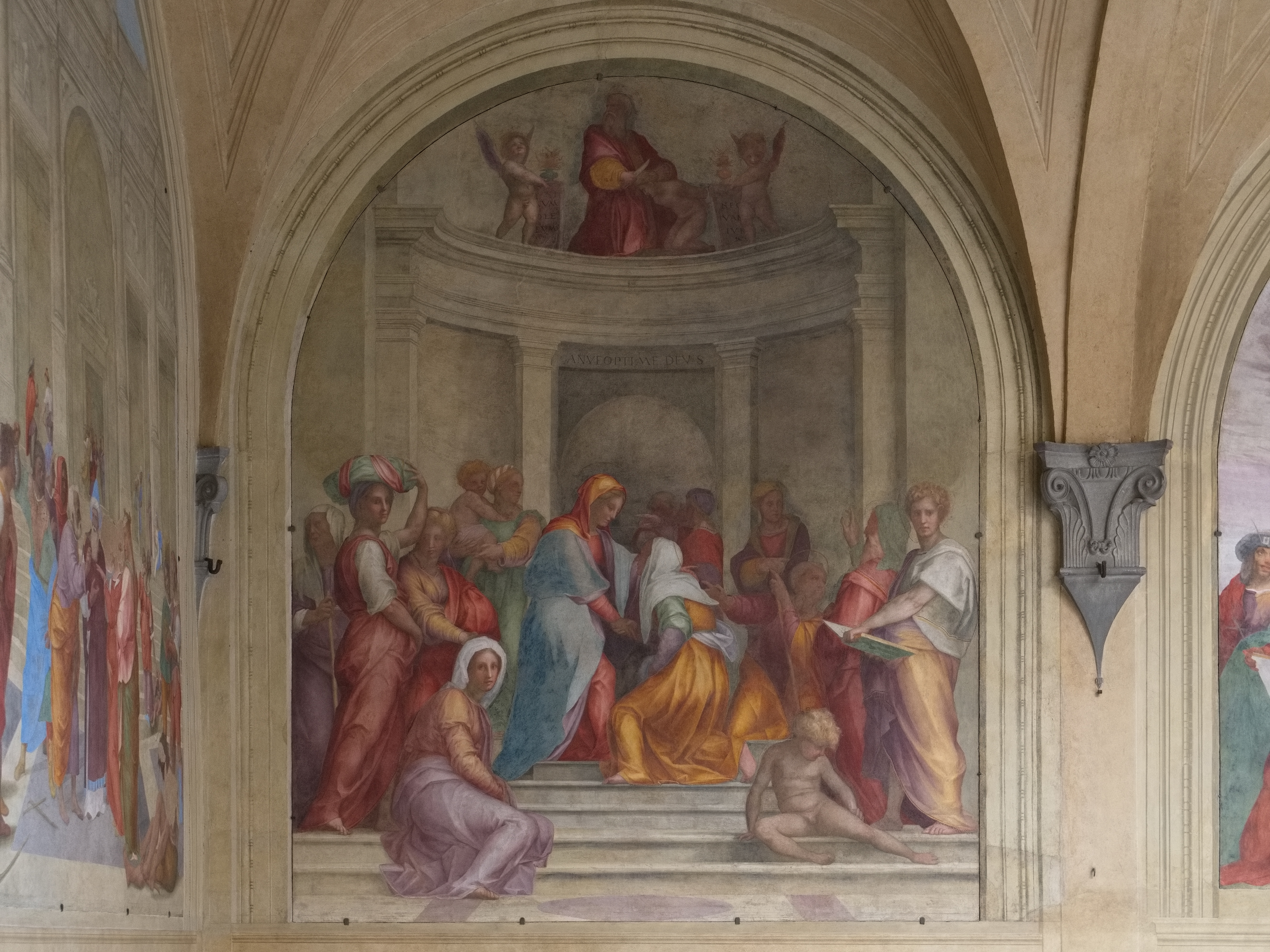
Pontormo, 1516, Chiostrino dei Voti, SS Annunziata, Florence

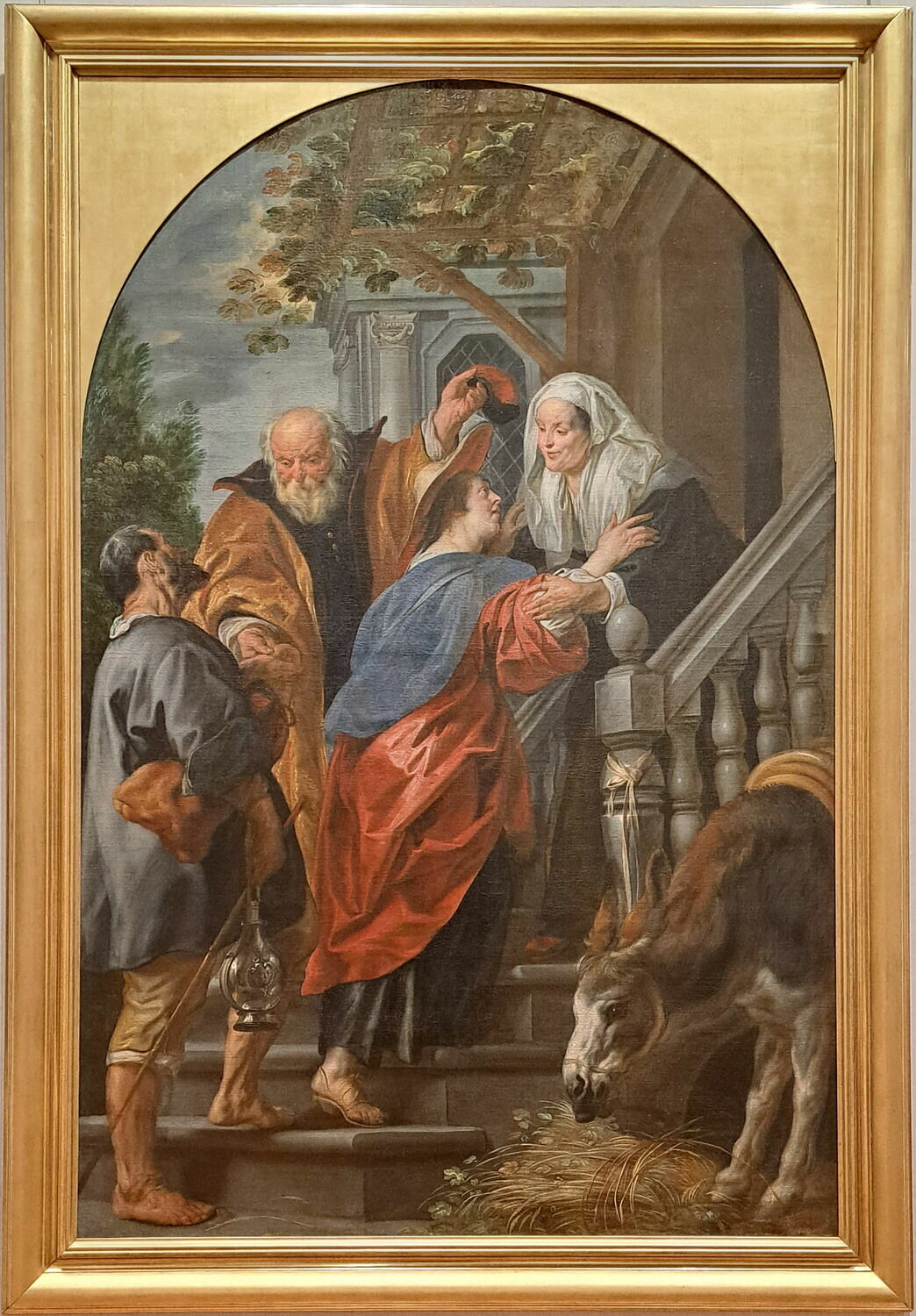
Jacob Jordaens, 1641–42, Museum of Fine Arts of Lyon

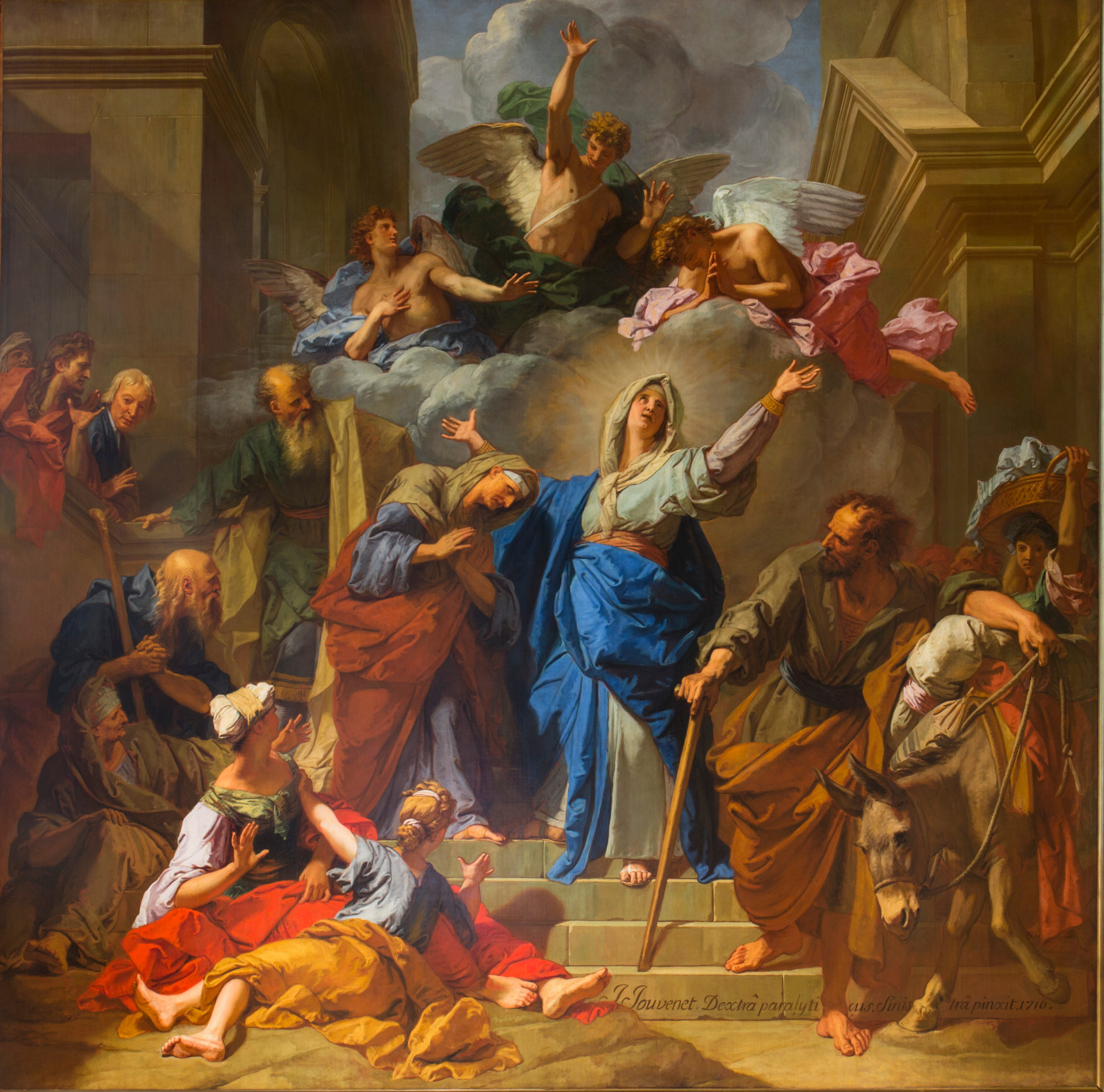
Jean Jouvenet, La visitation de la Vierge (Le Magnificat), 1716, Louvre, Paris

== Feast ==
Feast of the Visitation
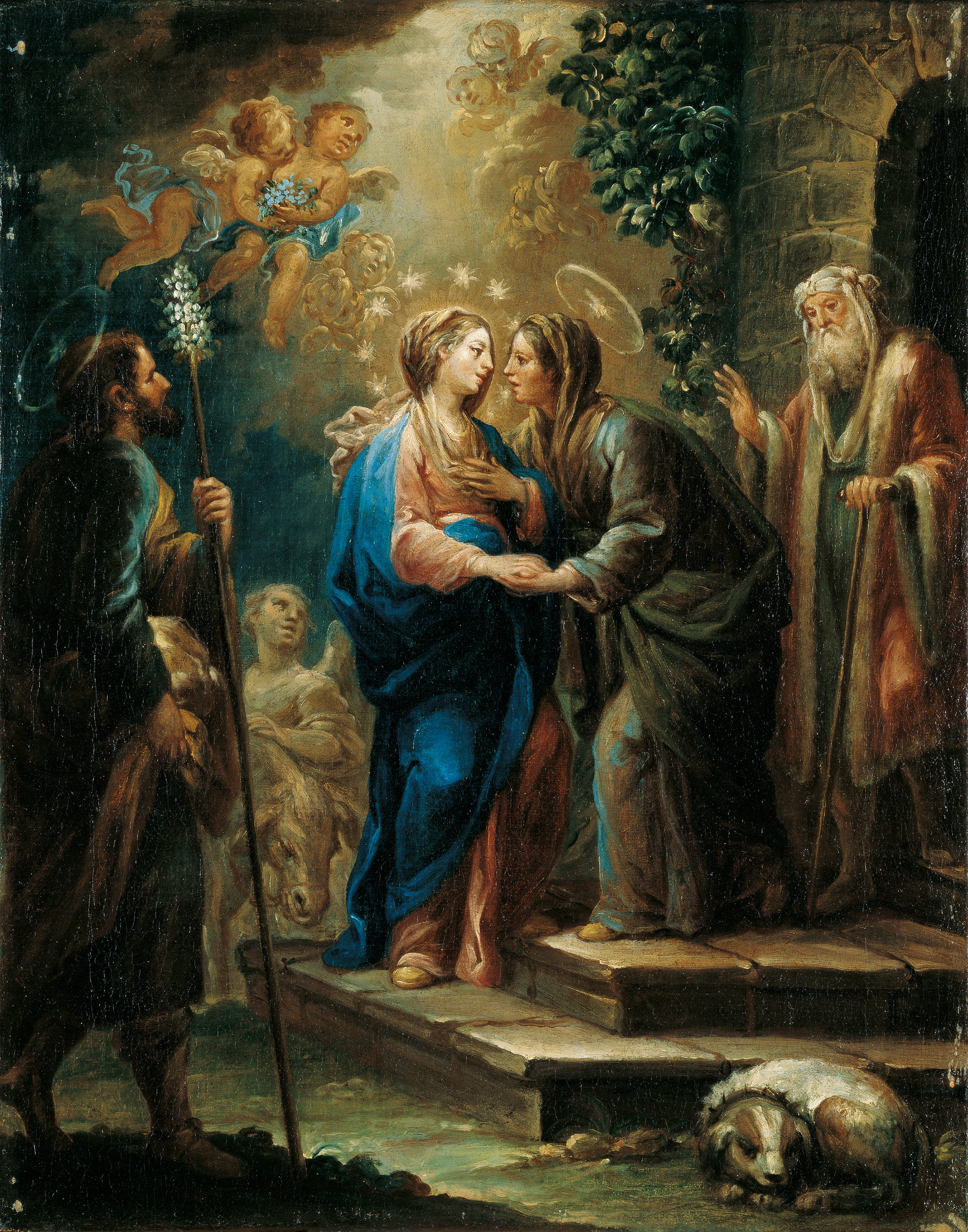
- Painting by Jerónimo Ezquerra, circa 1730s
- Observed by: Liturgical churches
- Type: Christian
- Date: May 31 (General Roman Calendar); July 2 (Anglican, Germany, Slovakia); March 30 (Eastern Orthodox); Third Sunday in the Season of Annunciation (Syriac)
- Frequency: Annual
- Related to: Feast of the Annunciation, Nativity of John the Baptist

=== Western Christianity ===
The feast of the Visitation of the Blessed Virgin Mary is of medieval origin. In 1389 Pope Urban VI, hoping thereby to obtain an end to the Great Western Schism, inserted it at the urging of John of Jenstein, Archbishop of Prague, in the Roman Calendar, for celebration on July 2. In the Tridentine calendar, it was a Double. When that Missal of Pope Pius V was replaced by that of Pope Clement VIII in 1604, the Visitation became a Double of the Second Class, or, as it would be called from 1960 by Pope John XXIII's reform, a Second-Class Feast. It continued to be assigned to July 2, the day after the end of the octave following the birthday of John the Baptist, who was still in his mother's womb at the time of the Visitation. In addition to July 2, the Visitation was also traditionally marked on Ember Friday in Advent, providing the Gospel reading for that day.

The 1969 revision of the Roman calendar moved it to May 31, between the "Annunciation of the Lord (25 March) and that of the Nativity of St. John the Baptist (24 June), so that it would harmonize better with the Gospel story." The Visitation is also the second Joyful Mystery of the Rosary.

In the calendar of the Anglican 1662 Book of Common Prayer, the Visitation of the Blessed Virgin Mary is a black-letter day marked on July 2, although many modern Anglican calendars now celebrate the Visitation on May 31 in line with the changes made to the Roman calendar. The Catholic and Lutheran churches of Germany have also retained the date of July 2. Similarly, the Catholic Church in Slovakia has also retained July 2 because of an important national pilgrimage to the Basilica of the Visitation in the town of Levoča that has been held in the first weekend of July since the 13th century. Traditionalist Catholics, who use a pre-1970 calendar, also observe July 2.

=== Eastern Christianity ===
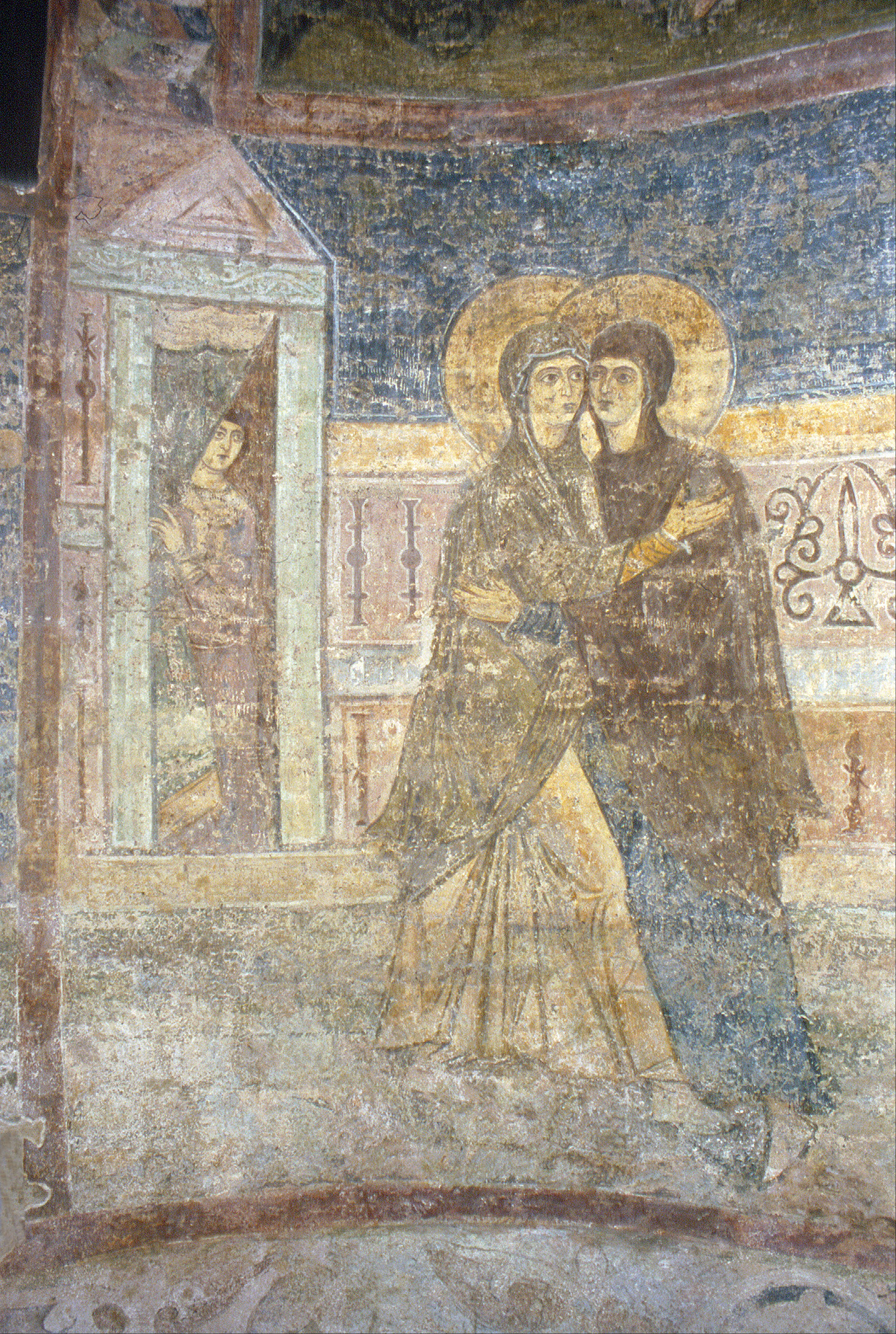
Eastern Christian fresco of the Visitation, c. 1000, St Sophia Cathedral, Kyiv, Ukraine

The celebration of a feast day commemorating this event in the Eastern Orthodox Church is of relatively recent origin, dating only to the 19th century. The impetus to establish a feast day in the Eastern Orthodox liturgical calendar, and the composition of a service to be included in the Menaion, were the work of Archimandrite Antonin Kapustin (1817–1894), head of the Russian Orthodox Ecclesiastical Mission in Jerusalem. The Gorny Convent in Ein Karem, built on the traditional site of the Visitation, celebrates this feast on 30 March. If 30 March falls between Lazarus Saturday and Pascha / Easter, the Visitation Feast is transferred to Bright Friday. Celebration of the Feast of the Visitation has not yet been accepted by all Orthodox jurisdictions.

In Syriac Christianity the feast of the Visitation is celebrated on the third Sunday in the Season of Annunciation prior to Christmas.

== Commentary ==
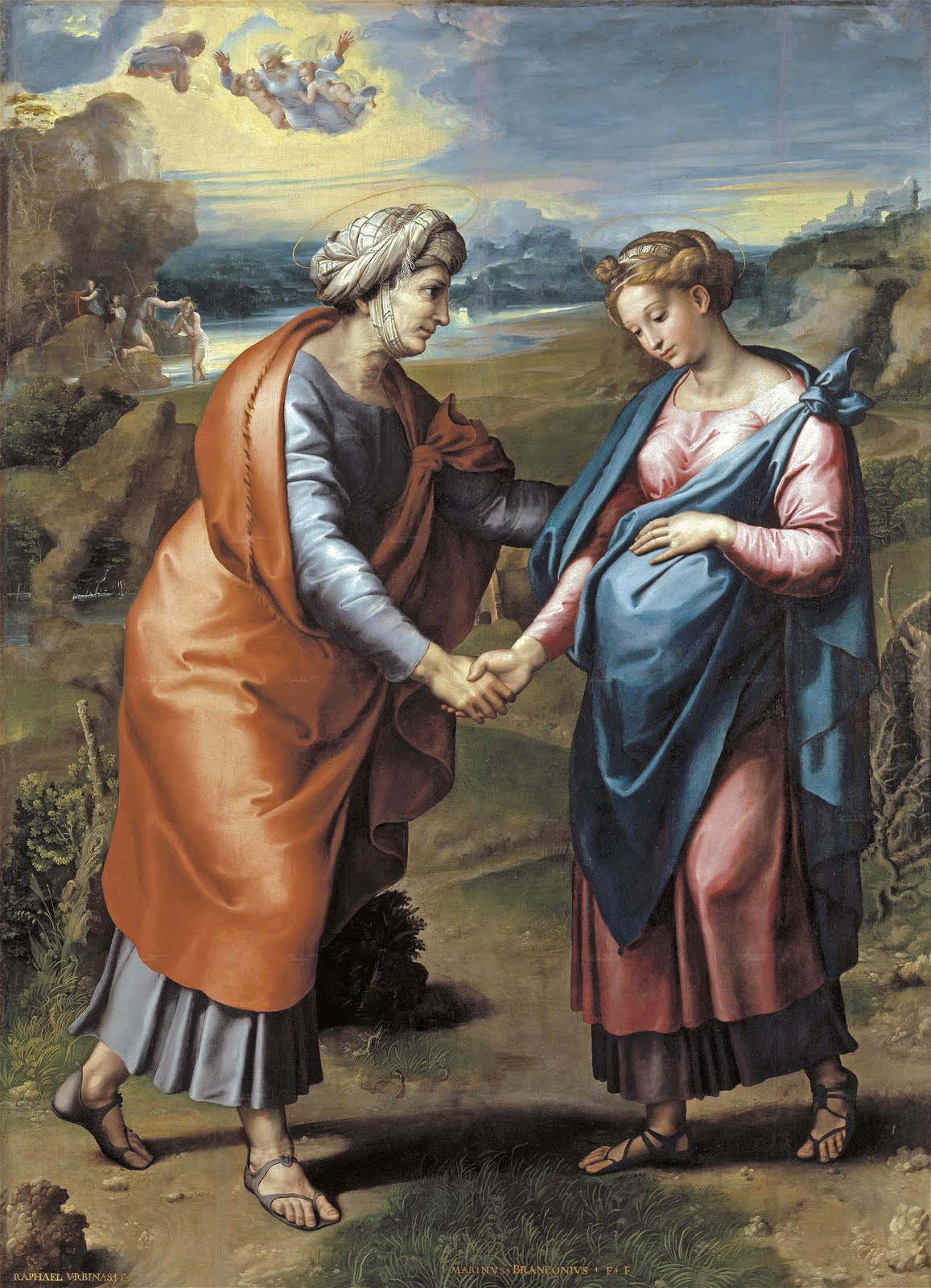
Visitation by Raphael, c. 1517

The visitation of Mary to Elizabeth in Luke 1:39–56 is seen by many as a rich source of commentary on the role of Mary in the Christian Church. Pointing to the veneration of the Mother of God in the Catholic Church, German theologian Justus Knecht (1839–1921), writes that:

In the Magnificat Mary said prophetically: "From henceforth all generations shall call me blessed." This prophecy has been fulfilled in the Catholic Church, for our holy Church honours our Lady by special feasts and special devotions. How would it be possible not to pay honour to her whom God raised to such a high dignity, and praised in such a manner by the mouths of Gabriel and Elizabeth! Our veneration of the holy Mother of God is well founded both on Holy Scripture and on reason.

Knecht also notes that Mary gives us a "pattern of charity", writing:

Why did Mary hasten to visit her cousin? ... Firstly, the angel had referred her to Elizabeth, although she had believed his words without asking for a sign. She therefore believed it to be God’s will that she should visit her cousin, and convince herself of the truth of the sign given her, i. e. that Elizabeth was about to have a son. Secondly, Mary knew well that her cousin had grieved for many years on account of being childless, and she knew how happy she must be now that the cause of her grief was removed. Mary’s loving heart sympathised with the happiness of her cousin; she desired to wish her joy, rejoice with her, and join her in praising God’s mercy. He who really loves his neighbour has a loving sympathy with his joys and sorrows. Thirdly, Mary, as the holy Fathers teach, wished to minister to her cousin, and help her in her household affairs.

Some Catholic commentators have maintained that the purpose of this visit was to bring divine grace to both Elizabeth and her unborn child. Even though he was still in his mother's womb, John became aware of the presence of Christ, and leapt for joy as he was cleansed from original sin and filled with divine grace. Elizabeth also responded and recognised the presence of Jesus, and thus Mary exercised her function as mediatrix between God and man for the first time.

In Roger Baxter's Meditations For Every Day In The Year, he compares the visitation to the Ark of the Covenant, writing the following:

Consider the inspired words of Scripture: "The ark of the Lord abode in the house of Obededom, the Gethite, three months; and the Lord blessed Obededom and all his household." (2 Samuel vi. 11.) [sic] How much more may we suppose did He bless the house of Zachary, in which the living ark of the Lord and the mother of God dwelt so long.

The word "blessed" in Elizabeth's exclamation is rendered in Greek not by the word "makarios" but as "evlogimeni", which is the feminine second person singular, used only this once in the New Testament. Its masculine third person singular counterpart "evlogimenos" is used only for Jesus and only on this occasion and when he was welcomed into Jerusalem on Palm Sunday with "Blessed is he who comes in the name of the Lord".

== See also ==
- Churches of the Visitation
- Order of the Visitation of Holy Mary

Visitation (Christianity) Life of Jesus
Preceded by The Annunciation	New Testament; Events	Succeeded by The Nativity
