= St. Elizabeth Church (Manhattan) =

Catholic church in New York City

Coordinates: 40°51′12.64″N 73°55′57.72″W

Church of St. Elizabeth
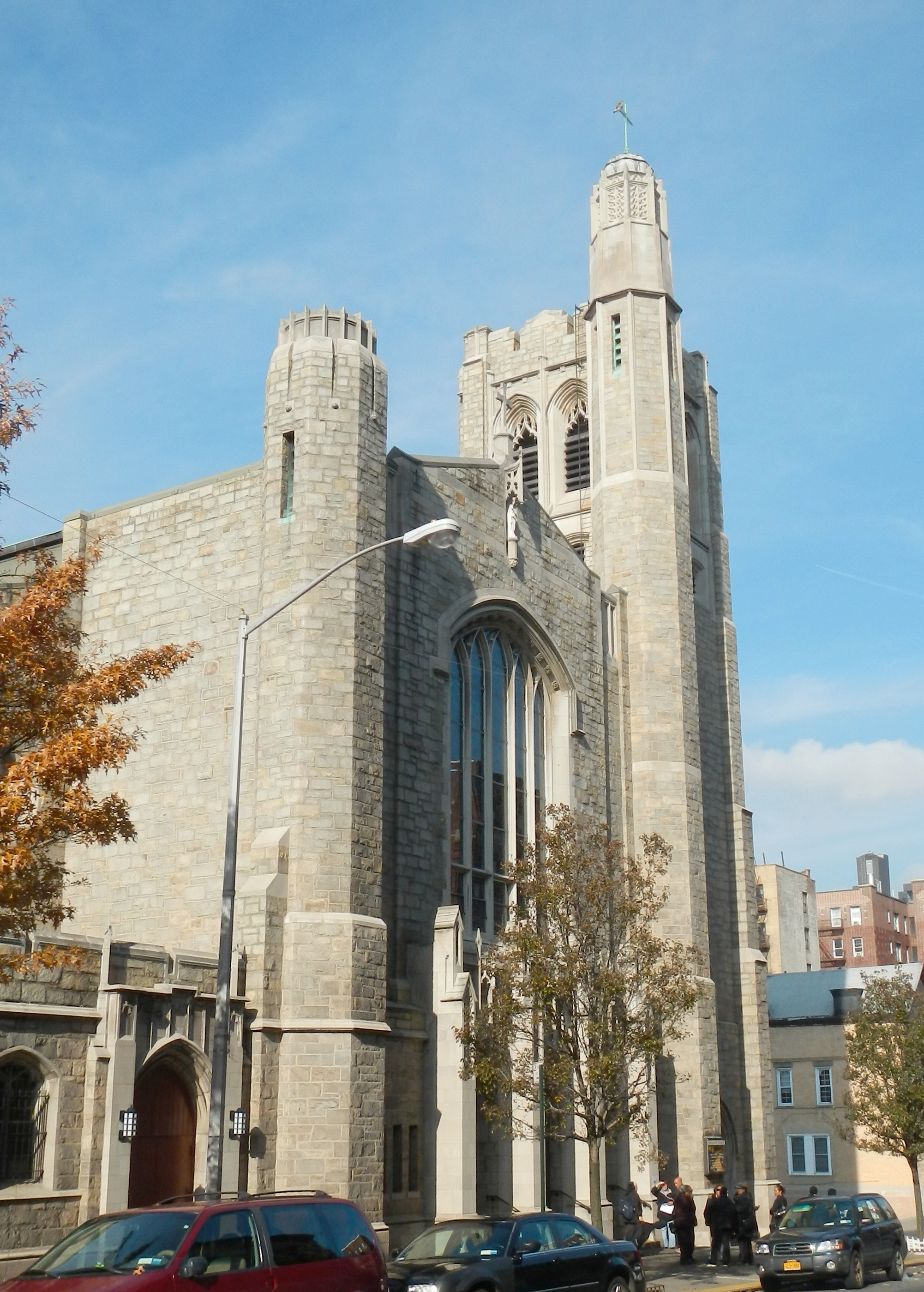
- Interactive map of the Church of St. Elizabeth area

General information
- Architectural style: Gothic Revival
- Location: New York City, United States
- Completed: 1913 (rectory); 1929 (for present church)
- Client: Roman Catholic Archdiocese of New York

Technical details
- Structural system: Masonry stone

Design and construction
- Architect: Edward Lee Young of 12 East 30th Street

Website
- St. Elizabeth's Catholic Church, Manhattan

Church of St. Elizabeth is a Roman Catholic parish church in the Roman Catholic Archdiocese of New York, located at West 187th Street at Wadsworth Avenue in Washington Heights, Manhattan, New York City. The parish was established in 1869, originally located on 187th Street at Broadway from 1869 to 1929.

The parish was founded in 1869 in what was then known as Fort Washington by the Rev. Cornelius O’Callaghan. The parish's founding meant that it took on as an out-mission St. John's in the Bronx, which was then being administered to by the Jesuits of Fordham University. St. John's broke off as its own parish in 1877. The original address, as listed in 1892, was at King's Bridge Road, near 187th Street.

== Buildings ==
The present Neo-Gothic stone church was begun in 1927 with designs by architect Robert J. Reiley. A three-storey brick and stone rectory on West 187th Street was built in 1913 for $20,000 to designs by architect Edward Lee Young of 12 East 30th Street.
