= St. John's Church (Bronx) =

Catholic parish church in New York, US

Coordinates: 40°52′45″N 73°54′27″W

The Church of St. John
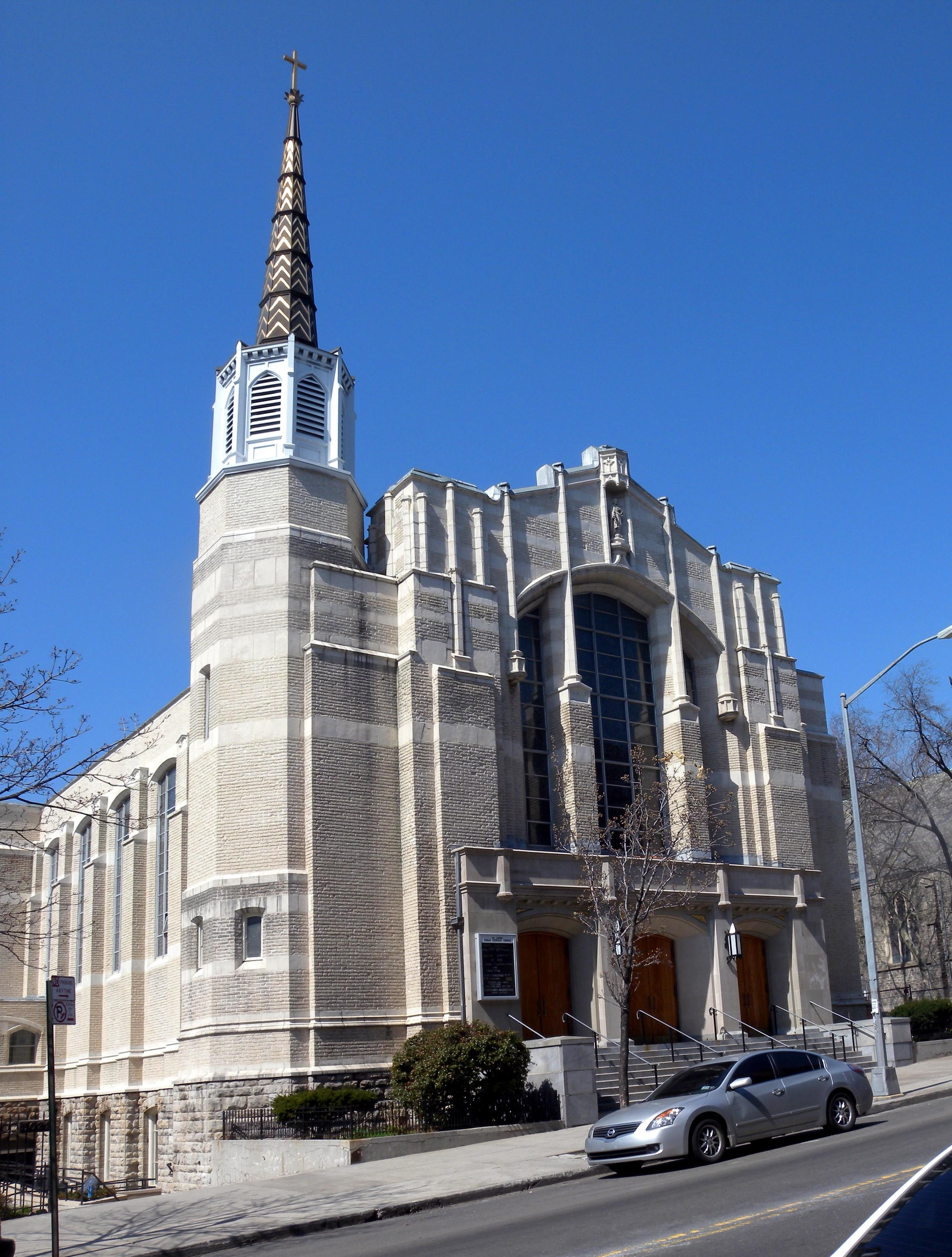
- Interactive map of the The Church of St. John area

General information
- Architectural style: Tudor Revival
- Location: Kingsbridge, Bronx, New York City, United States
- Construction started: 1877 (for first church); 1893 (for present church basement)
- Completed: 1877 (for first church); 1904 (for present church)
- Demolished: 1893 (for removal of first church)
- Cost: $21,000 (for 1893 basement)
- Client: Roman Catholic Archdiocese of New York

Technical details
- Structural system: Timber-frame (for 1877 church/hall); Masonry (for 1904 church)

Design and construction
- Architect: Davis, McGrath & Kiessling

The Church of St. John is a parish church under the authority of the Roman Catholic Archdiocese of New York, located at 3021 Kingsbridge Avenue, Bronx, New York City. Property was purchased in 1870 and construction of a wood-framed church was begun, this was the first Catholic church in Kingsbridge, Bronx.

The parish has had long ties with the Religious of Jesus and Mary as their main base in New York City.

On November 2, 2014, the parish was merged with that of the Church of the Visitation.

== Parish history ==
The current parish community of St. John-Visitation has its roots in the Kingsbridge neighborhood in the 1860s. The Kingsbridge neighborhood was originally part of the City of Yonkers; Catholics in the area were served by priests from St. Mary's Church, and later also the Jesuits of Fordham University (founded as St. John's College). Mass was originally celebrated in an old schoolhouse on Spuyten Duyvil Hill. Kingsbridge was annexed by the City of New York on January 1, 1874.

Upon the 1869 founding of St. Elizabeth Parish in Fort Washington by the Rev. Cornelius O’Callaghan, St. John's became a mission of the Fort Washington parish.

In 1886, Archbishop Corigan established St. John's as a parish with Rev. Edward O’Gorman as the first resident pastor. A St. John's Church was listed at 2911 Church Street, in 1892. In 1914, it was recorded, that the "Rev. Francis Xavier Kelly, successor to Farther O’Dwyer, is assisted by the Rev. Joseph MacCarthy."

A Mass in Spanish was inaugurated in 1971.

In 1994, the Order of Augustinian Recollects was entrusted with the administration of the parish.

On August 1, 2015, St. John's Parish and Visitation Parish formally merged. Fr. Michael Kerrigan, a priest of the archdiocese, was appointed the first pastor of the merged parish.

== Buildings ==
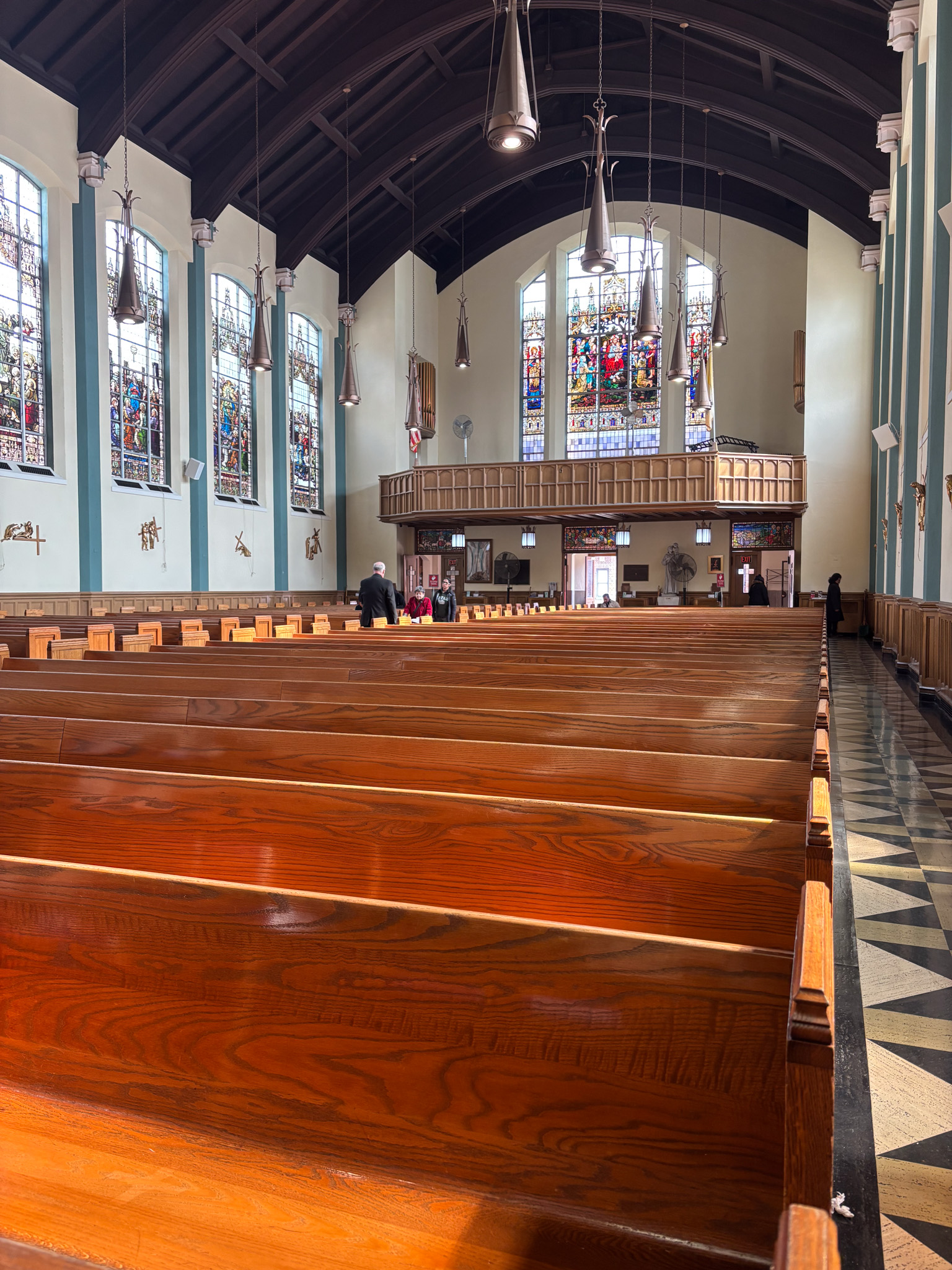
Interior of St. John's Church, March 2026

In 1870, Rev. Henry A. Brann was appointed to take charge of the mission. During his 16-year pastorate, he purchased land and built a small timber-framed church, which was dedicated by John Cardinal McCloskey on December 4, 1877. The Rev. Edward O’Gorman was appointed the first resident pastor where he remained for 18 years and during that time greatly increased the church's property holdings. Rev. O’Gorman “removed” the 1877 church in 1893 and there built half of the present church's basement at a cost of $21,000. The following pastor, the Rev. Daniel H. O’Dwyer, converted the old church in a well-equipped hall. Rev. O’Dwyer erected the present church which was designed by Davis, McGrath & Kiessling. "It is built after the Tudor style, and has a beautiful painting, a copy of Brumidi's 'Crucifixion,' above the altar. The basement contains a chapel, hall, theater, club-rooms, and gymnasium."

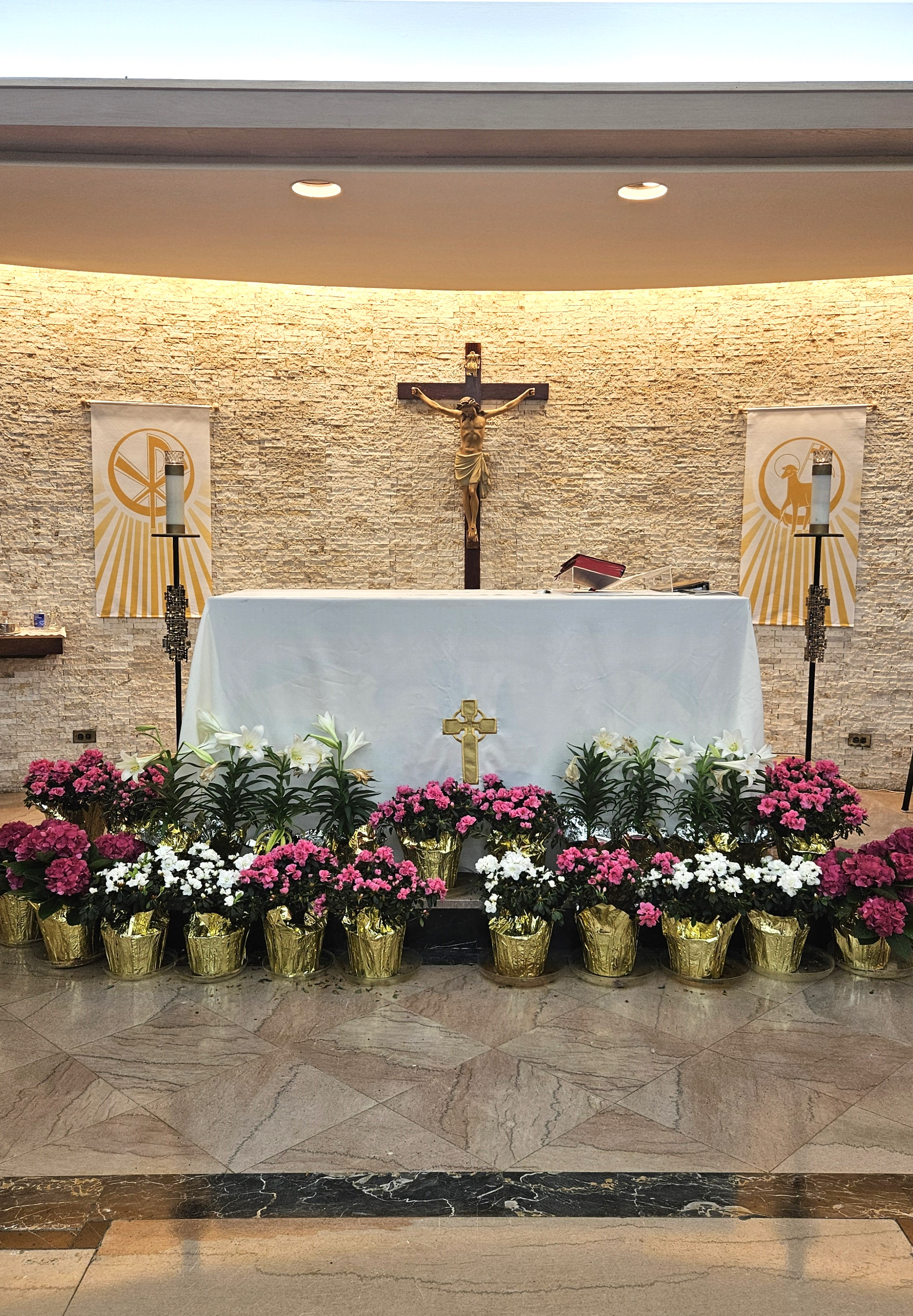
Altar in the basement chapel of St. John - Visitation Parish

== Pastors ==
- Rev. Cornelius O’Callaghan (-1870)
- Rev. Henry A. Brann (1870–1886)
- Rev. Edward O’Gorman (1886–1904)
- Rev. Daniel H. O’Dwyer (1904–1909)
- Rev. Francis Xavier Kelly (1909–1935)
- Rev. Martin A. Scanlan (1935–1963)
- Rev. Louis A. Stryker (1963–1971)
- Rev. John T. Doherty (1971–1982)
- Rev. John F. Lacey (1982–1984)
- Rev. William J. Foley (1984–1994)
- Rev. Edward Fagan, OAR (1994–2000)
- Rev. Gerry Cosgayon, OAR (2000–2003)
- Rev. Edward Fagan, OAR (2003–2009)
- Rev. Antonio 'Joy' Zabala, OAR (2009–2015)
- Rev. Michael Kerrigan (2015–present)

== The Religious of Jesus and Mary at Kingsbridge ==
“The Convent of Jesus and Mary in Kingsbridge was founded in 1903, and is within the parish limits.” Mother St. Cyril of the RJM Province of Canada had dreamed of establishing a community of sisters in New York City, she received permission to send sisters from Archbishop Corrigan in 1890. When Mother St. Cyril was elected the general superior of the order, she entrusted establishing an RJM mission in New York to Mother Euphemia of Canada. Several Religious of Jesus and Mary had left the mother-house in Rome in 1902 to establish the congregation in New York City. The first ministry of the RJM in New York City was a free school for Spanish immigrants and to support their work, the sisters gave French, music, and art lessons and took in borders at their house on West 14th Street. That first ministry developed into the School of Loretto which was eventually transferred to Mother Cabrini's sisters. Mother Euphemia's work also led to the establishment of Our Lady of Peace, a residence for young women.

In August 1903, Mother Euphemia and Mother St. Ferdinand purchased property from the Murray sisters which developed into over a century of service in Kingsbridge. On September 13, Fr. O'Dwyer, the pastor, introduced the RJM to the parishioners and announced they would open a school the following day.

The new school was the Academy of Jesus and Mary at the southwest corner of 232nd Street and Kingsbridge Ave. Land was purchased for a school building in 1922 and over the years various school buildings and convents were built and/or utilized throughout the neighborhood. The Religious of Jesus and Mary grew the school and eventually it became known as St. John's Kingsbridge. At its largest point. the school utilized two buildings, on Godwin Terrace and Kingsbridge Ave. The school was closed at the end of the 2019–2020 school year due to financial and enrollment challenges exacerbated by the COVID-19 Pandemic. More than 200 RJM sisters dedicated countless years of educational service to thousands of local Catholic boys and girls. Many young women who attended St. John's School went on to join the Religious of Jesus and Mary. Notable educators among the sisters were Mother Mary Catherine (Kenny), Mother Camillus, and Mother Regis.

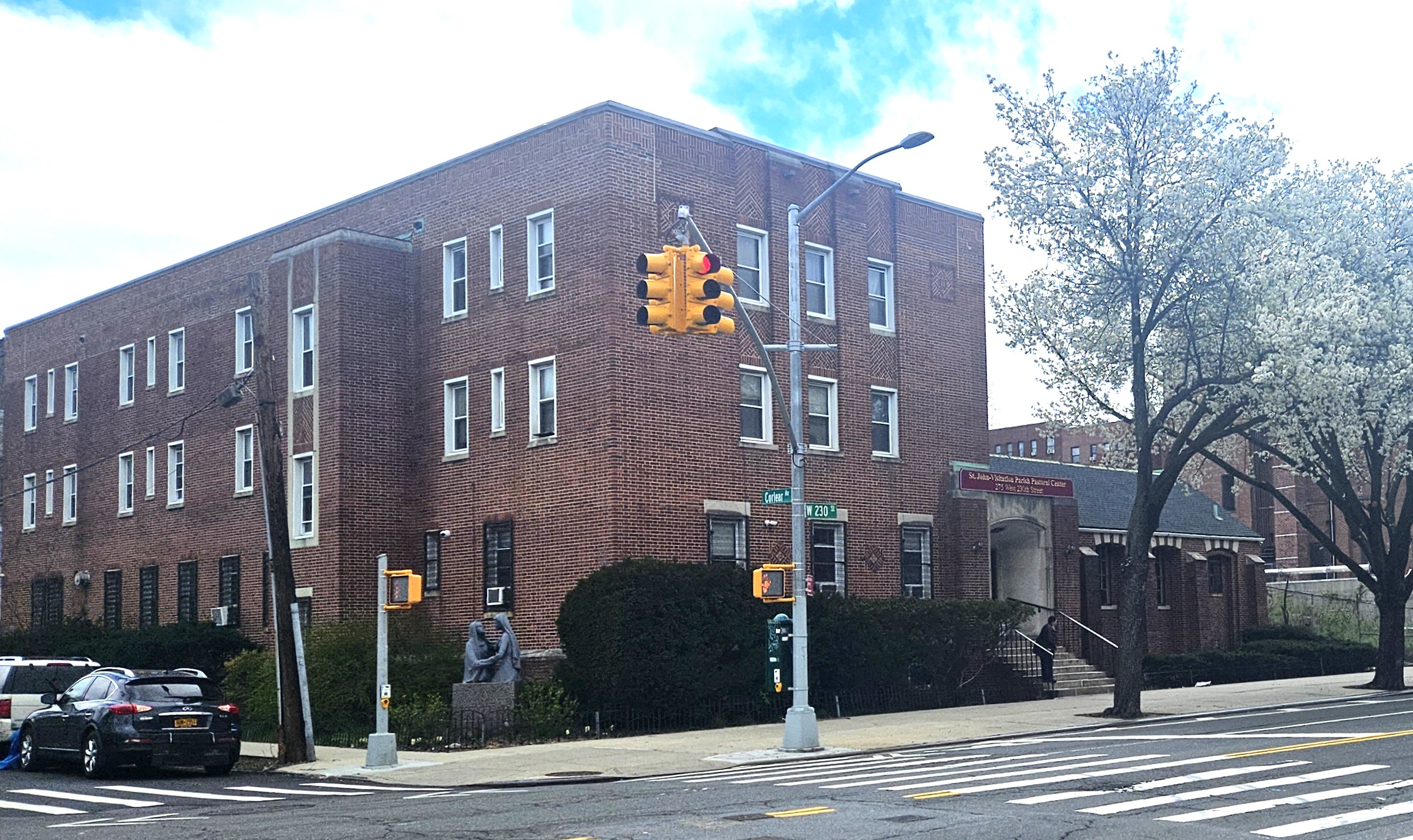
Former convent of the RJM Sisters at 275 West 230th in The Bronx

The RJM remain active in the parish and neighborhood. The Family of Jesus and Mary, a group made up of sisters and lay associates, meets monthly at the parish center (their former convent) and also conducts a monthly flea market at PS 207 (the former Godwin Terrace building of St. John's School) to support the RJM mission in Haiti. RJM currently live nearby in Yonkers and RJM Sr. Patricia Brito serves as principal of St. Frances de Chantal School in the Throggs Neck neighborhood of The Bronx.

== St. John’s Parish School ==
Having its roots in the parish with the establishment of the Academy of Jesus and Mary in 1903, it became known as St. John's School in 1925. Multiple major building projects and expansions took place at locations on Godwin Terrace and Kingsbridge Ave.

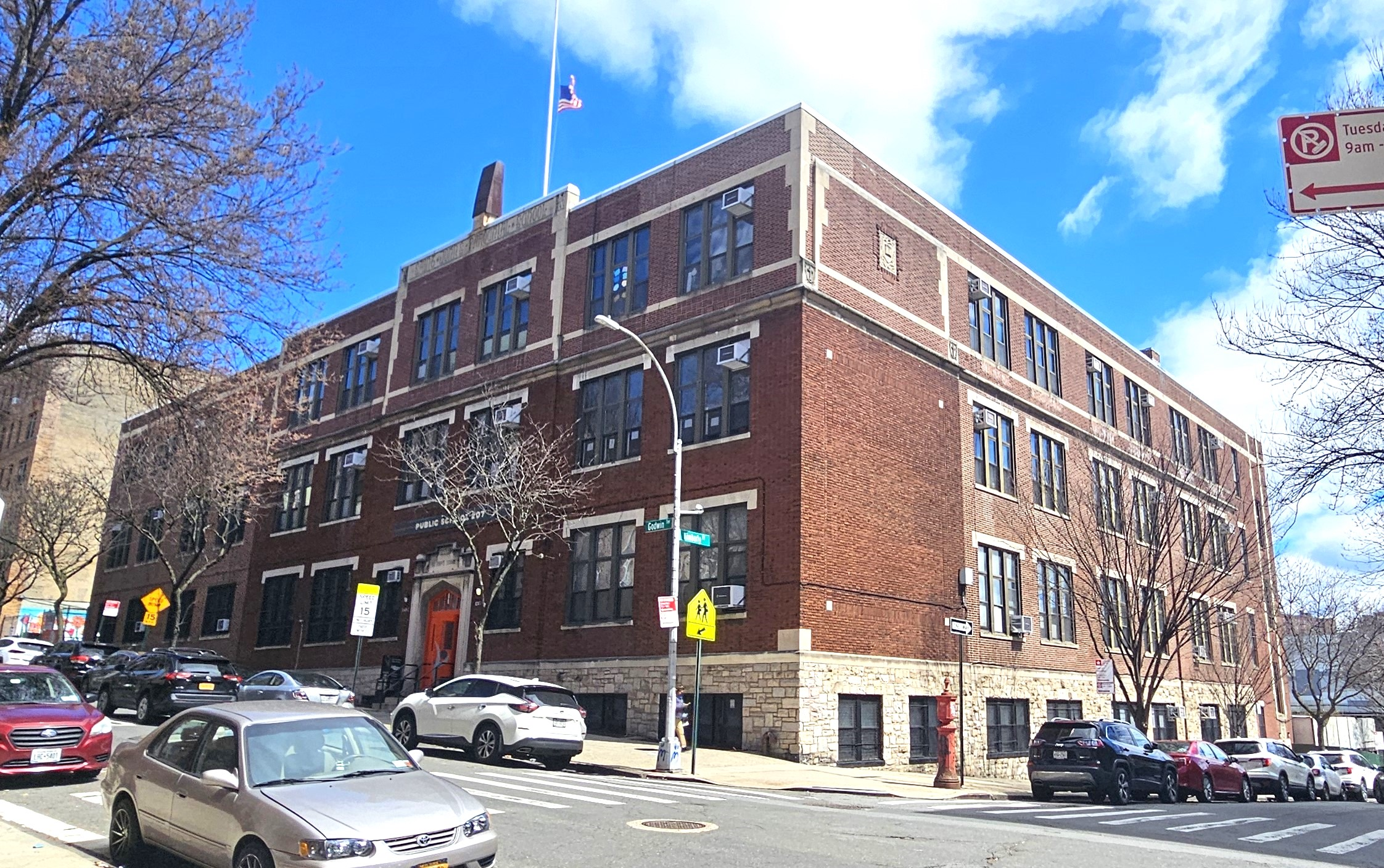
Former St. John's Kingsbridge - 3030 Godwin Terrace, The Bronx, Currently PS 207.

In 1914, the parish school had an attendance of 73 boys and 114 girls, and was run by six sisters from the Convent of Jesus and Mary at Kingsbridge. In 1935, land for a new school building was purchased on Godwin Terrace across from the RJM convent. The building on Kingsbridge Ave. was constructed in 1953. After enrollment in the school began to decline, the parish entered into a relationship with the City of New York to lease a building for use as a public school. Originally, the public school utilized the Kingsbridge Ave. building while St. John's School used the Godwin Terrace building. In 1992, the schools changed places. The parochial school was located on 3143 Kingsbridge Avenue when it closed in July, 2020, and the other building currently serves as PS 207 at 3030 Godwin Terrace.

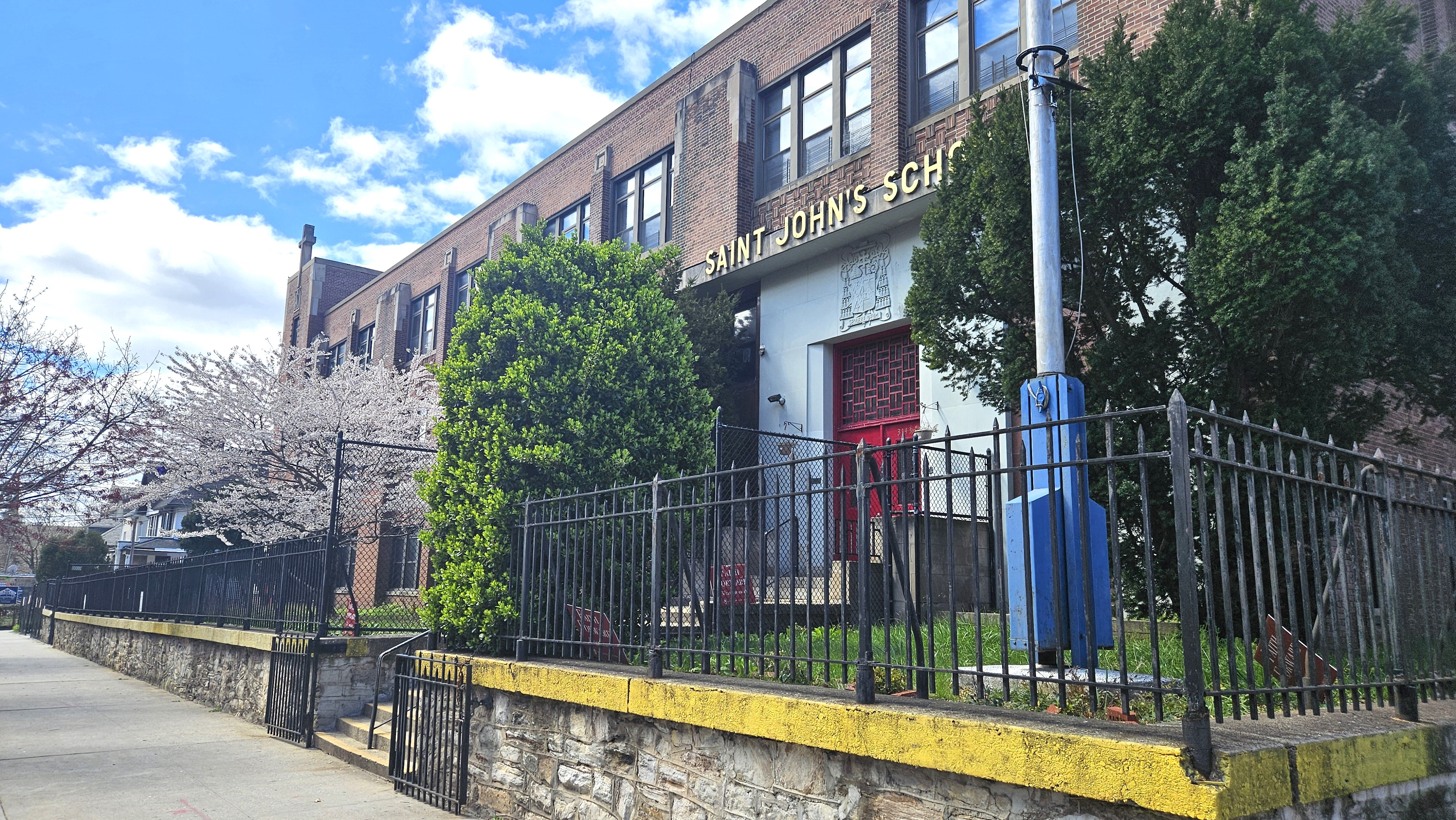
Former St. John's School - 3143 Kingsbridge Avenue, The Bronx (closed 2020)

In 1950, the Brothers of the Christian Schools (De La Salle Brothers) took charge of the Boys' Department of St. John's School at the invitation of Monsignor Martin Scanlan. For more than 20 years Christian Brothers continued to serve the parish until, with vocations declining, they withdrew. Memorable members of their community were Brothers Celestine George, first principal, Arthur Philip, renowned educator in numerous Bronx Parish schools and Adelbert Patrick, noted musician and choral director. Notable educators among the sisters were Mother Mary Catherine (Kenny), Mother Camillus and Mother Regis. Religious of Jesus and Mary continued to minister in the school until 2018, Sr. Patricia Brito was the last RJM to serve as principal of St. John's Kingsbridge. When it closed in 2020, St. John's School provided PreK-3 through Grade 8 as one of the last Catholic schools in the area.
