= Church of the Visitation of the Blessed Virgin Mary (Bronx) =

Roman Catholic church in New York City

Coordinates: 40°53′9.1″N 73°53′54″W

The Church of the Visitation of the Blessed Virgin Mary
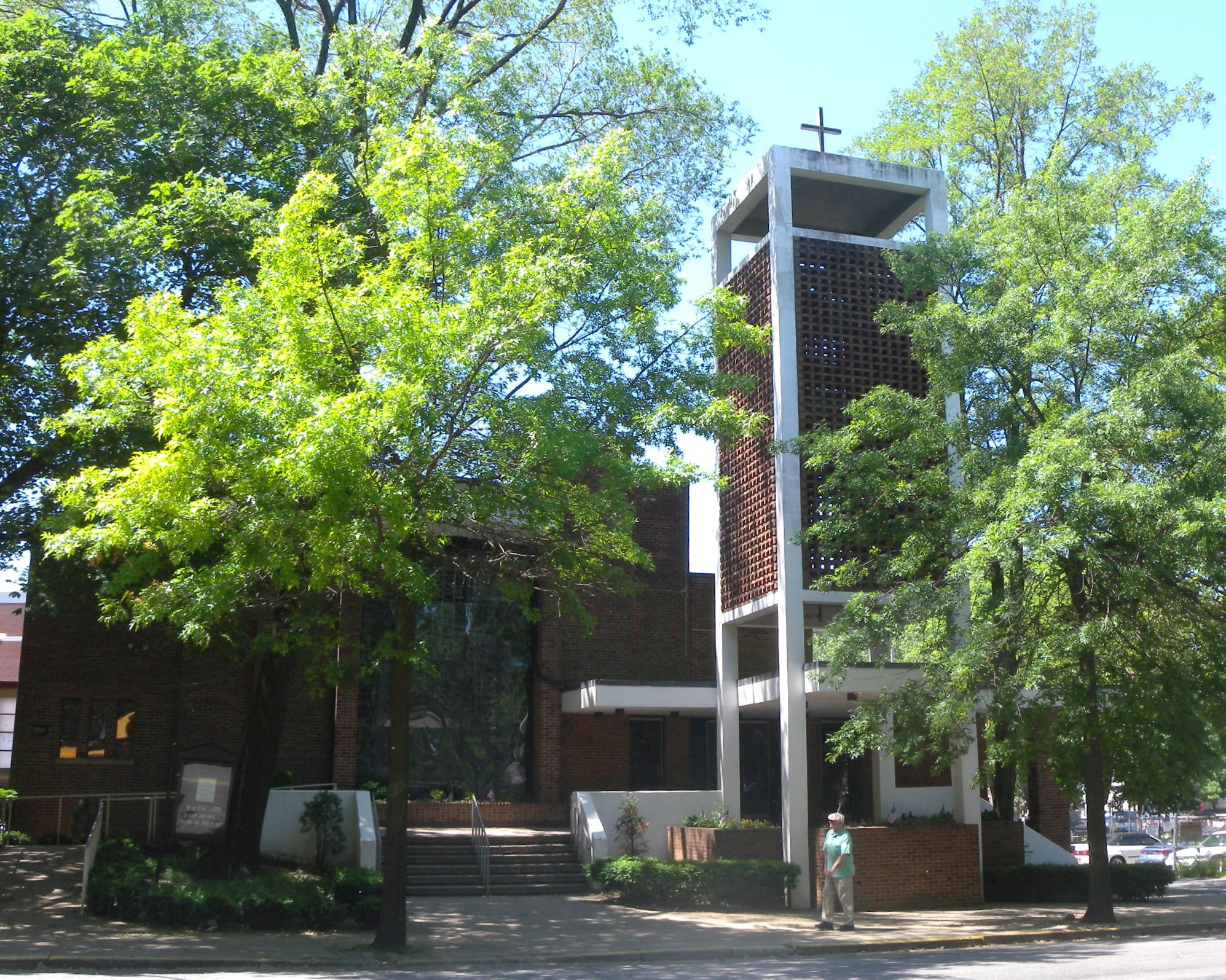
- Interactive map of the The Church of the Visitation of the Blessed Virgin Mary area

General information
- Architectural style: Modernist
- Location: Kingsbridge, Bronx, New York City, United States of America
- Completed: 1953 (for present church); 1953 (for present school)
- Cost: $200,000 (for 1953 school)
- Client: Roman Catholic Archdiocese of New York

Technical details
- Structural system: Brick and reinforced concrete

The Church of the Visitation of the Blessed Virgin Mary was a Roman Catholic parish church under the authority of the Roman Catholic Archdiocese of New York, located at 160 Van Cortlandt Park South, Kingsbridge, Bronx, New York City, New York.

== History ==
The parish was established in 1928. The original structure was a combined school-over-church, common to the city. Construction of the Major Deegan Expressway caused the church to move to its present site in 1951. Ground-breaking for the new church was held in February 1952, Bishop Joseph P. Donahue officiating.

Both church and school were completed 1953 as Modernist brick and reinforced concrete structures. Cardinal Spellman dedicated the parish school building, which was completed in 1953 at a cost of $200,000. The rectory address is 160 Van Cortlandt Park South, Bronx NY 10463.

The parish school is at 171 West 239th Street, Bronx NY 10463.

On November 2, 2014, the parish was merged with that of Church of St. John, and on June 30, 2017, the church was deconsecrated. In 2022, a school and apartment complex were proposed for the site.

On June 19, 2023, demolition of the church had been completed, and demolition of the school building was nearly complete.
