= Mariä Heimsuchung, Munich =

Church building in Munich, Germany

Coordinates: 48°08′13″N 11°31′44″E

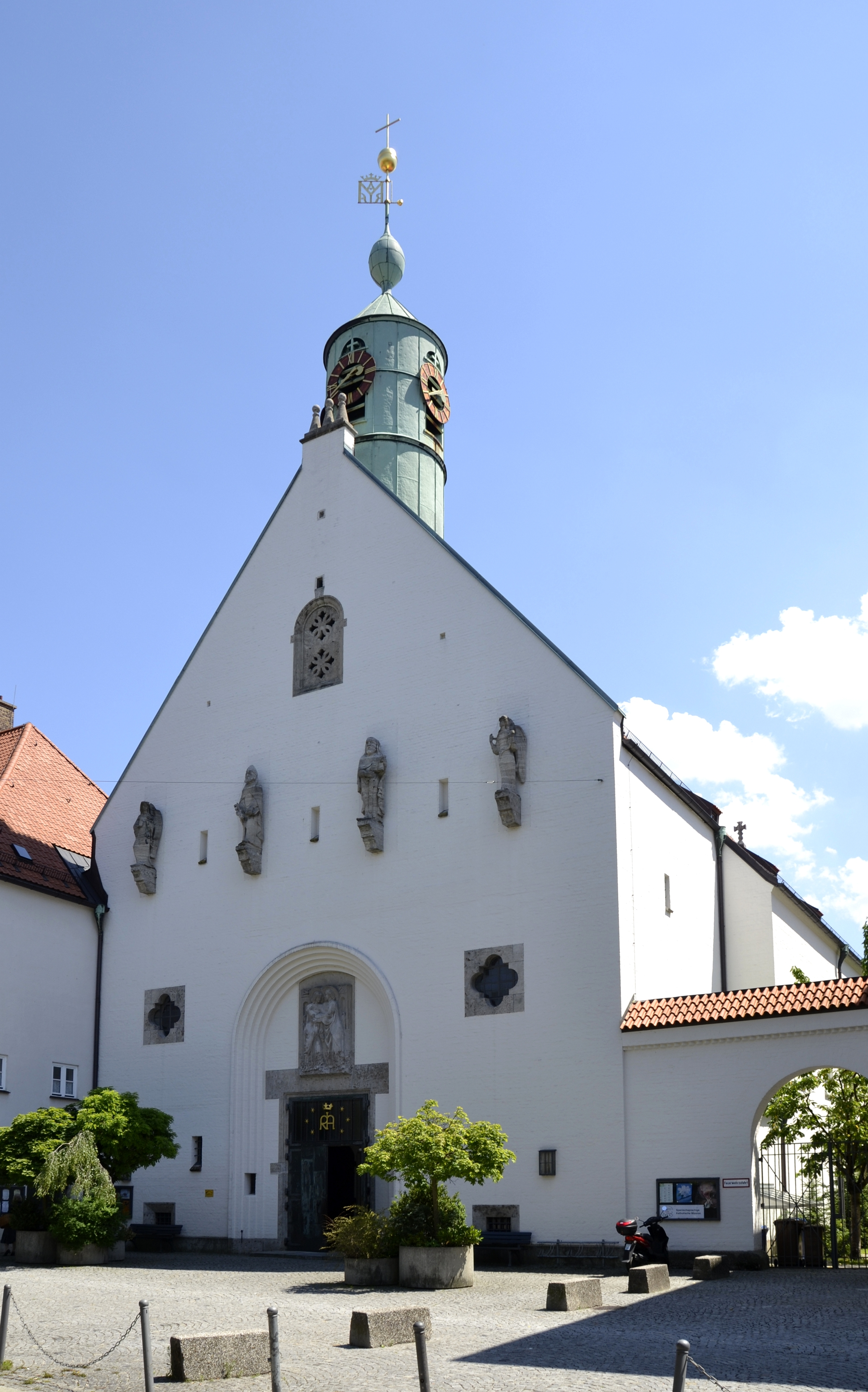
Mariä Heimsuchung

Mariä Heimsuchung (Church of the Visitation of the Blessed Virgin Mary) is a Catholic parish church in Munich, Germany. It was built from 1933 to 1934 in neo-Romanesque style by Oswald Bieber and government architect William Hollweck. The new building was necessary due to the strong growth of the mother parish of St. Rupert.

The Visitation of Mary to Elizabeth is shown on the relief over the portal of the church.
