= Church of the Visitation of the Virgin Mary, Nitra =

Roman Catholic church in Nitra, Slovakia

Coordinates: 48.3123°N 18.0858°E

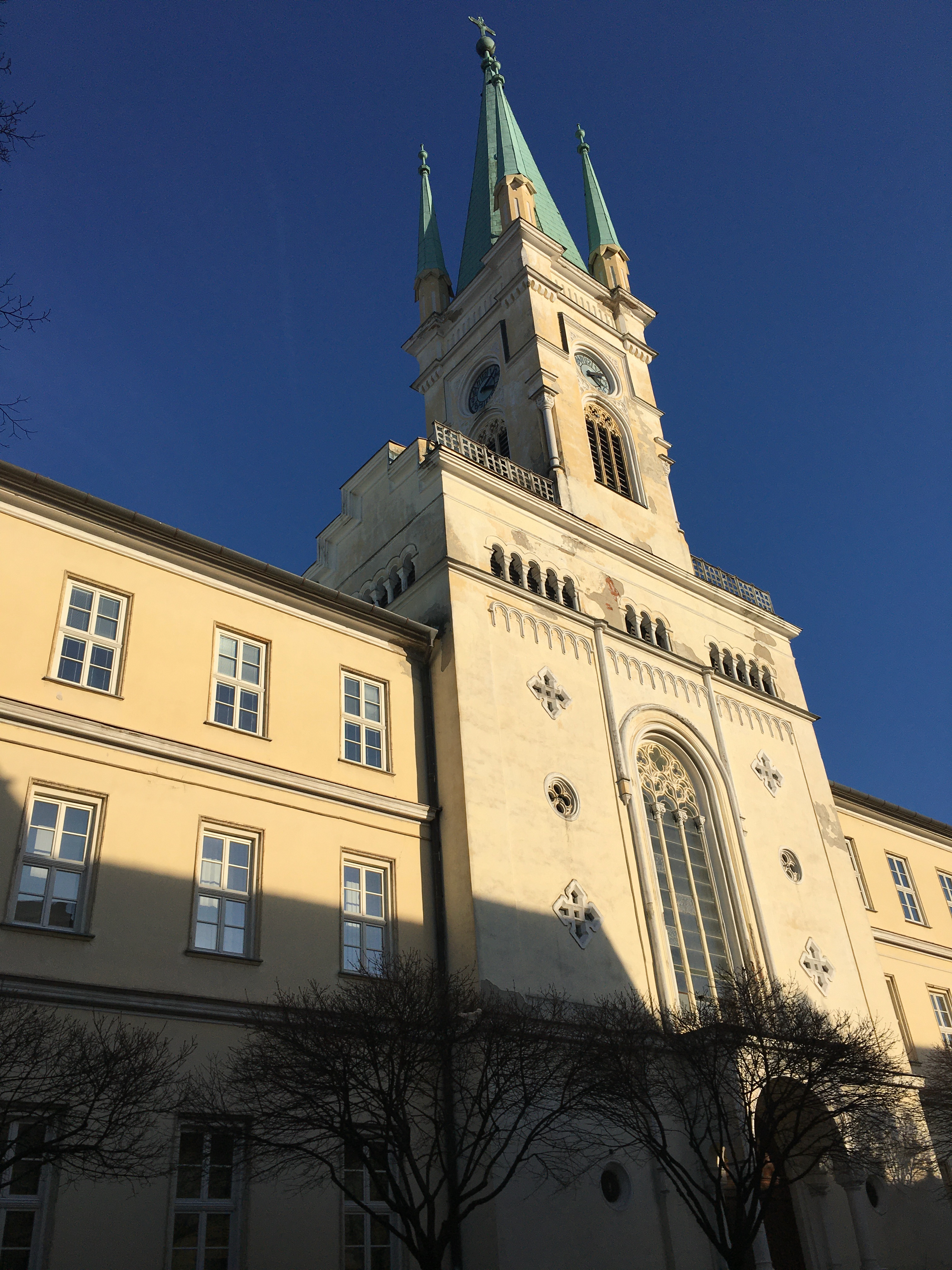
- Church of the Visitation of the Virgin Mary, Nitra

The Church of the Visitation of the Virgin Mary (Slovak: Kostol Navštívenia Panny Márie) is a Roman Catholic church in Nitra, Slovakia.

It was first built as a Gothic church in the 14th century. It was rebuilt in the Renaissance style in the first third of the 17th century and was then changed again to the Gothic style in the 18th century. In 1911 the church was reconstructed.

In the interior, there are Gothic architectural details, Renaissance paintings (by Podmanicky), and a Baroque sculptural group from the cemetery chapel. In front of the church is the statue of the Virgin Mary.
