= Gerónimo Antonio de Ezquerra =

Spanish painter (c.1660–1733)

Gerónimo Antonio de Ezquerra (c. 1660–1733) was a Spanish painter of the Baroque period.

He was a pupil of Antonio Palomino. He often painted half-torso saints. He frescoed the lunnetes over the arches of the chapel of the church of St. Felipe Neri en Madrid. He excelled in bodegones. In 1725, he was granted the power to provide estimates for the old paintings that were being evaluated by Antonio Palomino y Juan García de Miranda.
