= Old St. Peter's Church (Poughkeepsie, New York) =

Church in New York, United States

Old St. Peter Church (now Our Lady of Mt. Carmel)
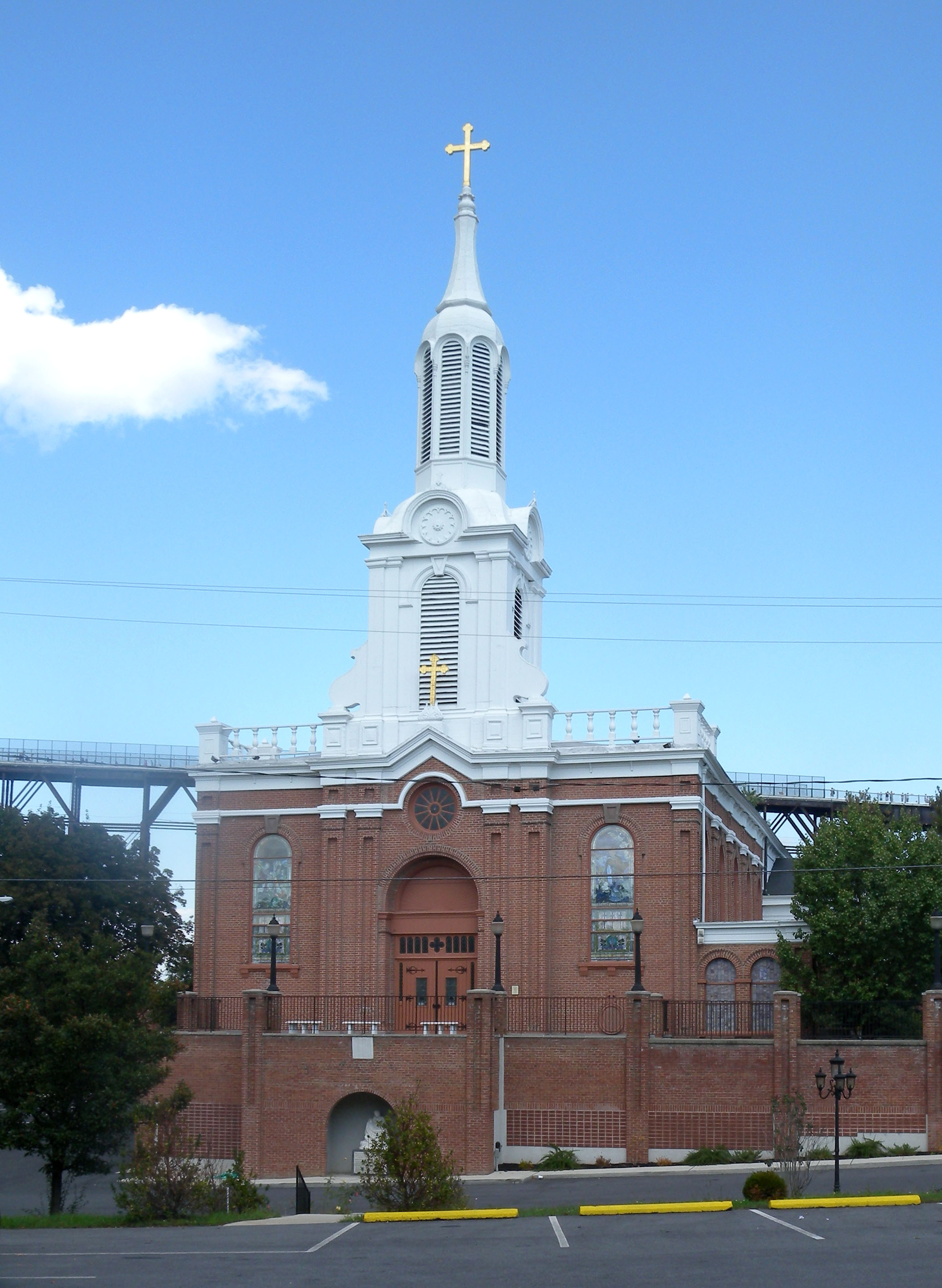
- Interactive map of the Old St. Peter Church (now Our Lady of Mt. Carmel) area

General information
- Location: Poughkeepsie, New York, United States
- Coordinates: 41.7093°N 73.9369°W
- Owner: Roman Catholic Archdiocese of New York

The Old Church of St. Peter is a Roman Catholic church established under the authority of the Roman Catholic Archdiocese of New York in Poughkeepsie, Dutchess County, New York in 1837. It is the second oldest Catholic Church on the Hudson (after St. Mary's in Albany) and is considered the Mother Church of the Hudson Valley because from it all the parishes in Ulster and Dutchess counties were founded. The church is also referred to as Our Lady of Mount Carmel since 1965 when St. Peter's parish relocated to Hyde Park, New York and the parish of Our Lady of Mount Carmel church (located a block away) relocated to site.

== History ==
=== Congregation of the Hudson ===
Twenty-two years after the Diocese of New York was founded in 1808, Bishop John DuBois, in 1830, authorized a Dominican, Father Phillip O’Reilly to establish parishes on the Hudson River north of Manhattan Island. The first congregation he ministered to was the small group of 28 Irish-born Catholic families, who on October 14, 1831, were organized as the Congregation on the Hudson.

Philip O'Reilly O.P. was stationed at Newburgh, New York from 1830 to 1832 and would visit Poughkeepsie once a month in summer. Fr. Patrick Duffy was pastor of Paterson, New Jersey from 1823 to 1836, when he was sent first to Our Lady of Loretto in Cold Spring. From there he served congregations in West Point, Cold Spring, Newburgh, Saugerties, Rondout, and Poughkeepsie. When the house of Robert Belton became too small for the number attending, Mass was celebrated in the old brewery, near the Lower Landing at Pine Street. And later at the Hibbasus' hall on Market Street near Jay Street.

=== St. Peter's Church ===
By 1825 emigrants from Ireland were numerous enough in Poughkeepsie to form a well defined segment of the population. In 1837 a church building was erected on land donated by Peter Everett. When some bigoted individuals threatened to burn it down, a vigilance committee, made up of Catholics and Protestants, was formed to defend it. Dr. Pyne, a non-Catholic offered the defenders the loan of a small cannon. There was no further trouble. The church was dedicated by Bishop DuBois on November 26, 1837. Rev. Patrick Duffy, pastor of Our Lady of Loreto Parish in Cold Springs who had been charged with the spiritual care of Poughkeepsie was then transferred to Newburgh. Rev. John McGinnis was named first pastor of St. Peter's Parish in Poughkeepsie. The missions at Saugerties and Rondout were made dependencies of St. Peter's with expectation that each would be attended at least once a month.

In 1839 McGinnis was transferred to St. James in New York and succeeded by Rev. John N. Smith. It was Smith who erected a small frame church at Rondout. He also made pastoral trips to Rosendale. In 1842 Rev. Myles Maxwell became pastor at St. Peter's when Smith was himself assigned to St. James in New York. (Smith would die there in February 1848, having contracted ship's fever while attending the deathbed of Rev. Mark Murphy who had been ministering to immigrants at the quarantine station on Staten Island.)

Father Michael Riordan became pastor in September 1844 and "steered it safely" through the "Know-Nothing" agitation at that time. He had substantial influence among the Irish building the railroad and more than once quelled disturbances that threatened to turn into riots.

In 1894 Father James Nilan commissioned the paintings of the Stations of the Cross and had them shipped from Rome. The Apostolic Nuncio from Washington and Archbishop Michael Corrigan of New York attended the dedication. Removed during subsequent renovation, they were discovered when Our Lady of Mount Carmel assumed occupancy of Old St. Peter's and restored. Our Lady of Mount Carmel parish held a celebration in 1994, on the centennial anniversary of their dedication.

The abandoned rectory burned around 1977.

==== Mission churches ====
In those early days, the spiritual needs of the local Catholic community were met by priests riding circuit out of St. Peter's in Poughkeepsie. Father Maginnis (1837) was pastor not only of all Dutchess County, but also of Rondout and Saugerties across the river. By 1840 St. Peter's parish also included mission churches in Sylvan Lake and New Hamburg. Father Michael Riordan, pastor of St. Peter's, and Father Myles Maxwell are remembered among a number of priests from St. Peter's' who also tended to St.Mary's in Wappingers Falls, founded in 1845.

=== Parish Relocation ===
In 1965 St. Peter's parish re-located to Hyde Park, NY, although it kept a Poughkeepsie address. A school and convent were built and parish Masses were offered in the school chapel and auditorium. A rectory was not built until 1975 and until then priests continued to commute from the rectory in the city of Poughkeepsie. Currently, the parish offices are at St. Peter's Cemetery on Salt Point Turnpike. In 1999, St. Peter's Parish worked out a deal with New York State to use the Chapel of Our Lady of the Rosary which had been part of Hudson River State Hospital. St. Peter's parishioners restored the chapel by June 29, 1999. The state sold the chapel to the Archdiocese of New York and granted easements of access on West Cottage and Recreation Drive.

=== Pastors ===
- Rev. John Maginnis (1837–1839)
- Rev. John N. Smith (1839–1842)
- Rev. Myles Maxwell (1842–1844)
- Rev. Joseph P. Burke (May–September 1844)
- Rev. Michael Riordan (September 1844 – 1870)
- Rev. Francis Caro, O.F.M. (1870–1872)
- Rev. Dr. Patrick McSweeney (1872–1877)
- Rev. James Nilan (1877–1902)
- Rev. William Livingston (1902–1906)
- Rev. Joseph F. Sheahan (1906-1934)
- Rt. Rev. Msgr. Stephen Connelly, V.F., P.R. (1934-1944)
- Msgr. Valentine Snyder (1944-1948)
- Msgr. Michael O'Shea (1948-1959)

== Architecture ==
The rectangular-on-plan Baroque Revival red brick church with marble trim is composed of a street-facing three-bay front facade, and a five-bay nave. Low-pitched roof concealed to forward bay by painted timber balustraded parapet. Two-stage painted timber square-on-plan tower rises out of center facade bay with octagonal second stages surmounted by a bellcast-needle-like spire: both stage louvred. Red brick walls detailed with marble platband plinths, cornices, and parapet coping. Round-headed double-height stained-glass windows to each bay with separating pilasters detailed with limestone capitals.

== St. Peter's School ==
St. Peter's School was established 166 years ago when Father Michael Riordan, Pastor of St. Peter's Church, saw a need for Catholic education in the Poughkeepsie area. The school was established in the basement of the Church, which was then on Mill Street in Poughkeepsie. By 1860, there was a great need to expand. It was around that time that the Sisters of Charity of Mount St. Vincent arrived to take charge of the girls' school on Clove St. In 1869, a boys' school was established across the street. In 1914 there were 325 boys enrolled in the school taught by five Marist Brothers, and 310 girls at the girls' school taught by six Sisters of Charity.

In 1965, the school was relocated to its present location on Violet Avenue. It closed in 2020.

== St. Peter's Cemetery ==
Old St.Peter's Churchyard was located in the city of Poughkeepsie, NY on the east side of East Mansion St. and was in use from 1841 to 1884. The burying ground an East Mansion street, a parochial cemetery, was the resting place of a number of the first generation of Irish Immigrants to this locality. Subsequently, a second St. Peter's Cemetery was established on Salt Point Rd. in Poughkeepsie.

=== Celtic cross ===
On a prominent rise overlooking St. Peter's Cemetery is a World War I monument in memory of over 100 local men who served in World War I. The Celtic cross was originally built in 1917 of pre-cast concrete. By 1993 it was so badly deteriorated that it was dismantled and replaced the following year by one of solid granite approximately 30 feet tall.

== Churches that developed from St. Peter's ==
- St. Mary's, Rondout 1842
  - St. Joseph's, Kingston 1868
    - Holy Name of Jesus, Wilbur (Kingston) 1887 - later merged with St. Mary's, Rondout
- St.Mary's (Wappingers Falls) 1845
  - St.Joachim (Matteawan) 1861 - merged with St. John the Evangelist 2004
    - St. Mary's (Fishkill) 1864
    - St.John the Evangelist (Fishkill Landing) 1887
    - St. Francis (Timoneyville/ Dutchess Junction) 1899
  - St. Denis (Sylvan Lake) 1899
    - St. Columba's (Hopewell Junction) 1992
      - Blessed Kateri Tekakwitha (LaGrange) 2002
  - Immaculate Conception (Amenia) 1866
    - St.Patrick's Chapel (Millerton) 1867
    - St. John the Evangelist (Pawling) 1885
      - St. Charles Borromeo (Dover Plains) 1936
        - Our Lady of Solace (Wingdale) 1962
    - St. Joseph's (Millbrook) 1889
- Church of the Nativity/St. Martin de Porres (Poughkeepsie) 1852
- St. Joseph's Chapel (Rhinecliff) 1862
  - St. Paul's Chapel (Staatsburg) 1887
    - Regina Coeli (Hyde Park) - 1887.
  - Sacred Heart (Barrytown) 1886
    - St. Christopher's (Red Hook) 1975
  - Good Shepherd (Rhinebeck) 1975
- St. Mary's (Poughkeepsie) 1873
- Our Lady of Mount Carmel Poughkeepsie (1910)
- St. John the Baptist (Poughkeepsie)

== Records of Closed Churches ==
Parish records for the Church of the Nativity, formerly on Union Street, remain in the City of Poughkeepsie at Old St. Peter's Church (now Our Lady of Mount Carmel Church).

Parish records for St John the Baptist, formerly located at 1 Grand Street, and which closed in 2007, are also at Old St. Peters.

== St. Peter's, Hyde Park ==
=== Our Lady of the Rosary Chapel ===
The parish church for St. Peter's, now in Hyde park, New York, is the chapel of Our Lady of the Rosary. The chapel is located on the grounds of the former Hudson River State Hospital and was a gift to the archdiocese by the Smith Brothers (of cough drop fame), in memory of their sister, Sister Mary Loretta Smith R.S.M. It was designed and built by Father John Casey S.J. in 1906. The altar is Carrara marble. The stained glass windows depicting the life of Mary and Jesus are all Lafarge, a protégé of Tiffany. The ceiling arches and pews are all hand-hewn oak. The Baptistery and Pulpit are from an 1880 Church in Philadelphia in which Mother Saint Katherine Drexel was baptized. The marble altar angels and Last Supper were sculptured in a studio in New York City in 1907. The roof is of local blue slate and the outside walls are built of New York field stone. It is located in the center of a hollow with winding roads and a stone bridge all designed by the famous New York City Central Park architect, Frederick Law Olmsted. The chapel has a seating capacity of about 400. All the statues and stations of the cross were created the year the chapel was built in 1906.

The vacant chapel was ready for demolition in 1999 when Rev. James Garisto advocated for the NY Archdiocese to purchase the property located on the grounds of the old abandoned psychiatric hospital. The property was purchased from the State of New York and restored by the parishioners of Saint Peter's.
