= St. Stanislaus' Church (Pleasant Valley, New York) =

The Church of St. Stanislaus is located at 1590 Main St, Pleasant Valley, NY 12569

== History ==
It was founded by Jesuits in 1903. The parish was dedicated to St. Stanislaus Kostka, a Polish Jesuit seminarian. The parish began with services in a barn on the inn property across the street from where the church now stands. The parish was attended by priests from the Jesuit novitiate St. Andrew-on-the-Hudson, in Hyde Park. The novitiate is now the site of the main campus of the Culinary Institute of America.

A small chapel was originally built for services on the current site and the present building was erected in 1956. The sanctuary of the church was renovated between 1999 and 2000.

St. Stanislaus Kostka is one of five parishes in the Northeast Cluster. "Clusters" are groups of parishes that work together to assist each other in spiritual and educational work. The other parishes are St. Joseph’s in Millbrook, Immaculate Conception in Amenia, St. Charles Borromeo in Dover Plains and St. John the Evangelist in Pawling.
