= James J. LeBar =

American priest (1936–2008)

James J. LeBar (May 19, 1936 – February 21, 2008) was a Roman Catholic priest who was the chief exorcist of the Archdiocese of New York in the United States.

== Early career ==
LeBar was ordained in 1962. He was assigned as chaplain to Hudson Valley Psychiatric Center in 1982 and served until his retirement there in 2005. Previously, he was a parochial vicar at Our Lady of Mount Carmel, Poughkeepsie from 1980 to 1982; St. Stanislaus, Pleasant Valley from 1979 to 1980; St. Catherine Laboure, Lake Katrine from 1973 to 1979 and from 1965 to 1967; St. Joseph's, Kingston from 1967 to 1973; St. Gregory Barbarigo, Garnerville in 1967; and St. John the Evangelist, White Plains from 1962 to 1965. He served briefly as administrator of St. Colman's, East Kingston, and Holy Name of Jesus, Kingston.

He taught religion at John A. Coleman Catholic High School from 1966 to 1970. In the 1970s, LeBar was asked to become part of the Office of Communications of the Archdiocese of New York which at the time was dealing with the rise of groups they called "cults" and occult activity. In 1976, he was one of the priest advisors who supported the National Catholic Committee on Scouting's attendance with a Scout Service Corps at the 41st International Eucharistic Congress in Philadelphia and attended that event. He performed his first exorcisms in 1988 and 1989. In 1989, he published his book Cults, Sects, and the New Age. He counseled many former "cult members" and was a frequent speaker on this subject. He appeared as a guest on the Geraldo Rivera special Devil Worship Exposing Satan's Underground, which aired on October 22, 1988.

== Exorcist of the Archdiocese of New York ==
He first came to prominence in 1991 when he took part in an exorcism in Palm Beach, Florida, broadcast on the television program 20/20. He was appointed the chief exorcist of New York in 1992, by Cardinal John Joseph O'Connor. On June 25, 1995, LeBar was one of the guests on the Geraldo Rivera television program exploring satanic ritual abuse.

When asked during an interview if he ever witnessed levitation during an exorcism, he said "I myself, have never seen a major levitation in the course of an exorcism. However, in one case in the preliminary investigation, I had a person who rose up above the pews of the church and was suspended there for a few minutes."

He told Spirit Daily at the time of the 25th anniversary release of the film The Exorcist that it "is about the most accurate portrayal of what can happen at an exorcism that I have ever seen."

Actress Winona Ryder spoke with LeBar about exorcisms in 1999 in order to prepare for her film role in the movie Lost Souls in which LeBar was one of the consultants. He allowed her to view some videotapes of exorcisms he had performed. Performance artist Linda Montano has done work related to LeBar posthumously.

In July 2002, LeBar addressed a conference of Roman Catholic exorcists in Rome. He lived and worked in New York State and was assigned as chaplain of the Hudson River Psychiatric Center in Poughkeepsie, New York, a post he has held for almost 20 years.

== Death ==
LeBar died of heart failure on the morning of February 21, 2008, at St. Francis Hospital in Poughkeepsie, New York. According to friends and colleagues, he was admitted to St. Francis and diagnosed with a bacterial infection which became septic. He was placed in intensive care and placed on a ventilator until he died of heart failure.

LeBar was buried from Regina Coeli Parish in Hyde Park, New York, where he was in residence for nearly the last 25 years, especially while he served during most of that time as priest-chaplain to the Hudson Valley Psychiatric Center. His body lay in-state at the church, where visitation were held on Sunday, February 24 in the afternoon and evening; the Mass of Christian Burial was concelebrated with one of the auxiliary bishops of New York on Monday, February 25, at 10:00.

According to a colleague of LeBar: "For those of us who knew and worked with him, were served or mentored by him, we are trying with God’s grace to come to terms with this loss, both personally and for the Church in America. I have often remarked about Father’s disarmingly dry sense of humor—a hallmark of the same man who at times directly addressed and expelled demonic forces. A friend asked yesterday 'I wonder what Father LeBar will say when he sees God the Father?' I have no doubt that his sincere but usually witty response, along with his slight Bronx accent, will be something like 'Well—you do look better in person'".

== Posthumous ==
On April 26, 2019, the Archdiocese of New York published an Update on the Sexual Abuse Crisis which included LeBar in its list of clergy who were not' found to have been credibly accused of sexual abuse of a minor, but for whom "the IRCP’s independent administrators have determined that claims against them were eligible for compensation." The list notes that "A determination by the IRCP that a claim is eligible for compensation is not equivalent to a finding by a judge or jury that a clergy member is liable for sexual abuse of a minor under civil or criminal law."
