= Gerardo Joseph Colacicco =

American priest of the Catholic Church

His Excellency, The Most Reverend Gerardo Joseph Colacicco
- Auxiliary Bishop of New York; Titular Bishop of Erdonia
- Archdiocese: New York
- Appointed: October 10, 2019
- Installed: December 10, 2019

Orders
- Ordination: November 6, 1982 by Terence Cooke
- Consecration: December 10, 2019 by Timothy M. Dolan, Henry J. Mansell, and Gerald Thomas Walsh

Personal details
- Born: September 19, 1955 (age 71) Poughkeepsie, New York
- Education: Marist College; Saint Joseph's Seminary; Pontifical University of Saint Thomas Aquinas
- Motto: Credo (I believe)

Styles of Gerardo Joseph Colacicco
- Reference style: His Excellency; The Most Reverend
- Spoken style: Your Excellency
- Religious style: Bishop

Gerardo Joseph Colacicco (born September 19, 1955) is an American Catholic prelate who has served as an auxiliary bishop for the Archdiocese of New York in New York since 2019. He serves as the episcopal vicar for the northern counties of the archdiocese.

== Biography ==
=== Early life ===
Geraldo Colacicco was born on September 19, 1955, in Poughkeepsie, New York, the eldest of four children of Angelo and Irma Colacicco. Angelo Colacicco worked for the US Postal Service, then became a custodian at St. Mary's Parish in Poughkeepsie. During high school and college, Geraldo Colacicco worked at the St. Mary's rectory. He later identified Reverend Matthew J. Cox from St. Mary's and Reverend Joseph Maria Pernicone from Our Lady of Mount Carmel Parish in Poughkeepsie as influences on him.

Colacicco graduated in 1978 with a Bachelor of Arts in history from Marist College in Poughkeepsie, New York, with minors in philosophy and Russian studies. He then entered Saint Joseph's Seminary in Yonkers, New York. During his studies at Saint Joseph's, Colacicco served as a transitional deacon at Sacred Heart Parish in Newburgh, New York.

=== Priesthood ===
On November 6, 1982, Colacicco was ordained to the priesthood at St. Patrick's Cathedral in Manhattan for the Archdiocese of New York by Cardinal Terence Cooke. The archdiocese assigned Colacicco as parochial vicar at the following New York parishes:

- Good Shepherd Parish, Rhinebeck (1982–1984)
- Our Lady of Fatima, Scarsdale (1984–1987)
- St. Denis, Hopewell Junction (1987–1989)

In 1989, Cardinal John O'Connor appointed Colacicco as his priest-secretary. Colacicco then traveled to Rome to study at the Pontifical University of Saint Thomas Aquinas, where he received a Licentiate of Canon Law in 1992.

After returning to New York, the archdiocese placed Colacicco as a judge on the metropolitan tribunal. He was also named as director of pastoral formation at Saint Joseph's Seminary. The Vatican elevated Colacicco to the rank of prelate of honor of his holiness in 1999, conferring on him the title Monsignor. Colacicco also returned to the metropolitan tribunal for another term in 2007.

He was later pastor at the following New York parishes:

- Sacred Heart, Newburgh (1996–2002)
- St. Columba's Church, Hopewell Junction (2002–2014)
- St. Joseph–Immaculate Conception Parish, Millbrook (2014–2019)

=== Auxiliary Bishop of New York ===
Pope Francis appointed Colacicco as an auxiliary bishop for the Archdiocese of New York on October 10, 2019. On December 10, 2019, Colacicco was consecrated as a bishop by Cardinal Timothy Dolan, with Archbishop Henry J. Mansell and Auxiliary Bishop Gerald Walsh acting as co-consecrators.

As auxiliary bishop, Colacicco is the episcopal vicar for the northern counties of the archdiocese which include Dutchess, Orange, Putnam, Ulster, and Sullivan counties. In April 2020, as part of the Good Friday liturgy at St. Patrick's Cathedral, Colacicco gave a meditation on the seven last words said to have been spoken by Jesus from the cross. Due to the coronavirus pandemic, the service was live-streamed. His reflections were subsequently published in Beneath the Cross. Colacicco is a member of the Knights of Columbus and is an associate chaplain for the New York State Council of the Knights.

In April 2026, he was named Vicar for the Clergy of the Archdiocese of New York by Archbishop Ronald Hicks.

== See also ==
- Catholic Church hierarchy
- Catholic Church in the United States
- Historical list of the Catholic bishops of the United States
- List of Catholic bishops of the United States
