= St. Charles Borromeo's Church (Dover Plains, New York) =

Church of St. Charles Borromeo
- Church of St. Charles Borromeo
- 41°44′29.9″N 73°34′25″W
- Location: 83 Mill Street, Dover Plains, New York
- Denomination: Roman Catholic
- Website: St. Charles Borromeo Church

History
- Founded: 1936

Administration
- Archdiocese: Archdiocese of New York

The Church of St. Charles Borromeo is a Roman Catholic parish church under the authority of the Roman Catholic Archdiocese of New York, located in Dover Plains, Dutchess County, New York. It was founded in 1866 as a mission of Immaculate Conception Parish of Amenia. In 1885 it became a mission of St. John the Evangelist's Church in Pawling, and was finally itself elevated to parish status in 1936.

== History ==
Dover Plains was a branch mission served first by Father Michael Riordan, pastor of St. Peter's, Poughkeepsie; then later by Denis Sheehan, pastor of St. Mary's, Wappingers Falls.

In 1859 Archbishop Hughes appointed Rev. Charles Slevin, as the first resident priest. Father Slavin became responsible for the whole Harlem Valley. He resided at Dover Plains and built the church there. Dover Plains was chosen as the headquarters for the missions of Amenia, Beekman, Millbrook, Millerton, and Pawling, where there were no churches. It was Father Slevin who built St. Charles' church. He was drafted during the Civil War, but his congregation made up the $300 fee to gain his exemption. Father Slevin left in 1864. His successor, Rev. John Arsenigo lived in Purdy's Station.

In 1886 Father Tandy became resident Pastor at Immaculate Conception in Amenia, with Pawling and Dover as missions. With the appointment in 1872 of Father Healy to St. John the Evangelist responsibility for St. Charles' mission was transferred to Pawling.

In September 2018, Timothy Cardinal Dolan, Archbishop of New York, officially decreed the merger of St. John the Evangelist with St. Charles Borromeo, creating the new parish church of St. John the Evangelist-St. Charles Borromeo. The main parish office is now located in Pawling, NY. Each church retains its own Sunday Mass schedule but is served now under one pastor.

== Our Lady of Solace ==
Our Lady of Solace Chapel in nearby Wingdale was part of St. Charles Borromeo parish in Dover Plains until 2013. The mission Chapel was established in 1962 and staffed by Capuchin friars. The main purpose of the mission was to serve those at the psychiatric hospital in Wingdale—the hospital closed in the 1994, but a juvenile detention center remained open directly across from the church. Our Lady of Solace mission was closed in December 2012 and the property is now owned by Olivet Management, the corporate name of Olivet University.

== The Center for Compassion ==
Loaves & Fishes ministry is a program started by the Sisters of the Divine Compassion, providing companionship, food, and language tutoring to the residents of Dover Plains and Wingdale. The elderly and homebound of the Dover Plains area are the ministry's target population. Loaves & Fishes operates the food pantry. This pantry, stocked by the parishioners of St. Charles and area residents, provides free food to low-income families of Dover Plains and Wingdale.

Visiting, transport to doctor's offices and hospitals are provided by volunteers. The Loaves and Fishes works with local agencies, civic groups and the local parish to identify those in need. It also operates a "Backpack Program" providing some elementary school children with backpacks of food for the weekend.
