= Our Lady of Mount Carmel's Church =

Our Lady of Mount Carmel's Church may refer to:

- Our Lady of Mount Carmel's Church (Poughkeepsie, New York)
- Our Lady of Mount Carmel's Church (Bronx)
