= Church of St. Martin de Porres (Poughkeepsie, New York) =

Historic site in Dutchess County, New York

- Church of St. Martin de Porres
- 41°39′38.7″N 73°52′54.1″W
- Location: 118 Cedar Valley Road, Poughkeepsie, New York
- Denomination: Roman Catholic

History
- Status: Parish church
- Founded: 1852

Architecture
- Architectural type: Postmodern
- Groundbreaking: 1859

Administration
- Archdiocese: Archdiocese of New York

The Church of St. Martin de Porres is a Roman Catholic parish church under the authority of the Roman Catholic Archdiocese of New York, located in Poughkeepsie, Dutchess County, New York.

== History ==
=== Church of the Nativity ===
The parish was established in 1852 on Union Street, Poughkeepsie, as the Church of the Nativity for the German community of the city. Prior to that they attended services at St. Peter's Church conducted by German priests from New York City. That same year, the first church was started and a cornerstone laid. The first pastor was the Rev. Joseph Schaefler, who had served the community previously at St. Peter's, and he swiftly raised the capital to erect a rectory and school. St. Michael's parochial school opened in 1853.

Father Roesch came from Carinthia to minister to the German and Slovenian-speaking Catholics. (In 1923, the Slovak community would purchase a former Lutheran church on Grand Street and found the parish of St. John the Baptist.) Roesch wrote his former bishop that in Poughkeepsie they could not "dress as priests as we could in Germany and Austria." While he did not indicate why this was so, his tenure coincided with the rise of the anti-Catholic Know Nothing movement.

The number of parishioners grew so much that by 1859 a new church was erected. Partly due to its isolated nature, there was a quick succession of pastors. Among those the Rev. Dr. George Schrader (pastor from 1878 to 1879) purchased the cemetery, installed an organ, and added a steeple.

In 1962, Nativity Church in the City of Poughkeepsie was forced to close because the building was deemed unsafe. A new parish was formed in the Red Oaks Mill section of the Town of Poughkeepsie and rededicated to St. Martin de Porres in 1962. In the early-1960s the Archdiocese of New York was beginning to move away from the establishment of national, (i.e. ethnic) parishes. The decision to re-locate the parish outside the city caused some consternation in Poughkeepsie's German community which had been saving towards building a new church. This was aggravated further when Francis Cardinal Spellman decided as well to rename the parish after the recently canonized St. Martin de Porres.

Records of Nativity parish remain in the City of Poughkeepsie at Our Lady of Mount Carmel Church.

=== St. Martin de Porres Parish ===
Originally the parish was served with an all-purpose center that served as both church and meeting hall. Cardinal O'Connor dedicated the church and consecrated the altar at a Mass May 24, 1998. In 2019 a Rev. Matthew J. Furey took over as pastor for Msgr. James Sullivan.

== Description ==
The present church is a large gable-fronted cruciform-on-plan postmodern structure with a four-stage pyramidal-capped bell tower, surrounded by a parking lot and dense wooded areas to its rear. It was designed by Demker Cackovic Architects of Nyack. The interior features a wide array of modern stained glass with less traditional and more recently canonized or beatified Catholic figures.

== Pastors ==
=== Nativity ===
- Rev. Joseph Schaeffer (1852–1853)
- Rev. John Tanzer (1853–1855)
- Rev. James Roesch (1855–1859)
- Rev. Joseph Tuboly (1859–1861)
- Rev. Jose Volpe (1861–1864)
- Rev. Caspar John Metzler (1864–1873)
- Rev. Franz Hundhausen (1874–1878)
- Rev. Dr. George Schrader (1878–1879)
- Rev. Callus Bruder (1879–1911)
- Rev. James Roesch (1911-)

=== St. Martin's ===
- Rev. Brian E. McWeeney (1994-
- Msgr. James Sullivan (1994–2019)
- Rev. Matthew J. Furey (present)

== St. Martin de Porres School ==
St. Michael's School at Nativity was founded in 1853 by the Rev. Joseph Schaeffer. The Rev. Franz Hundhausen (pastor from 1874 to 1878) introduced the Franciscan Missionary Sisters of the Sacred Heart from Peekskill, New York as teachers of the school. They were followed around 1884 by the Sisters of Christian Charity, a congregation founded in Paderborn, Germany.

St Martin's school opened in September 1964 with 200 students in grades one to three, staffed by the Sisters of St. Dominic from Blauvelt. The parish school is located on 122 Cedar Valley Road.

In 2012, the school received the blue-ribbon school of excellence award. In 2020, the school sought and was approved for the federal PPP loan.

== Calvary Cemetery ==
The Calvary Cemetery at 62 LaGrange Avenue was purchased by the Rev. Dr. George Schrader (pastor from 1878 to 1879), and administered by Nativity Church. The church is associated with Calvary Cemetery at 62 LaGrange Avenue, Poughkeepsie, N.Y. 12603.
