= St. Paul's Chapel (Staatsburg, New York) =

Coordinates: 41°50′55.8″N 73°55′35.4″W

Chapel of St. Paul
- Chapel of St. Paul
- Location: Staatsburg, New York
- Denomination: Roman Catholic

History
- Founded: 1887
- Dedication: St. Paul

Administration
- Archdiocese: Archdiocese of New York

The Chapel of St. Paul is a Roman Catholic parish church under the authority of the Roman Catholic Archdiocese of New York, located in Staatsburg, Dutchess County, New York. It was established in 1887. It is a mission chapel of Church of Regina Coeli in Hyde Park.

== History ==
The first Roman Catholic church in Staatsburgh was a stone structure built in 1849 by Rev. Michael J. Riordan, pastor of St. Peter's, Poughkeepsie, on Clay Hill, on land owned by William Emmett, cousin of New York Attorney General Thomas Addis Emmet. It was served but Father Augustine P. Anderson, O.P., who also visited stations in Ulster and Sullivan counties. However, Father Anderson left for California in 1850.

This church was about two miles from Staatsburg, so a more convenient site was chosen at Staatsburgh, where St. Paul's was built in 1853. The first pastor was Rev. Michael J. Scully. St. Paul's operated as a mission church of St. Joseph's Chapel (Rhinecliff, New York), where Father Scully resided. It subsequently became a mission of Regina Coeli in Hyde Park and remains so.
