= St. Patrick's Chapel (Millerton, New York) =

Coordinates: 41°57′24.9″N 73°30′42.7″W

Chapel of St. Patrick
- Chapel of St. Patrick
- Location: Millerton, New York
- Denomination: Roman Catholic

History
- Founded: 1867
- Dedication: St. Patrick

Administration
- Archdiocese: Archdiocese of New York

The Chapel of St. Patrick was a mission church under the authority of the Roman Catholic Archdiocese of New York, located in Millerton, Dutchess County, New York. It was founded in 1867.

St. Patrick's was a mission church of Immaculate Conception in Amenia, NY. In 1864, Father John Arsenigo, pastor at Croton Falls would say Mass in the homes around Millerton. It was he who purchased the land and started to build the churches in Amenia and Millerton.

Father Arsenigo was succeeded by Father Tandy, who in turn was succeeded by Father F.E. Lavelle. Father Lavelle inherited responsibility for the mission and its $2,000 debt. The debt proved a severe burden for the mission due to the closing of the neighboring mines and furnaces. A substantial portion of the funds were raised by Martin Griffith, who around 1905 penned polite notes to county officials and acquaintances.

Effective November 30, 2017 St. Patrick's Chapel was desacralized for "profane but not sordid use".
