= St. John the Evangelist's Church (Pawling) =

Church of St. John the Evangelist
- Church of St. John the Evangelist
- 41°33′40.3″N 73°35′56.9″W
- Location: 39 East Main Street, Pawling, New York
- Denomination: Roman Catholic
- Website: St. John the Evangelist Church

History
- Founded: 1885
- Dedication: St. John the Evangelist

Architecture
- Functional status: Parish church

Administration
- Archdiocese: Archdiocese of New York

The Church of St. John the Evangelist is a Roman Catholic parish church under the authority of the Roman Catholic Archdiocese of New York, located in Pawling, Dutchess County, New York.

It was established as a mission of Immaculate Conception Church of Amenia in 1869 and elevated to parish status in 1885.

== History ==
The first priest to visit Pawling was Father Cheveau, a French-Canadian, who came about 1848. Previously, at long intervals, Catholics were compelled to journey thirty-two miles to Danbury, Connecticut to hear Mass. Pawling was a branch mission served first by Father Michael Riordan, pastor of St. Peter's, Poughkeepsie; then later by Denis Sheehan, pastor of St. Mary's, Wappingers Falls. During Father Sheehan's tenure Mass was celebrated once a month in turn at various houses, as well as, at Towner's Station, some six miles south of Pawling.

In 1859 Archbishop Hughes appointed Rev. Charles Slevin, as the first resident priest. Father Slevin became responsible for the whole Harlem Valley. He resided at Dover Plains and built the church there. During Father Slevin's tenure, the Civil War broke out, and he was drafted; but the congregation made up the $300 fee to obtain his release and furnish a substitute. Dover Plains was chosen as the headquarters for the missions of Amenia, Beekman, Millbrook, Millerton, and Pawling, where there were no churches. His successor, Rev. John Arsenigo lived in Purdy's Station.

In 1866 Rev. Father Tandy was sent as resident pastor to Amenia, with Dover Plains, Millbrook, Millerton, Pawling, and Sylvan Lake as out missions. Father Tandy celebrated Mass on alternate Sundays in the houses of parishioners in Pawling until 1869 when a church was built. In 1872 this church was destroyed by fire; arson was suspected. In 1877 Rev. Father McSweeney was appointed resident pastor in Pawling with Dover Plains and Sylvan Lake as missions.

In September 2018, Timothy Cardinal Dolan, Archbishop of New York, officially decreed the merger of St. John the Evangelist with St. Charles Borromeo, creating the new parish church of St. John the Evangelist-St. Charles Borromeo. The main parish office is now located in Pawling, NY. Each church retains its own Sunday Mass schedule but is served now under one pastor.
