= Parish of Good Shepherd and St. Joseph (Rhinebeck, New York) =

Church of the Good Shepherd
- 41°55′35″N 73°54′25″W
- Location: 3 Mulberry Street, Rhinebeck, New York
- Denomination: Roman Catholic
- Website: Church of the Good Shepherd

History
- Founded: 1901; 125 years ago

Architecture
- Architectural type: Gothic Revival

Administration
- Archdiocese: Archdiocese of New York

The Parish of Good Shepherd and St. Joseph is a parish under the authority of the Roman Catholic Archdiocese of New York, located in Rhinebeck, Dutchess County, New York. The church address is Good Shepherd Church, 3 Mulberry Street, Rhinebeck, New York 12572

The parish was founded in 1862 with the establishment of St. Joseph's in Rhinecliff. In 1903, St. Joseph's established the mission church of the Good Shepherd in nearby Rhinebeck. Before long it became apparent that the mission in Rhinebeck had the larger congregation. Good Shepherd became a parish in its own right in 1901. The two parishes were then subsequently merged with Good Shepherd being the parish church and St. Joseph's reduced to a dependent chapel.

== Good Shepherd, Rhinebeck ==
Rev. James D. Lennon was pastor of St. Joseph's Church in Rhinecliff from April 7, 1900, to April 1, 1903. During his tenure, he purchased the former Episcopal Church property on the corner of EaSt. Market and Mulberry Streets in Rhinebeck. Built in 1852, that church had proved too small for the congregation and a new Episcopal Church of the Messiah was opened at Montgomery and Chestnut Streets in 1899.

The mission Church of the Good Shepherd was dedicated by Archbishop John Cardinal Farley on March 26, 1903. Although only a mission, it had a much larger congregation than the church at Rhinecliff. It was a mission of St. Joseph's Church (Rhinecliff, New York) from 1901 to 1975, when it became a parish.

The double-height timber church has a three-stage bell tower.

== St. Joseph, Rhinecliff ==
Chapel of St. Joseph
- Chapel of St. Joseph
- Location: Rhinecliff, New York
- Denomination: Roman Catholic

History
- Founded: 1862; 164 years ago
- Dedication: Saint Joseph

Administration
- Archdiocese: Archdiocese of New York

The Chapel of St. Joseph is a Catholic church. parish church under the authority of the Roman Catholic Archdiocese of New York, located in Rhinecliff, Dutchess County, New York. The parish was established in 1862 but around 1975 became a mission church of Good Shepherd Church (Rhinebeck, New York) and remains active.

=== History ===
Prior to 1862, Catholics is the area near Rhinecliff had to cross the river to attend services at St. Mary's in Rondout. St. Joseph's was established in 1862 by Rev. Michael J. Skully to serve Irish Catholic families who settled in Rhinecliff to work on the railroad. Services were initially held at the Starr Institute. The parish included all the area between Poughkeepsie and Hudson, NY. and served as the mother church for the mission churches of Regina Coeli in Hyde Park, St. Paul's Staatsburgh, Sacred Heart Barrytown, and St. Sylvia's in Tivoli.

Originally the intent was to build on the northwest corner of Livingston and Mulberry Streets in Rhinebeck, but the lot was sold when the residents of Rhinecliff objected. In 1863 George Rogers of Tivoli bought six acres in Rhincliff from Charles H. Russell and deeded them to Father Skully for a church and cemetery. The church, built in 1864, was designed by local architect George Veitch, with John Bird as master mason.

In 1888 priests from St. Joseph, Rhinecliff, also tended to a mission church, St. Josephat Clinton Corners, St. Paul's in Staatsburg later became a mission church of Regina Coeli in Hyde Park, and remains so.

=== Pastors ===
- Rev. Michael J. Skully (1862–1872)
- Rev. James Fitzsimmons (1872–1886)
- Rev. William A. O'Neill (1886–1887)
- Rev. Terrence Kelly (1887–1890)
- Rev. Michael J. Murray (1890–1892)
- Rev. James B. Curry (1892–1895)
- Rev. James F. Felton (1895–1900)
- Rev. James D. Lennon (1900–1903)
- Rev. Michael V. Aylward (1903–1910)
- Rev. Michael D. Lennon (1910-1913)
- Rev. Douglas Y. Crawford (2015-2022)
- Rev. Jeffrey Maurer (2022- )

=== Buildings ===
The double-height painted timber church is designed in the native timber Gothic Revival style. The symmetrical five-bay, double-height church has a three-stage tower fronting its forward gable, supporting a shingled needle spire. The tower and nave are flanked to both sides by five-bay lean-to aisles, which terminates distinguishing the final nave bay as the chancel. Windows are pointed stained-glass casements at aisle, and stepped to second stage tower. Rose window to third stage tower. Lozenge-shaped to clerestory.
