= St. Mary - St. Joseph Church (Poughkeepsie, New York) =

Church of St. Mary
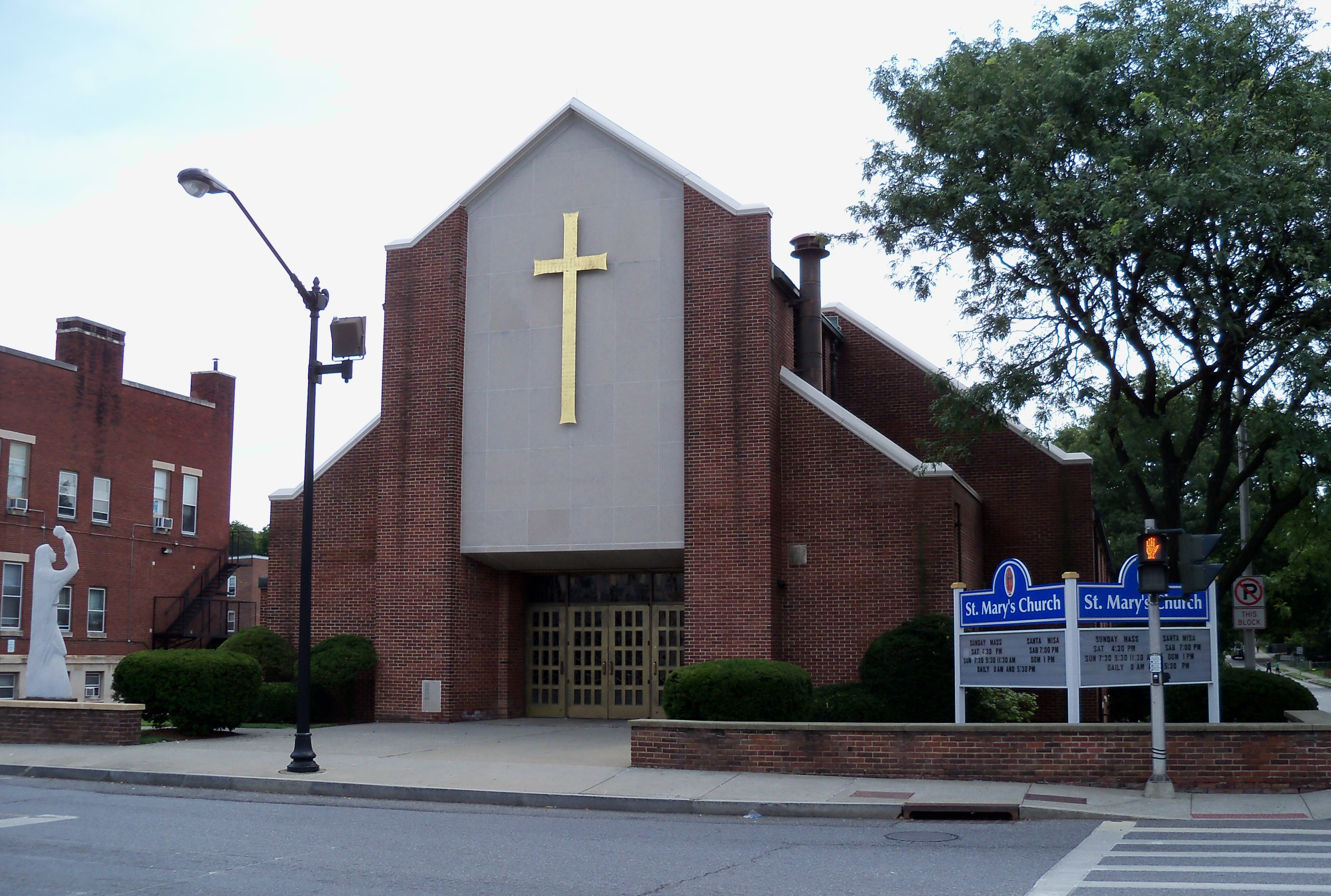
- Church of St. Mary
- 41°42′0.8″N 73°55′26.1″W
- Location: 231 Church Street, Poughkeepsie, New York
- Denomination: Roman Catholic

History
- Founded: 1873

Administration
- Archdiocese: Archdiocese of New York

The Church of St. Mary is a Roman Catholic parish church under the authority of the Roman Catholic Archdiocese of New York, located in Poughkeepsie, Dutchess County, New York. It was established as a parish in 1873. In November 2014, the Archdiocese announced that St. Joseph's Church on Lafayette Place would merge with St. Mary's. Although remaining a church which may be used on special occasions, Masses and the sacraments will no longer be celebrated on a regular weekly basis at St. Joseph's as of August 2015.

== History ==
The congregation was organized in 1873 when the Rev. Patrick McSweeney, D.D., pastor of St. Peter's, Poughkeepsie purchased a former Universalist church building on Cannon St. The church was dedicated on July 20, 1873, by Cardinal McCloskey, and Father McSweeney's brother, the Rev. Dr. Edward McSweeney was appointed pastor. On May 18, 1886, Rev. Terence J. Earley was appointed pastor of St. Mary's. During his pastorate, John McCann, a feed and grain dealer and a founding member of the parish, deeded his property on South Hamilton Street to St. Mary's, and a Gothic-style church built there was dedicated in 1893. A stone which had been removed from Poughkeepsie Bridge, Pier No.2 served as cornerstone, presented by The Bridge Committee. The new church was built and dedicated on October 22, 1893.

The church was destroyed by fire in 1968. Msgr. Matthew J. Cox, pastor of St. Mary's from 1970 to 1982, guided the parish through the four-and-a-half-year process of rebuilding. James McCann, whose father had given the land for the church, died a year after the fire. Before his death, the younger McCann, who had been successful in the stock market, set up a philanthropic foundation. One of its first donations was $330,000 for the new church, which was more than matched by parish donations.

John J. Gartland, an attorney and president of the foundation, salvaged the baptismal font, the only item from the old church still in use. He and his wife also donated a 34-foot-high mosaic of Christ Triumphant that serves as a backdrop to the altar. Incorporated into the mosaic design are the original church and the Mid-Hudson Bridge, which parishioners see as a symbol of their call to build bridges with others and spread the faith. The work was designed by American artist Lumen Martin Winter, who also sculpted the marble statue in front of the church depicting Mary holding the Christ Child above her head.

== Pastors ==
- Edward McSweeny (1873–1885)
- Cornelius Donovan (1885–1887)
- Terence J. Earley (1887–1891)
- Edward J. Conroy (1891–1898)
- Patrick Daly (1899–1914)
- John J. O'Brien (1914–1921)
- Michael D. Lennon (1921–1929)
- James H. McGinnis (1930–1933)
- John J. Moylan (1933–1943)
- James P. Hearon (1943–1964)
- John J. O'Neill (1964–1970)
- Matthew J. Cox (1970–1982)
- Thomas Bergin (1982–1983)
- Harold E. Hicks (1983–1989)
- Philip W. Hill (1989–1994)
- John J. Brinn (1994–2009)
- George Sears (2009–2016)
- Ronald P. Perez (2016-present)

== School ==
A Sunday school was conducted since the early days of the parish. In 1871, an industrial school for girls was established, which gave instruction in sewing, and was supervised by the ladies of the Sunday School. The parish school was erected on Hamilton Street in 1880, staffed by the Sisters of Charity.

== Merger ==
In November 2014, the Archdiocese announced that St. Joseph's Church on Lafayette Place would merge with St. Mary's. Although remaining a church which may be used on special occasions, Masses and the sacraments will no longer be celebrated on a regular weekly basis at St. Joseph's as of August 2015.

== St. Joseph's ==
Church of St. Joseph
- Church of St. Joseph
- Location: 9 Lafayette Place, Poughkeepsie, New York
- Denomination: Roman Catholic

History
- Founded: 1900

Administration
- Archdiocese: Archdiocese of New York

In 1893 members of the Polish community in Poughkeepsie formed the Joseph Society. At that time they attended the Church of the Nativity on Union Street, which had been founded in 1852 to serve the German community. In 1897 the Maria of Czenstochan Society was formed, whose members attended St. Peter's on Mill St. In 1900 the societies joined to form their own parish with assistance of Rev. Franz Fabian, pastor of Immaculate Conception, the Polish church at Rondout. The building, a former Baptist church, was purchased from the Germania Singing Society. The first Mass was celebrated on March 17, 1901, by Father Fabian. The following October, Cardinal John Murphy Farley appointed Father Charles Galuzka, Father Fabian's assistant in Rondout, as the first pastor. During his tenure, a building was purchased for a rectory. Father Galuzka was followed by Rev. Ignatius Bialdyga, former pastor of St. Anthony's on Staten Island. In 1914 Rev. Theodore Jozwiak from Immaculate Conception in Rondout was appointed pastor of St. Joseph's.
