= Parish of St. Christopher and St. Sylvia (Red Hook, New York) =

Church of St. Christopher
- Church of St. Christopher
- 41°59′32.6″N 73°52′43.6″W
- Location: 7411 South Broadway, Red Hook, New York
- Denomination: Roman Catholic
- Website: St. Christopher's Church

History
- Founded: 1975

Architecture
- Functional status: Parish church

Administration
- Archdiocese: Archdiocese of New York

The Parish of St. Christopher and St. Sylvia is a parish under the authority of the Roman Catholic Archdiocese of New York, located in Red Hook, Dutchess County, New York. In November 2014, the Archdiocese of New York announced that the parish of St. Sylvia's Church in Tivoli, New York would merge with St. Christopher's. Although it would remain a church which may be used on special occasions, Masses and the sacraments will no longer be celebrated on a regular weekly basis at St. Sylvia's as of August 2015.

== St. Christopher, Red Hook ==
St. Christopher Church was founded as a mission of Sacred Heart Parish in Barrytown in 1910, and elevated to parish status in 1975. Sacred Heart parish was established in 1875 in Barrytown to serve immigrants settling in the area. As the area developed and the population grew, the little church could not hold all the Catholics who wanted to come to Mass. Hazardous travel conditions again played a role: Improved transportation had led to settlement farther inland, and the trip to Barrytown was difficult and even dangerous in winter. For a while the parish used a local theater for Sunday Mass. In 1925 it purchased property and laid the cornerstone for St. Christopher's Church, which was dedicated in 1926. When plans were under way to build St. Christopher's Church in Red Hook, parishioners hauled stones from their own yards and fields for its exterior walls.

The parish school, staffed by Sparkhill Dominican Sisters, opened in 1962, but chronic low enrollment caused it to close in 1985; the school building, now the parish center, houses the religious education program. Holy Spirit Chapel is in the parish center. Its stained-glass windows depict the evangelists, St. John Bosco, St. Maria Goretti, and four American saints: SS. Frances Xavier Cabrini, Elizabeth Ann Seton, John Neumann, Blessed Kateri Tekakwitha. Special Masses, Confirmation Class retreats and other events take place there.

=== Pastors ===
Pastors who served St. Christopher's in Red Hook and the parish from which it developed, Sacred Heart in Barrytown, are:

- Rev. James Fitzsimmons, 1875–1885
- Rev. William J. McClure, 1886–1893
- Rev. Daniel J. Cronin, 1893–1899
- Rev. Hugh P. Cullum, 1899–1901
- Rev. Matthew J.F. Scanlon, 1901–1919
- Rev. Joseph B. Cherry, 1919–1922
- Rev. P. McAleer, 1922–1923
- Rev. Cornelius Fitzsimmons, 1924–1932
- Rev. John Kenny, 1932–1937
- Rev. Louis A. Jaudas, 1937–1940
- Rev. John A. Walsh, 1941
- Rev. Msgr. John R. Carroll, 1941–1969
- Rev. Hugh Devers, 1969–1974
- Rev. Theodore J. Schulz, 1974–1980
- Rev. Louis J. Mazza, 1980–1986
- Rev. Msgr. Charles P. Coen, 1986–2008
- Rev. Patrick F. Buckley, 2011–2021
- Rev. Douglas Y. Crawford, 2021–2022
- Rev. Jeffrey Maurer, 2023–present

== Merger ==
In November 2014, the Archdiocese of New York announced that St. Sylvia's Church in Tivoli, New York would merge with St. Christopher's. Although remaining a church which may be used on special occasions, Masses and the sacraments will no longer be celebrated on a regular weekly basis at St. Sylvia's as of August 2015.

== St. Sylvia, Tivoli ==
Church of St. Sylvia
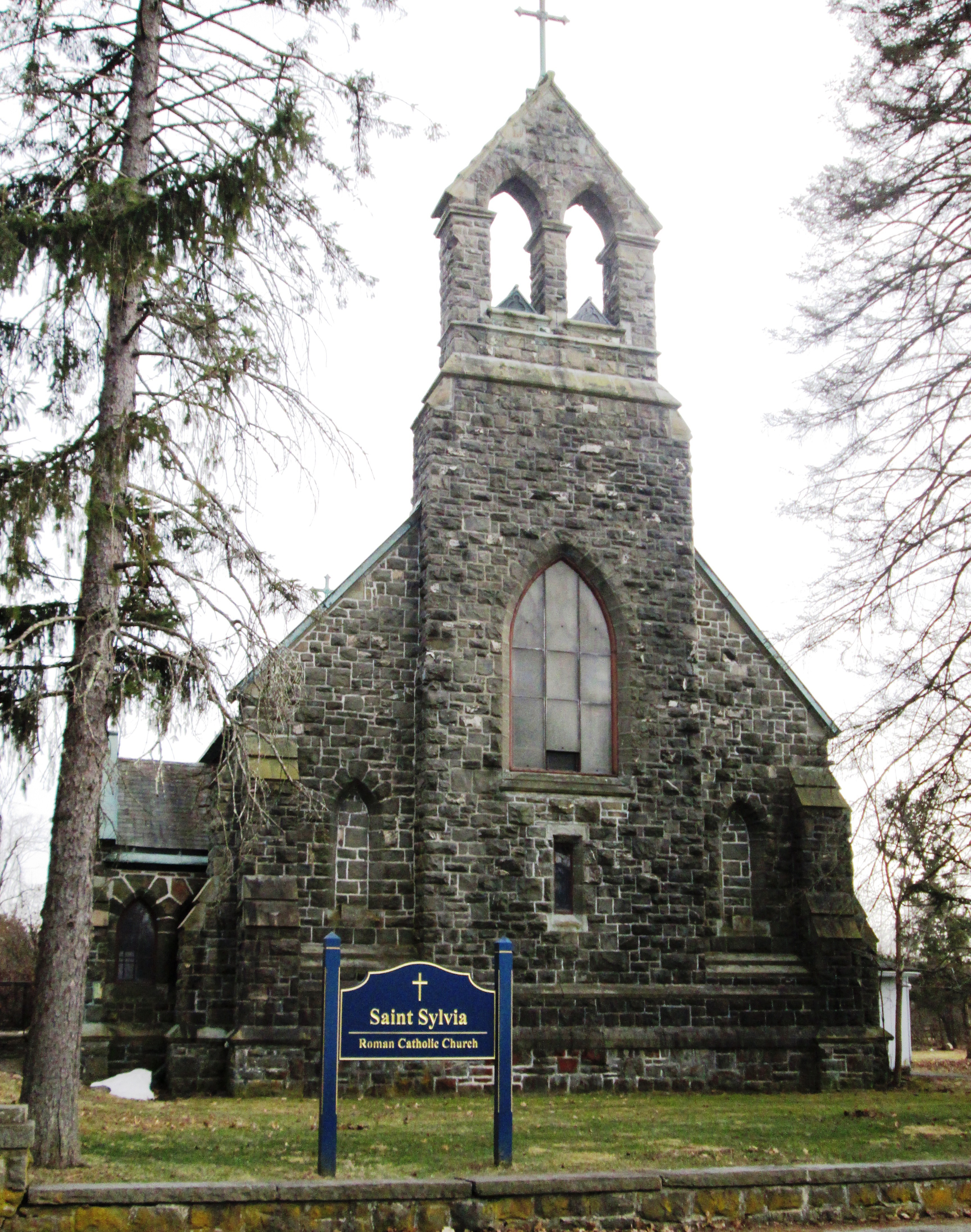
- (2019)
- Church of St. Sylvia
- Location: Tivoli, New York
- Denomination: Roman Catholic

History
- Founded: 1890
- Dedication: St. Sylvia

Administration
- Archdiocese: Archdiocese of New York

The Church of St. Sylvia is a Roman Catholic parish church under the authority of the Roman Catholic Archdiocese of New York, located in Tivoli, Dutchess County, New York. The parish was established in 1890.

=== History ===
Tivoli's first Catholics were Irish and German, and arrived in 1852. Mass was said in their homes by Rev. Michael C. Powers of Saugerties, until the first church, a small wooden building, was constructed. After Father Powers, Fathers Michael Scully and Fitzsimmons of Rhinebeck tended the mission. In 1886, Tivoli became a mission of Barrytown, and in 1890 it was made a parish. Since February 2009, St. Sylvia's has celebrated Mass in both authorized forms of the Roman Rite, the ordinary and the extraordinary.

=== Pastors ===
- Rev. James Fenton
- Rev. Michael Reinhardt
- Rev. P.F. Maughan
- Rev. Lenes
- Rev. J.H. Dooley
- Rev. Charles Joseph Parks
- Rev. Geissler
- Rev. Alfred Croke

The old church was replaced by a new memorial church and rectory in 1902 as a gift from Countess Carola de Laugier-Villars and her sister, Mrs. Geraldyn Redmond, in memory of their mother. The new stone church was consecrated on June 28, 1903, by Cardinal Farley.

The parish school, also a memorial gift, was established in 1888. At one time St. Sylvia Church sponsored a cottage lace industry.

In 2015, the parish of St. Sylvia in Tivoli was merged with St. Christopher's Church in Red Hook.
