= St. Mary's Church (Wappingers Falls, New York) =

Church of St. Mary
- Church of St. Mary
- 41°36′17″N 73°55′23″W
- Location: 11 Clinton Street, Wappingers Falls, New York
- Denomination: Roman Catholic
- Website: St. Mary's Church

History
- Founded: 1845

Architecture
- Architectural type: English Gothic
- Groundbreaking: 1877
- Completed: 1879

Administration
- Archdiocese: Archdiocese of New York

The Church of St. Mary is a Catholic parish under the authority of the Archdiocese of New York, located in Wappingers Falls, Dutchess County, New York. It was canonically established in 1845.

== History ==
=== Early days ===
The first Catholics in the area then known as Channingville, were Irish and arrive around 1810. In those days, the spiritual needs of the local Catholic community were met by priests riding circuit out of St. Peter's in Poughkeepsie, which was founded in 1837. Tradition names Father Miles Maxwell as one of the first priests to minister to Catholics in the vicinity of Wappingers Falls. At that time, Mass was offered about once a month at the home of Mr. John Murray on Clinton Street near Pells Place. In 1841, a small frame church was built. Other priests who came into the Wappingers Falls area were Father Farrell, Father Sullivan, Father John Smith, and Father Michael Riordan, pastor of St. Peter's.

In the summer of 1844 Father Sylvester Malone celebrated his first Mass in the mission church of St. Mary's. Malone and his friend architect Patrick Keely would later be responsible for the construction a number of churches throughout the archdiocese.

In 1845 a parish, known as St. Mary's of Channingville, was founded to serve southern Dutchess County. In 1846 the Clinton Mill at Wappingers Falls was in the process of being built and soon after, the Hudson River Railroad was begun through this locality. These enterprises attracted many Irish and Italian immigrants to the area both as employees in the mill and as laborers on the railroad. Cholera was prevalent among the railroad workers and the presence of a resident priest became increasingly important. Archbishop John Hughes of New York sent Father J. Scollon. Being called to High Point (New Hamburg), Father Scollon labored unceasingly to relieve the sick and the dying. Father Scollon's tireless service during his year-and-a-half stay at St. Mary's impressed itself upon the hearts and memories of the community. Rev. George Brophy was assigned as the first resident pastor in 1850.

==== Mission parishes ====
St.Mary's began as a mission church of St. Peter's in Poughkeepsie, but before long was serving mission parishes of its own. George Brophy's parish extended from Poughkeepsie to Cold Spring. As pastor, Father Brophy divided his labors among St. Mary's Wappingers, the ore beds at Sylvan Lake in Beekman, and Fishkill Landing. Anyone who wished to hear Mass more than once a month had to travel to where the priest was that week. People wishing to receive Communion had to fast from midnight and folks coming in from Sylvan Lake often brought a loaf of bread in their pockets to sustain them on the long way home.

Rev. Denis Sheehan succeeded Father Brophy as pastor of Wappingers Falls, Fishkill Village, Sylvan Lake and the Beekman area in 1853. He was also responsible for ministering to the mission parishes in Fishkill Landing and Matteawan until the foundation in 1857 of what eventually became St. Joachim's in Beacon. It is reported that in winter, priests from Wappinger used to walk across the frozen Hudson River to say Mass in Marlboro and Milton.

=== 19th century ===
Denis Sheehan was a great temperance man and organized St. Mary's Total Abstinence and Benefit Society which had a membership of 175 by the time of his death. This was a period of great growth in Wappinger and saw the founding of the first newspaper, the library, Drake School (the present VFW Hall), the Garner and Johnson Fire Companies, the establishment of Sweet Orr and Company, eighteen saloons, and the incorporation of the village. Father Sheehan died on October 27, 1875, and was buried in St. Mary's cemetery. On the day of his funeral, all the factories in Wappinger closed down and everyone turned out to honor him, including officials of the Garner Print Works.

In July 1876, Father Charles M. O'Keeffe took charge of the parish and began construction of a new church to replace the original structure, which despite repeated additions, had become too small for the growing congregation. The excavation of the cellar was done by men of the parish under the leadership of Mr. James Campbell, a stonemason. Much of the stone was taken from a small quarry on Fulton Street. In appreciation, Father O'Keeffe placed their names in the cornerstone of the church with other records. The cornerstone was laid Saturday, September 27, 1877, by Cardinal John McCloskey. A popular and gifted administrator, O'Keeffe was elected a director of the Wappingers Savings Bank on January 26, 1877, second Vice President in January 1878, and first vice president in January 1880, a position he held until being transferred in 1885 to St. Charles Borromeo in New York City. The parish's certificate of incorporation was given on November 15, 1883. The first lay trustees were Peter Downey and William T. O'Rourke.

==== Michael Power ====
Fathers Sheehan, O'Keefe, and Mahoney were assisted by Father Michael C. Power from Cork, Ireland. Power had been pastor in Saugerties from 1852 to 1878, where he served the people working in the stone quarries. He built a church at Quarryville, where it was not uncommon to find one hundred men led by their foreman, marching eight to ten miles to attend Mass. In 1878 Father Power retired to Wappingers Falls to help his friend and classmate, Father Sheehan. Father Power served as a missionary priest to families in Stoneco and other outlying areas. He made quite an impression on his rounds, riding in on his horse from Sylvan Lake with his black cape billowing behind him. Father Power owned a tract of land on West Main Street just south of the Wappingers Rural Cemetery. This land, known as Power's Park, was enclosed by a board fence and contained a grandstand from which spectators could watch bicycle races which were run on a 1/4 mile track. This park was also the home field of the Wappingers Monitors baseball team and was the site of some of Dan Brouthers' most memorable hits. The local Ancient Order of Hibernians held their annual picnic there after they moved from O'Farrell's Point.

=== 20th century ===
It was during the tenure of Father James Corridan's tenure that Catherine McCloskey had a grotto built between the church and school.

Monsignor John J. Loughlin became pastor in 1928 and served for thirty-six years, through the Great Depression and the growth and prosperity that followed World War II. During his tenure, the parish, taking in 18 square miles, grew to about 6,000 parishioners. Monsignor Loughlin died on November 17, 1964, at the age of ninety. Loughlin had been chaplain of the Knights of Columbus for thirty-six years. When the Knights relocated from the old K of C building on West Main Street to the former Central Hudson Gas and Electric Co. building at the east end of the bridge, they dedicated the new meeting hall to Monsignor Loughlin.

Rev. Monsignor Charles B. Brennan was next appointed pastor of St. Mary's. When he first came to Wappinger, Monsignor's duties as chief chaplain for the 42nd Infantry (Rainbow) Division necessitated his commuting to New York City for drills and Sunday Masses in the division's armory at 34th and Park Avenue. Prior to becoming division chaplain with the rank of lieutenant colonel, Monsignor Brennan served in the Pacific with the 25th division and was awarded the Bronze Star. As pastor of Our Lady of Loretto on the Lower East Side of Manhattan, he became well known for his work on behalf of homeless men at the Holy Name Center on Bleecker Street. Monsignor also served for a time as Archdiocesan Director of the Holy Name Societies.

The church endured a renovation during the latter 20th century which involved major changes to the sanctuary including the removal of the high altar and altar rail.

=== 21st century ===
Monsignor Francis Bellew saw the church move into the 21st century and raised funds to for a further extensive renovation in 2001 shortly after the parish celebrated its 150th anniversary. Under Fr. James Cruz, the school was incorporated in the Archdiocesan Regional System and the growing Spanish-speaking community of Wappingers Falls was integrated into parish life with liturgies and catechetical programs.

== Description ==
The church is English Gothic in design with finely worked North River blue stone trim and was built at a cost of approximately $30,000. When constructed, its spire was 145 feet high, but it was struck by lightning in 1894 and later replaced by a crown. Father O'Keeffe donated the stained glass nativity scene above the main altar. The rose window above the choir loft was donated by St. Mary's Temperance Society.

== Pastors ==
- Rev. Sullivan (1841–1850)
- Rev. George Brophy (1850–1853) - appointed pastor of St. Paul Church at 117th Street in Harlem.
- Rev. Denis Sheehan (1853–1875)
- Rev. Hugh O'Hare (1875)
- Rev. Hogan (1875–1876)
- Rev. Charles M. O'Keefe (1876–1885)
- Rev. Cornelius B. Mahony, D.D. (1885–1903)
- Rev. Charles F. Reid (1903–1912)
- Rev. James Corridan (1912–1921)
- Rev. John P. Hines (1921–1928)
- Monsignor John J. Loughlin (1928–1964)
- Monsignor Charles B. Brennan (1964–1983)
- Rev. Joseph W. Hickey (1983–1992)
- Rev Donald Licata (1992–1993)
- Monsignor Francis Bellew (1993–2014)
- Rev. James Cruz (2014–2016)
- Rev. Daniel D'Alliessi (2016–2022)
- Bishop Gerardo Colacicco (2022–present)

== School ==
The first St. Mary's School was built in 1893. It was located where the present gymnasium now stands and was staffed by the Sisters of Charity.

A new seventeen classroom school building was opened in 1956 and dedicated by Cardinal Spellman. By the mid-2000s the sisters were no longer actively involved in teaching in the school. In 2013, the Archdiocese's Regional School system took over the running and financing of the school. Declining enrollment and rising costs led to the Archdiocese's decision to close the school in June 2019.

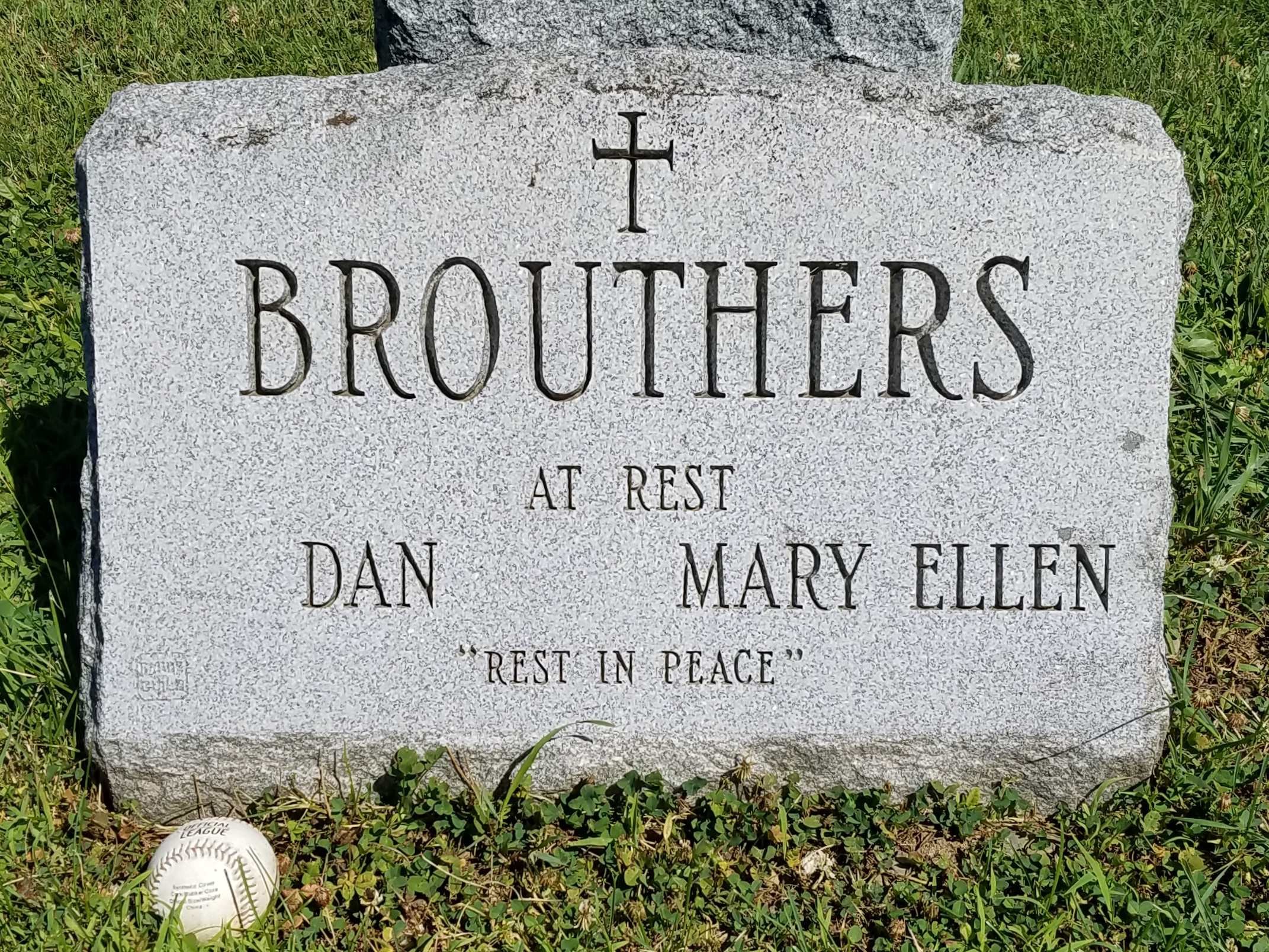
Dan Brouthers' grave in the church's cemetery

In 2023, the school reopened, with enrolling students in Pre-K, kindergarten and one class at the elementary level.

== Cemetery ==
The parish cemetery is the resting place for the mortal remains of many parishioners including baseball slugger, Dan Brouthers, and Christopher Lynch, a Union soldier who died October 31, 1861, due to wounds incurred at the Battle of Antietam. Father Joseph Gilmore, once a parishioner of St. Mary's, is also buried, there, having become the first priest from New York to die in World War II (at Anzio).
