= Church of St. Mary, Mother of the Church (Fishkill, New York) =

Building in Fishkill, New York, United States

Coordinates: 41°32′6.44″N 73°54′34.23″W

The Church of St. Mary, Mother of the Church
- Interactive map of the The Church of St. Mary, Mother of the Church area

General information
- Location: Fishkill, New York, United States
- Client: Roman Catholic Archdiocese of New York

The Church of St. Mary, Mother of the Church is a Roman Catholic parish church under the authority of the Roman Catholic Archdiocese of New York, located in Fishkill, Dutchess County, New York. It was originally established as a mission of St. Joachim (Beacon, New York) in 1861, and elevated to parish status in 1953.

== Pastors ==
- Monsignor Francis McKeon (1953-1964)
- Monsignor Bernard Fleming (1964-1981)
- Monsignor Charles P. Quinn (1982-1994)
- Monsignor Joseph Martin (1994 - 2013)
- Father Joseph A. Blenkle (2013 - 2025)
- Fr. Hartley Bancroft (2025–present)
