= Sacred Heart Chapel (Barrytown, New York) =

Coordinates: 41°59′56.0″N 73°55′28.5″W

The Chapel of the Sacred Heart
- Interactive map of the The Chapel of the Sacred Heart area

General information
- Location: Barrytown, New York, United States of America
- Construction started: 1875
- Client: Roman Catholic Archdiocese of New York

The Chapel of the Sacred Heart was a Roman Catholic parish church under the authority of the Roman Catholic Archdiocese of New York, located in Barrytown, Dutchess County, New York City. It was established in 1886 as a parish; formerly a mission of St. Joseph in Rhinecliff. It was suppressed as a parish ca. 1975.

== History ==
The Sacred Heart Church and Cemetery were established in the late 1800s to accommodate the Irish Catholic population who were employed on the railroads and large estates in Barrytown and the surrounding hamlets. Prior to a Catholic church in Barrytown, the residents of the area attended services across the river in Kingston and Saugerties. People would walk across the frozen river in winter or cross by boat in other seasons, weather permitting. Walter V. Miller in "A Parish History" tells of an old tale: "The account has it that, on one occasion, a boat and its occupants thereof narrowly missed playing the leading role in a very tragic incident, this happening, strange as it may seem, played a very large part in establishing of the first church at Barrytown instead of Red Hook." Apparently, some members of the Donaldson family of Edgewater were on that boat. The Donaldson family donated the land for the church and cemetery at Barrytown.

The cornerstone of the church was laid by Rev. Thomas S. Preston on October 17, 1875. Barrytown was a mission attended from St. Joseph's in Rhinecliff, by pastor James Fitzsimmons, until 1886 when Archbishop Corrigan appointed Rev. William J. McClure resident rector. The first burial in the Cemetery was November 23, 1886. The rectory was built in 1887. St. Christopher's in Red Hook began as a mission station of Sacred Heart Parish.

== Pastors ==
- Father William J. McClure, 1886-1893
- Father Daniel J. Cronin, 1893-1899
- Father Hugh P. Cullum, 1899-1901
- Father Matthew J.F. Scanlon, 1901-1919
- Father Joseph B. Cherry, 1919-1922
- Father P. McAleer, 1922-1923
- Father Cornelius Fitzsimmons, 1924-1932
- Father John R. Carroll, 1941-1969
