= St. Joachim and St. John the Evangelist's Church (Beacon, New York) =

Church of St. Joachim and St. John the Evangelist
- Church of St. Joachim and St. John the Evangelist
- 41.509828°N 73.973614°W
- Location: Beacon, New York
- Denomination: Roman Catholic
- Website: Sts. Joachim and John the Evangelist Church

History
- Founded: 1857
- Dedication: St. Joachim; St. John the Evangelist

Administration
- Archdiocese: Archdiocese of New York

The Church of St. Joachim and St. John the Evangelist is a Roman Catholic parish church under the authority of the Roman Catholic Archdiocese of New York, located in Beacon, Dutchess County, New York. It was established after a parish mergers of the Church of St. Joachim, (Beacon, New York) and St. John the Evangelist (Beacon, New York). The merged parishes share a pastor, clergy and administrative staff, and the two church buildings continued to be used for worship.

== History ==
The parish of St. Joachim, in what was then the village of Matteawan, began in 1845 as an out-mission of St. Mary's in Wappingers Falls. At the time, it also included the area of the adjacent village of Fishkill Landing. Fishkill Landing grew such that it was deemed advisable that a second parish be formed. St. John the Evangelist was founded in 1887. Although the villages merged in 1913 to form the City of Beacon, the parishes remained separate and independent until they too merged in 2004.

=== The Early Church in Dutchess County ===
The first recorded Catholic Mass in the Beacon, NY area was celebrated at Mt. Gulian during the Revolutionary War by a French priest from Rhode Island. The first resident pastor in Dutchess County was Rev. John Maginnis at St. Peter's in Poughkeepsie in 1837. St. Patrick's in Newburgh had been established in 1838, the first Catholic Church in Orange County. A number of residents in this area attended Mass at St. Patrick's in Newburgh as a matter of convenience.

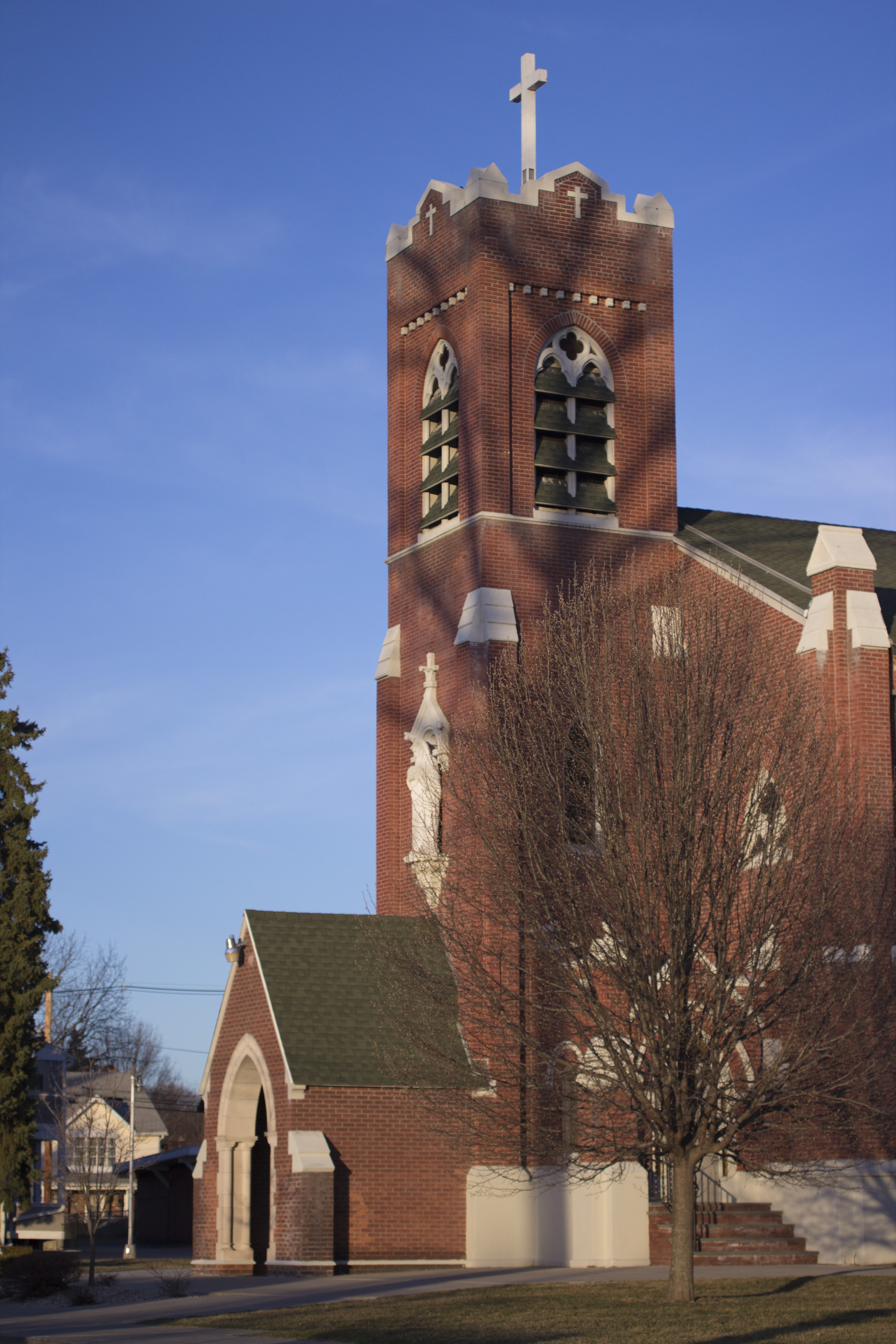
St. Joachim's Church, Leonard St.

=== St. Joachim's ===
St. Mary's in Wappingers Falls was established in 1845 as a mission of St. Peter's, Poughkeepsie. That same year, a Father Sullivan celebrated the first Mass in Matteawan. Rev. Denis Sheehan pastor of St. Mary's laid the groundwork for a new parish in the Fishkill Landing-Matteawan area and is considered the first pastor of St. Joachim's. He purchased property for a new church in Matteawan in 1855. The church was enclosed in 1857 and Mass has been said there ever since. In the fall of 1860 Rev James Coyle became the first resident pastor in Matteawan. the parish included congregations in Fishkill Landing, Low Point, and the village of Fishkill. The church was dedicated in 1861. In 1877 Father John C. Henry became pastor of St. Joachim's. Father Henry founded a parochial school, introduced the Sisters of Charity to teach there, enlarged the church and rectory, and paid off considerable debt. St. Joachim's held a year-long celebration of its 150 anniversary from December 2002 through December 2003.

==== Mission parishes ====
In 1861, Fr. Coyle established a mission church, St. Mary's, in Fishkill which was dedicated in October 1864. It remained a mission church for 92 years until Cardinal Spellman established it as a separate parish in 1953.

To meet the increasing needs in the area, Rev. Terrence Kelly, pastor 1890–1900, established a mission church, St. Francis, in Timoneyville (now Dutchess Junction) in 1899. Francis Timoney owned four brickyards between Verplanck Point and Brockway, and built a church for the workers. St. Francis closed as a mission church in 1928 with the dwindling number of workers in the brickyards and the building was dismantled.

He was the first Catholic priest to offer Mass in Matteawan State Hospital, which came under the care of St. Joachim's in 1892. This meant that St. Joachim's now had three mission churches; St. Mary's in Fishkill, St. Francis in Timoneyville and Matteawan State Hospital. In 1924, priests from St. Joachim's began saying Mass in the Veterans’ Hospital at Castle Point.

==== St. Joachim's School ====
A parochial school began in 1861. The Sisters of Charity of Mt. St. Vincent began teaching in the school in 1883. The Sisters of Charity served St. Joachim's School for just over 100 years, ending in 1984.

==== Pastors ====
- Rev. Denis Sheehan (1853–1860)
- Rev. James Coyle (1860–1867)
- Rev. Christopher O'Farrell (1867–1871)
- Rev. Peter McCourt (1871–1876)
- Rev. John C. Henry (1877–1884)
- Rev. Michael J. McSwiggan (1884–1890)
- Rev. Terrence F. Kelly (1890–1900)
- Rev. John Briody (1900–1910)
- Rev. Michael V. Aylward (1910–1921)
- Rev. Thomas B. Dougherty (1921–1934)
- Rev. James A. Cassidy (1934–1953)
- Rev. John M. Nicholas (1953–1959)
- Rev. James F. Tully (1959–1964)
- Rev. Richard A. Luedke (1964–1982)
- Rev. John P. Larkin (1982–1983)
- Rev. Thomas J. Moran (1983–1984)
- Rev. Donald J. Poulin (1985–1996)

=== St.John the Evangelist ===
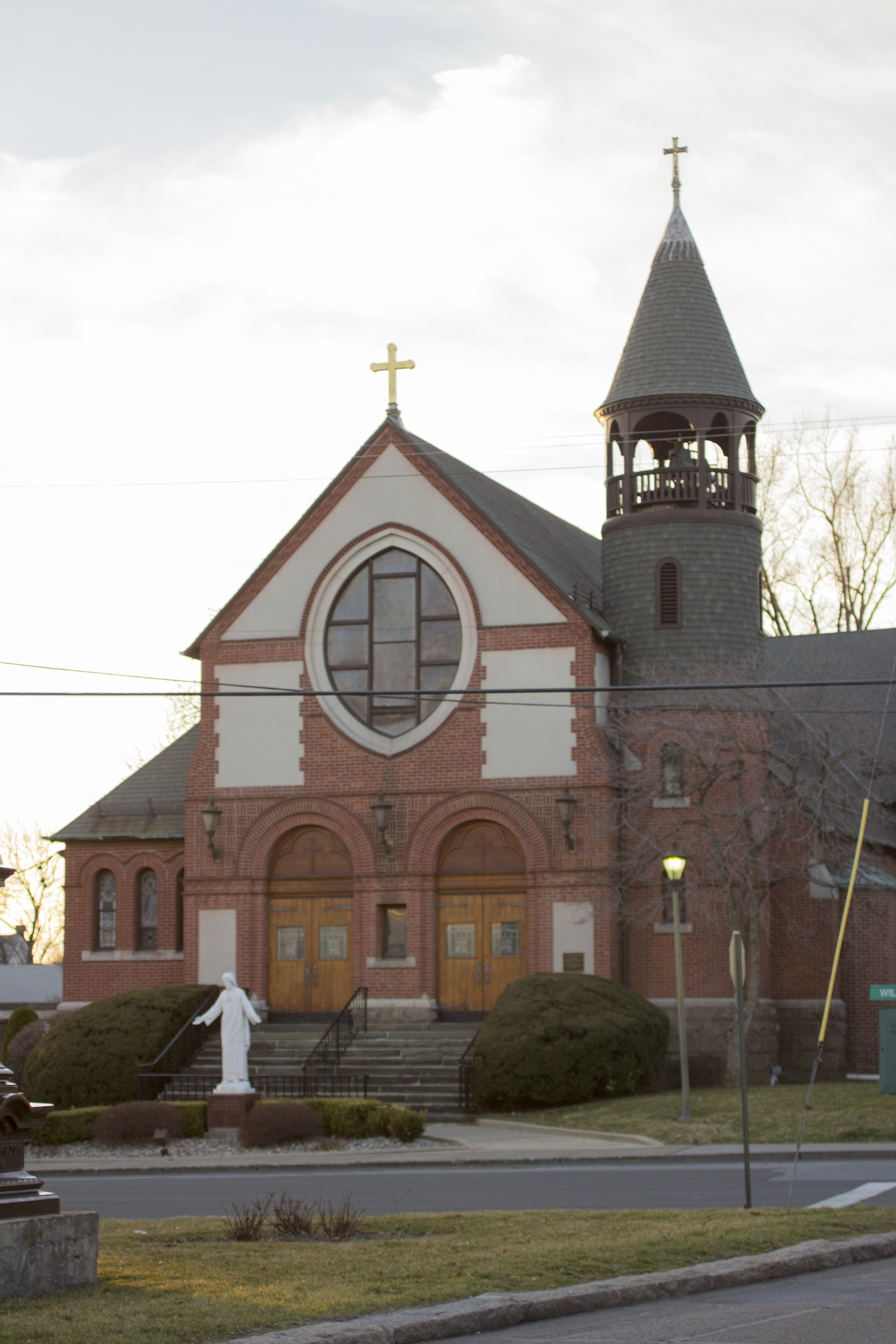
St. John the Evangelist's Church, Willow St.

The church at Fishkill Landing began as a mission of St. Mary's in Wappingers Falls, but was later transferred to St. Joachim's in Matteawan. The parish was formed in 1887. Rev. John Hurley was appointed as the first pastor. The first Mass was celebrated on that Christmas. The original St. John's Church was the old Swift's Hall. It was dedicated by Archbishop Corrigan in 1888, but burned to the ground in 1890. After the former opera house burned services were held for a time, in a printing-office and later over a livery stable. The "Elm Tree" property was purchased from Lewis Tompkins for the new church. Rev. John J. McGrath was appointed in 1890. The present St. John's Church was built in 1891.

==== St. John's School ====
The Sisters of Charity from Matteawan conducted Sunday School until 1909 when a school was built at St. John's. The Sisters of Mercy initially staffed the new school, followed by the Sisters of Charity of Mt. St. Vincent until 1943 when the School Sisters of St. Francis replaced them. The school was renovated, expanded and rededicated by Cardinal Spellman in 1951. The St. Joachim and St. John's schools merged in 1990 and closed in 2001.

==== Pastors ====
- Rev. John A. Hurley (1887–1890)
- Rev. John J. McGrath (1890–1910)
- Rev. James N. Aylward (1910–1919)
- Rev. J.S. Prendergast (1919–1936)
- Rev. Charles D. Breslin (1936–1941)
- Rev. James A. Dunnigan (1941–1945)
- Rev. J. M. Madden (1948–1952)
- Rev. Hubert Beller (1952–1970)
- Rev. Martin Connelly (1970–1982)
- Rev. Thomas J. Philips (1983–1984)
- Rev. Martin Connelly (1984–1995)
- Rev. Joseph F. Bisignano (1995–2003)

== Hispanic Ministry ==
St. John's Parish began ministering to the increasing number of Spanish-speaking people in this area when Rev. Robert Carden (1957–1961) became the first Spanish-speaking priest assigned to the parish specifically to minister to the growing Puerto Rican population in Beacon. Mass began to be offered regularly in Spanish in the lower hall. Rev. Rogelio Cuesta, O.P., Director of the Newburgh – Beacon Spanish Apostolate, ministered to the Spanish speaking community from 1972 to 1978. He was assisted by sisters of the Daughters of Jesus order. Fr. Fenlon was assisted in the Spanish Apostolate by the sisters of the Daughters of Divine Love.

== Merger ==
The two parishes in Beacon were officially combined into one parish effective January 2, 2004, with Fr. Bisignano as pastor. To provide for additional priests for the parish, an agreement with the Diocese of Auchi in Nigeria provides two priests of that diocese to serve in the parish for as part of their development.

=== Pastors ===
- Rev. Joseph F. Bisignano (2004–2005)
- Rev. David E. Nolan (2005–2011)
- Rev. Richard G. Smith (2011–present)

== Current Pastoral Staff ==
- Rev. Richard G. Smith
- Fr. Innocent Nwachukwu
- Deacon Martin Mayeski
- Deacon Oscar Cifuentes
- Rev. Gill Babeu
- Sr. Kathleen Maire

== St. Joachim's cemetery ==
The old cemetery was opened in 1866 and was enlarged in 1925. 1865: Rev. James Coyle purchased the first land for St. Joachim's Cemetery. Between 1884 and 1890, Rev. Michael McSwiggan, pastor, purchased additional ground for the cemetery from Henry and Julia Wolcott. In 1886 the remains of Rev. Peter McCourt, fourth pastor were transferred to the cemetery. He had originally been buried in the churchyard in 1876. In 1925 the cemetery was enlarged and an iron fence installed on three sides under Rev. Thomas B. Dougherty.

The first land for the new cemetery was purchased in 1928 by Fr. Dougherty, with his own money. He purchased about 13 acres of land from the Ursulines on the northeast edge of the city for the new cemetery and donated the land to the church. The first burial in the new cemetery took place in 1931. Fr. Dougherty was buried in the priests’ plot in the "old" cemetery having died suddenly of a heart attack while sitting down to dinner on Sunday, September 9, 1934.

Between 1964 and 1982, Rev. (later Monsignor) Richard Luedke designed the "new" cemetery and had the garage and office built on the property. A new section of 120 plots for veterans was opened in the cemetery in 1979. There are also two separate plots reserved for veterans near the top of the hill in the cemetery.
