= St. Joseph - Immaculate Conception Church (Millbrook, New York) =

St. Joseph - Immaculate Conception
- St. Joseph - Immaculate Conception
- 41°47′10.4″N 73°41′49.2″W
- Location: 15 North Avenue, Millbrook, New York
- Denomination: Roman Catholic
- Website: St. Joseph - Immaculate Conception Church

History
- Founded: 1889
- Dedication: St. Joseph

Architecture
- Functional status: Parish church

Administration
- Archdiocese: Archdiocese of New York

The St. Joseph - Immaculate Conception Catholic Church is a Roman Catholic parish church under the authority of the Roman Catholic Archdiocese of New York, located in Millbrook, Dutchess County, New York.

== St. Joseph ==
In 1859, Catholics in Millbrook were attended by Rev. Charles Slevin out of Dover Plains. In 1864, Slevin was assigned to Yonkers, and the parish at Dover with its mission churches was attached to Croton Falls, where Rev. John Arsenigo was pastor. In 1868, Rev. Patrick w. Tandy became the first resident pastor of Immaculate Conception Church in Amenia. St. Joseph's became a mission of Amenia in 1870, and was elevated to parish status in 1889. The first pastor was E.M. Byrne. St. Joseph's Church was built in 1872.

During Rev. Byrne's administration a former Baptist church building was purchased in Bangall and refitted as the mission Church of the Immaculate Conception. It was served by priests from St. Joseph's, as was the mission at Oak Summit. Upon the death of Byrne in 1892, Rev. John Weir became pastor.

St. Joseph's also had charge of a mission chapel, also known as St. Joseph's, in Clinton Corners.

== Mergers ==
The Archdiocese of New York announced that the parishes of Immaculate Conception in Bangall, NY and St. Joseph in Clinton Corners, NY would merge with St. Joseph's Millbrook. Although remaining churches which may be used on special occasions, Masses and the sacraments will no longer be celebrated on a regular weekly basis at either as of August 2015. Upon the request of the pastor of the new consolidated parish, Timothy Cardinal Dolan, Archbishop of New York, by a decree dated 30 June 2017, declared the Immaculate Conception church building be deconsecrated due to "the dangerous condition of the church building, the immense financial burden to retain and maintain the building, and the lack of parochial resources". A second decree issued the same day designated the Chapel of St. Joseph in Clinton Corners to be likewise relegated.

With the 2015 merger of Immaculate Conception Church in Bangall, and St. Joseph's Chapel in Clinton Corners, St. Joseph - Immaculate Conception Church underwent significant restoration in 2017. Work included extensive painting, replacement of the flooring, and updated lighting.

== Immaculate Conception (Bangall) ==
Church of the Immaculate Conception
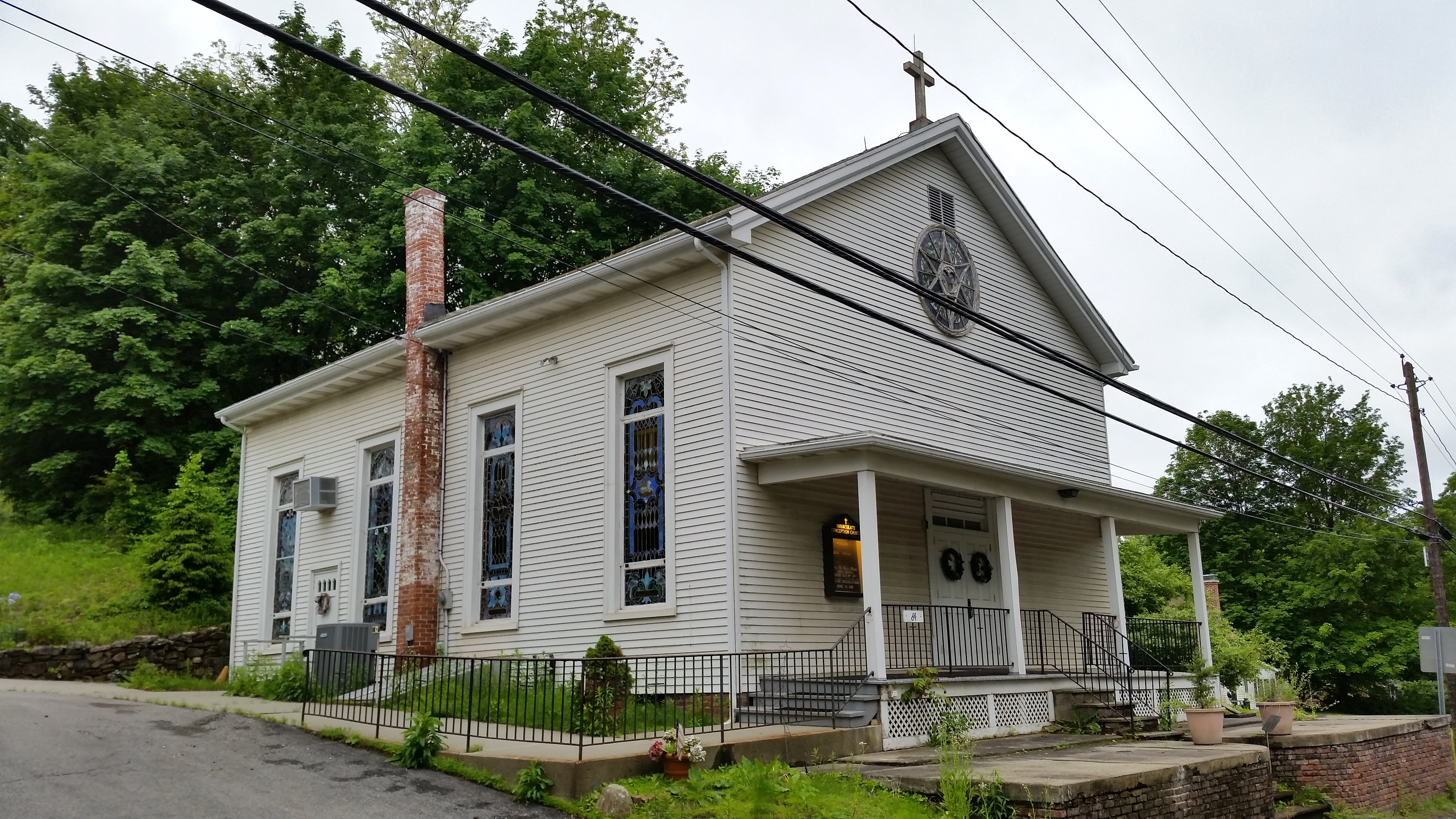
- Immaculate Conception Church in 2017
- Church of the Immaculate Conception
- Location: Bangall, New York
- Denomination: Roman Catholic
- Website: Immaculate Conception Church

History
- Founded: 1919

Administration
- Archdiocese: Archdiocese of New York

The Church of the Immaculate Conception is a Roman Catholic parish church under the authority of the Roman Catholic Archdiocese of New York, located in 64 Hunns Lake Road, Bangall, Dutchess County, New York State. It holds masses Saturdays at 5pm, Sundays at 10 and 11:30am, and confessions on Saturdays from 3:30 to 4:30pm.

The parish of the Immaculate Conception in Bangall was founded as a mission of St. Joseph's in Millbrook. In 1905, the parish of the Immaculate Conception acquired the Second Baptist Church building. On December 19, 2013, Father William White, administrator of Immaculate Conception parish, received word from the archdiocese that the church building would be closed immediately due to the building's deteriorating condition as detailed in several engineering studies. This was done in anticipation of severe winter weather threatening the structure's roof. Parishioners moved the liturgical and other contents of the church to St. Mary's parish hall, located about one-third of a mile from Immaculate Conception Church on Hunns Lake Road. The move was accomplished in time for the 5:00 p.m. Mass on Saturday, December 21 to be held at the hall, where Auxiliary Bishop Dominick J. Lagonegro celebrated the 10:30 a.m. Mass on Christmas.

== St. Joseph's Chapel, Clinton Corners ==
The Chapel of St. Joseph (41°49′38.13″N 73°45′41.83″W), also nicknamed Little St. Joseph's Church, was a church under the authority of the Roman Catholic Archdiocese of New York, located in Clinton Corners. In 1889 St. Joseph's was established as a mission church of the Church of the Immaculate Conception in Amenia, New York. Father Anthony Molloy would travel from Amenia to minister to the Catholic community in Clinton Corners.

In 1890 Rev. Michael Edward Byrne was appointed to the recently established St. Joseph's Parish in Millbrook, New York, and responsibility for the mission church in Clinton Corners was transferred from Amenia to the church in Millbrook. Mass was often celebrated in private houses and the priest and his driver, Patrick Doyle, from Millbrook, were often invited to stay for Sunday dinner. Byrne was assisted by Fathers Hughes, Dunphy, Canary, Coyle, Welch, and Barry.

In 1903 Father John F. Weir succeeded Fr.Byrne. Weir was assisted by Fathers Donahue, Louis P. Bossard (1905), Cushion, Gallagher, Coakley, Doherty, and Ross.

In May 2015, the Archdiocese announced that St. Joseph's in Clinton Corners would merge with St. Joseph's in Millbrook, with the Millbrook location as the parish church. Although the remaining church building was used on special occasions, weekly Masses and the sacraments ceased as of August 2015. Upon the request of the pastor of the new consolidated parish of St. Joseph - Immaculate Conception in Millbrook, Timothy Cardinal Dolan, Archbishop of New York, by a decree dated 30 June 2017, declared St. Joseph's Chapel be deconsecrated due to "the dangerous condition of the church building, the immense financial burden to retain and maintain the building, and the lack of parochial resources".
