= Our Lady of Mount Carmel's Church (Poughkeepsie, New York) =

Church building in Poughkeepsie, United States of America

Coordinates: 41°42′33″N 73°56′13″W

Old Church of Our Lady of Mount Carmel
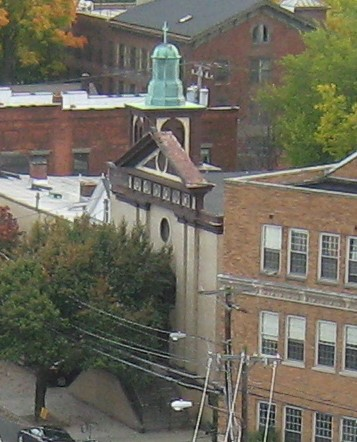
- Old Our Lady of Mt. Carmel Catholic Church

General information
- Location: Poughkeepsie, New York, United States of America
- Groundbreaking: March 1910
- Construction started: March 1910 (for church)
- Completed: October 12, 1910 (for church); November 1913 (for rectory)
- Cost: $27,500 (for 1910 church and 1913 rectory)
- Client: Roman Catholic Archdiocese of New York

Technical details
- Structural system: brick and marble

The Church of Our Lady of Mount Carmel is a historic Roman Catholic parish church building located in Poughkeepsie, Dutchess County, New York.

== History ==
In the early 1900s the Italian population of the city of Poughkeepsie had increased substantially. Fr. William Livingston, pastor of St. Peter's, invited the growing Italian community to use the lower church for Masses offered by Rev. Angelus M. Iacobucci (d. March 30, 1955). Livingston and his successor, Rev. Joseph F. Sheahan, recognized that these Italian parishioners would be better served by a priest who spoke their own language and was familiar with the community's customs. At the time, the Mass was in Latin, but the preaching was done in the vernacular.) Unfortunately, because the Mass for the Italians was in the lower church, this was interpreted by many in the Italian community as the Irish having relegated them to the cellar. This was a contributing factor in the Italian community organizing to build their own church.

Our Lady of Mount Carmel parish was incorporated on February 20, 1908 as a national parish for Italians even though within the parish boundaries of St. Peter's, Poughkeepsie. Property was purchased June 1909 for a new church from John I. Platt on the west side of Cataract Place, on what is now Mount Carmel Place. and ground was broken the following March. The cornerstone was laid May 1, 1910 by Bishop Cusack and the church was consecrated on October 12, 1910, by the Rt. Rev. Mgr. Michael Lavelle, V.G. A rectory was built November 1913. In 1913, the parish contained 245 families of about 1,700 souls.

The first pastor was the Rev. Nicola Pavone, who was born at Trivento, Italy, on August 18, 1878, ordained at a seminary there December 23, 1901, and studied at La Minerva University in Rome. From 1903 to 1904, he had a bishop's secretary in Trivento, then he taught at the seminary at Larino before arriving in New York on December 20, 1905, where he was assigned to St. Peter's in Poughkeepsie. In a gesture of friendship and gratitude to St. Peter's Church for having hosted the Italian community prior to the building of Our Lady of Mt. Carmel, Fr. Pavone asked the pastor of St. Peter's at the time Monsignor Joseph Sheahan to offer the first Mass in the newly built Mt. Carmel church after its consecration.

Rev. Fabian Lalli (1915-1922) and Rev. Salvatore Realbuto (1922-1932) followed Rev. Pavone as pastor. On April 30, 1932, Father Joseph Maria Pernicone was appointed fourth pastor of Our Lady of Mount Carmel. In 1935 Father Pernicone established Our Lady of Mount Carmel School which was staffed by the Sisters of St. Francis. (The school closed in 2007 due to declining enrollment. Two years later, the school building was reopened under the direction of Astor Services and now functions as a school for special-needs students.) The parish grew in members and activities under Rev. Pernicone who was aided by Rev. Cajetan Troy, until the later entered the U.S. Army as a chaplain during World War II. Troy was replaced by Rev. Charles Rosselle.

In January 1944, Rev. Pernicone was transferred to the Bronx and replaced as pastor by Rev. Salvatore Cantatore. In the school, the Sisters of Notre Dame replaced the Sisters of St. Francis. Rev. Joseph Vitanza was pastor after Cantatore.

In 1965, when Msgr. Joseph Raimondo was pastor, the congregation moved into the former St. Peter's church edifice at 97 Mill Street, when St. Peter's parish re-located to the southeast corner of Dorsey Avenue and Violet Avenue in Hyde Park, NY. (Currently, Astor Services currently occupies the original Church building on Mount Carmel Place.)

Italian American pastors, such as Rev. August DiBlasi, Rev. Anthony Mestice, Rev. Mario Ziccarelli, Rev. Mario Bastone, and Rev. Richard LaMorte continued to serve the community, even as many second and third generation Italians who grew up in the Mount Carmel neighborhood, moved out of the City of Poughkeepsie into the surrounding Town of Poughkeepsie but continued to return to Mount Carmel as their neighborhood church. The area has been home to many of Poughkeepsie's new immigrant populations, starting with the Irish, later the Italians. Still home to several Italian restaurants and bakeries, the area is widely referred to as Poughkeepsie's Little Italy. Our Lady of Mt. Carmel is now merged with St. Mary and St. Joseph parishes under the pastorship of Rev. Matthew MacDonald.

== Description ==
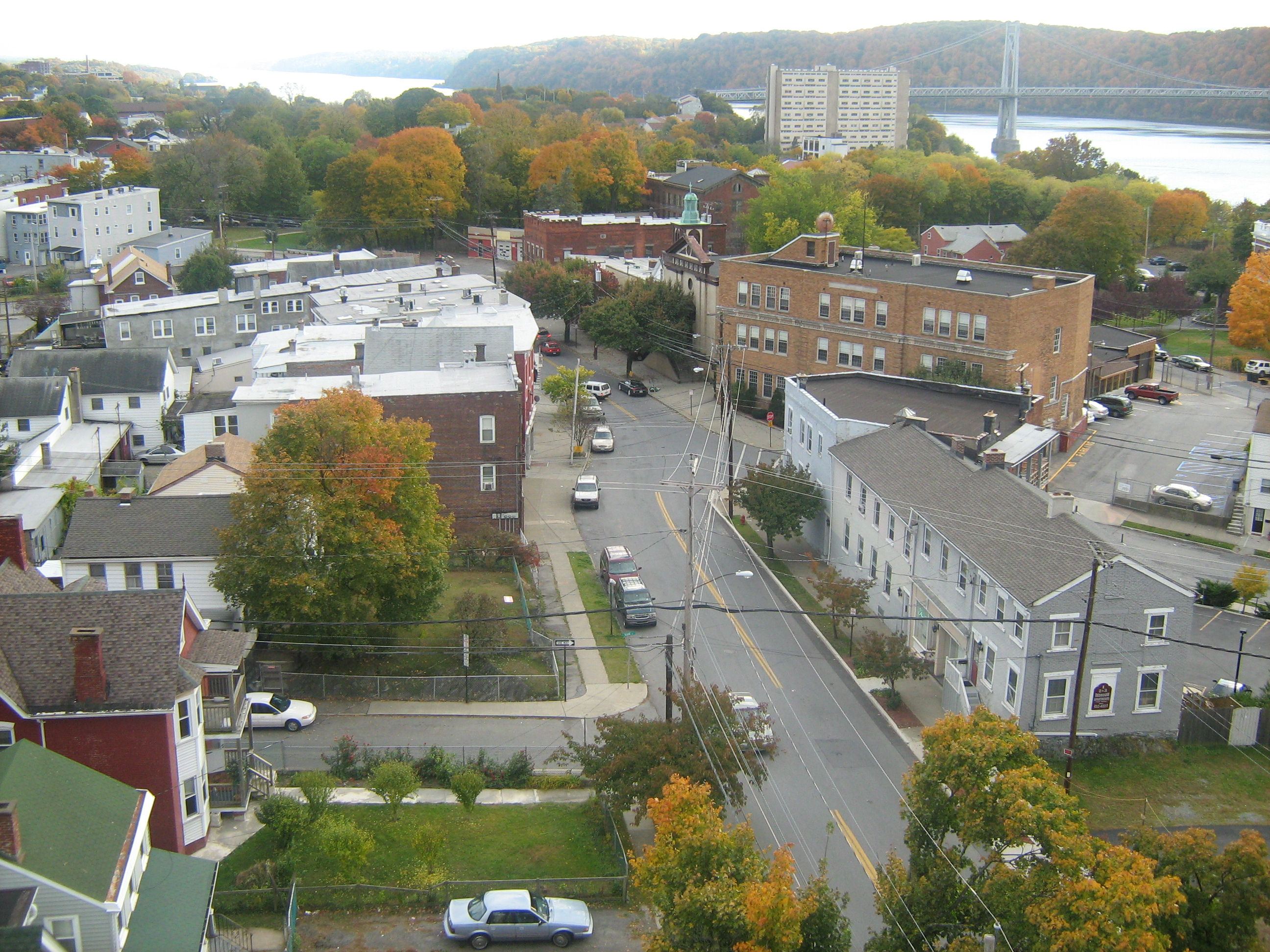
Mt Carmel District

"It is a brick and marble structure, in the Roman style, and seats 400." Parish tradition holds that much of the brick for the church was actually acquired by the Italian laborers working on the railroad, although it unclear whether this is true and if so, if the bricks were left over, thrown away bricks, or bricks that were supposed to be used for a job.
