= Church of Regina Coeli (Hyde Park) =

Church in New York, US

- 41.78814°N 73.934983°W
- Location: 12 Harvey St, Hyde Park, New York
- Country: USA
- Denomination: Roman Catholic
- Website: Regina Coeli Church

History
- Founded: 1862

Administration
- Diocese: Archdiocese of New York

Regina Coeli Church is a Roman Catholic church that was founded in 1862 in Hyde Park, New York. It includes St. Paul's mission chapel in Staatsburg, New York.

== History ==
The first church to bear the name in Hyde Park was constructed in 1863. The English Gothic brick structure was donated by Mrs. Mortimer Livingston and her daughter, Mrs. Sylvia Livingston Drayton Kirkpatrick.

The Rev. Tobias M. Fitzpatrick was the first resident priest. His successors were:

- Rev. John Parker 1883
- Rev. Michael Murray 1884
- Rev. Fr. Leahy 1888
- Rev. Terence F. Kelly 1890
- Rev. R.J. Burns 1898
- Rev. John De La Poer Lonargan

Later a large church was constructed near the original foundation, which can still be seen today. The current church building, dedicated in 1966, is on U.S. Route 9, also referred to as Albany Post Road.

== Parish School ==
Founded in 1955, the parish elementary school contained grades Pre-K through eight, and had about 220 enrolled students in 2014. The original building was expanded once, adding a two-story wing to the back with 8 additional classrooms, in the 1970s. Regina Coeli Elementary School closed in 2015.
