= Immaculate Conception Church (Amenia, New York) =

Coordinates: 41°50′47.4″N 73°33′28.24″W

Church of the Immaculate Conception
- Church of the Immaculate Conception
- Location: Amenia, New York
- Denomination: Roman Catholic
- Website: Immaculate Conception Church

History
- Founded: 1866

Architecture
- Architect: L.J. O'Connor

Administration
- Archdiocese: Archdiocese of New York

The Church of Immaculate Conception is a Roman Catholic parish church under the authority of the Roman Catholic Archdiocese of New York, located in Amenia, Dutchess County, New York. It was established as a parish in 1866.

== History ==
According to tradition, a Father Kelly of Connecticut, was the first priest to minister to Amenia. Settlers arrived about 1847, a number to work in the iron ore beds of Sharon Station.

The Immaculate Conception parish in Amenia, originally included the parishes currently in Dover Plains, Pawling, Pine Plains and Millbrook. Parish records indicate that in 1844 the first priest known to attend the sick and say an occasional Mass in the area of Northeast and Amenia was Fr. Riordan of St. Peter's Church, Poughkeepsie. In Amenia, he first celebrated Mass in the home of Thomas McEnroe. Then, in 1859 Father Charles Slavin became responsible for early Catholics here by being given charge of the whole Harlem Valley. He resided at Dover Plains and built the church there. Fr. John Arsenigo followed him, in 1864, living at Croton Falls. He used to say Mass in the sheds at the railroad station in Amenia and in homes around Millerton. It was he who purchased the land and started to build the churches in Amenia and Millerton. During the pastorate of Fr. Orsenigo, masses were held in private homes around the village while preparations were made to build a church.

Fr. Tandy became the first resident pastor in 1864 and established the first Immaculate Conception Church in 1868 presiding over the additional missions in Pawling, Dover Plains, Millerton and Millbrook for twelve years. According to his diary, Fr. Tandy was forced to resign in 1880 "under the strain of so many outlying missions"; a complaint which was echoed by many of the succeeding pastors.

Fr. Tandy was succeeded by Rev. Daniel J. Corckery in June 1880. In September 1881 a parish school was established. On July 29, 1886, the church was destroyed by lightning. The cornerstone of the new church was laid June 12, 1887.

=== Pastors ===
- 1868 - 1880 Rev. Patrick W. Tandy
- 1880 - 1888 Rev. Daniel J. Corkery
- 1888 - 1894 Rev. Anthony Molloy
- 1894 - 1899 Rev. James McEntyre
- 1899 - 1907 Rev. Dennis F. Coyle
- 1907 - 1950 Rev. Francis E. Lavelle
- 1950 - 1950 Rev. Daniel Hughes

== St Anthony's, Pine Plains ==
Church of St. Anthony
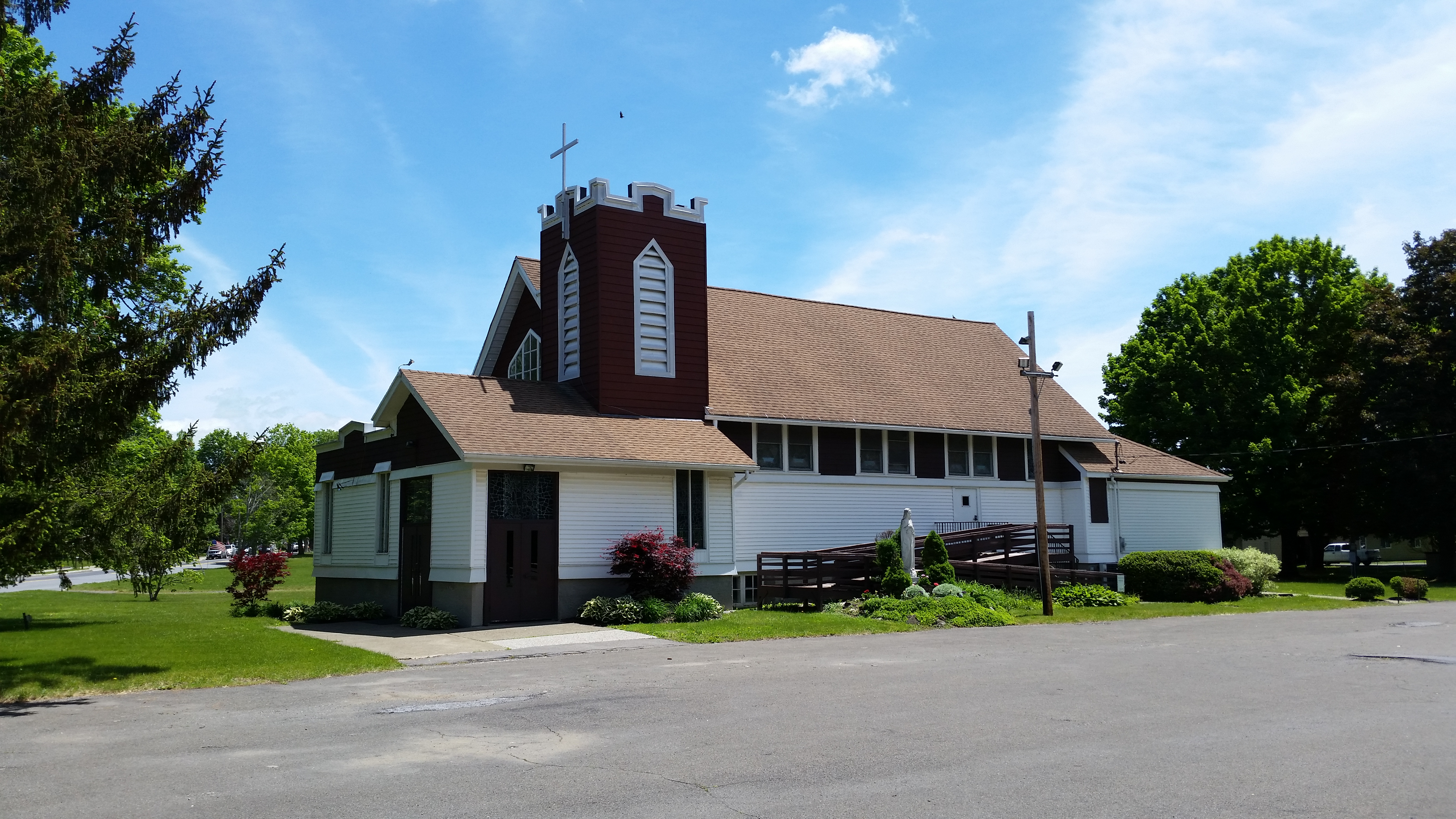
- St. Anthony's Church in 2017
- Church of St. Anthony
- Location: Pine Plains, New York
- Denomination: Roman Catholic
- Website: https://stanthonypineplains.org/

History
- Founded: 1958

Architecture
- Completed: 1912

Administration
- Archdiocese: Archdiocese of New York

The Church of St. Anthony is a Roman Catholic parish church under the authority of the Roman Catholic Archdiocese of New York, located in Pine Plains, Dutchess County, New York.

In 1870, several Irish Catholic families settled in Pine Plains, who would take the train to Millbrook and the mission of St. Joseph. Over time a priest would travel from Immaculate Conception in Amenia to celebrate Mass in a private home in Pine Plains. The church, dedicated under the patronage of St. Anthony of Padua, was built in 1912. and became s mission of Immaculate Conception Parish in 1913. Rev. Lavelle was pastor in Amenia; parishioners in Pine Plains would bring him to St. Anthony's by horse and buggy.

St. Anthony's was elevated to parish status in 1958. Rev. Vincent D. McCambley was the first pastor.

== Merger ==
As of August 1, 2015, the parish merged with Immaculate Conception, although Masses and sacraments will continue to be celebrated at St. Anthony's church.
