= Laudegg Castle =

Restored castle ruin in Austria

Castle Laudegg
- Burg Laudegg
- Tyrol, Austria; Near Ladis in Austria
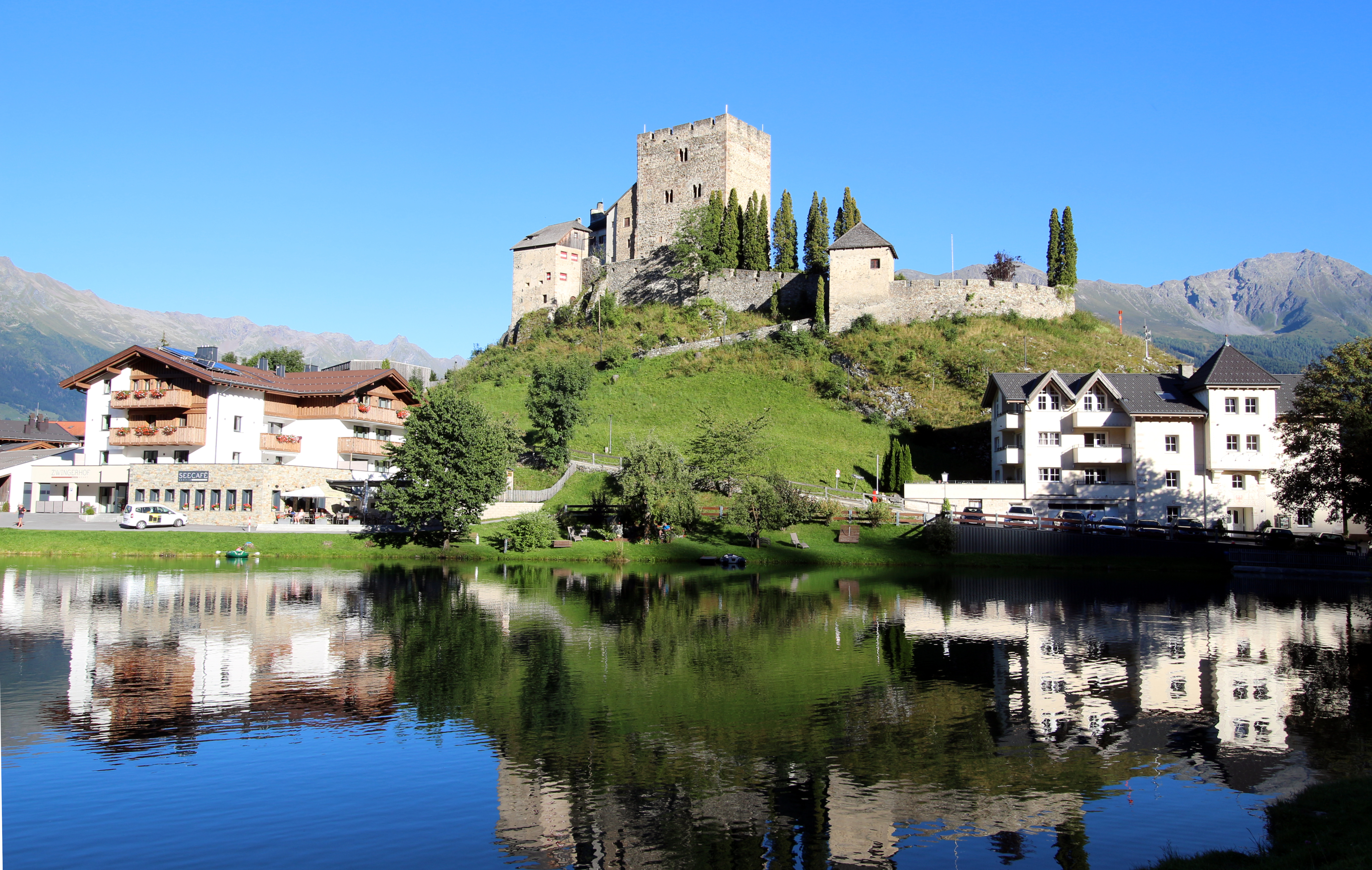
- From Ladis

Site information
- Type: Castle
- Open to the public: Yes (In the months of July and August)
- Condition: Restored

Location
- Coordinates: 47°4′34.5″N 10°39′9.5″E

Site history
- Built: 13th Century
- In use: 13th-16th Century
- Materials: Slate
- Events: Appenzell Wars

Burg Laudegg is a restored castle ruin near the three villages of Ladis, Serfaus, and Fiss, Bezirk Landeck, in the state of Tyrol, Austria. Across the Oberinntal valley lies Castle Berneck at Kauns.

== Location ==
Laudegg Castle stands at the foot of the Samnaun Alps and sits on vertical protrusion of slate above Oberinntal valley at an elevation of 1,176 metres (3,858 ft) above sea level.

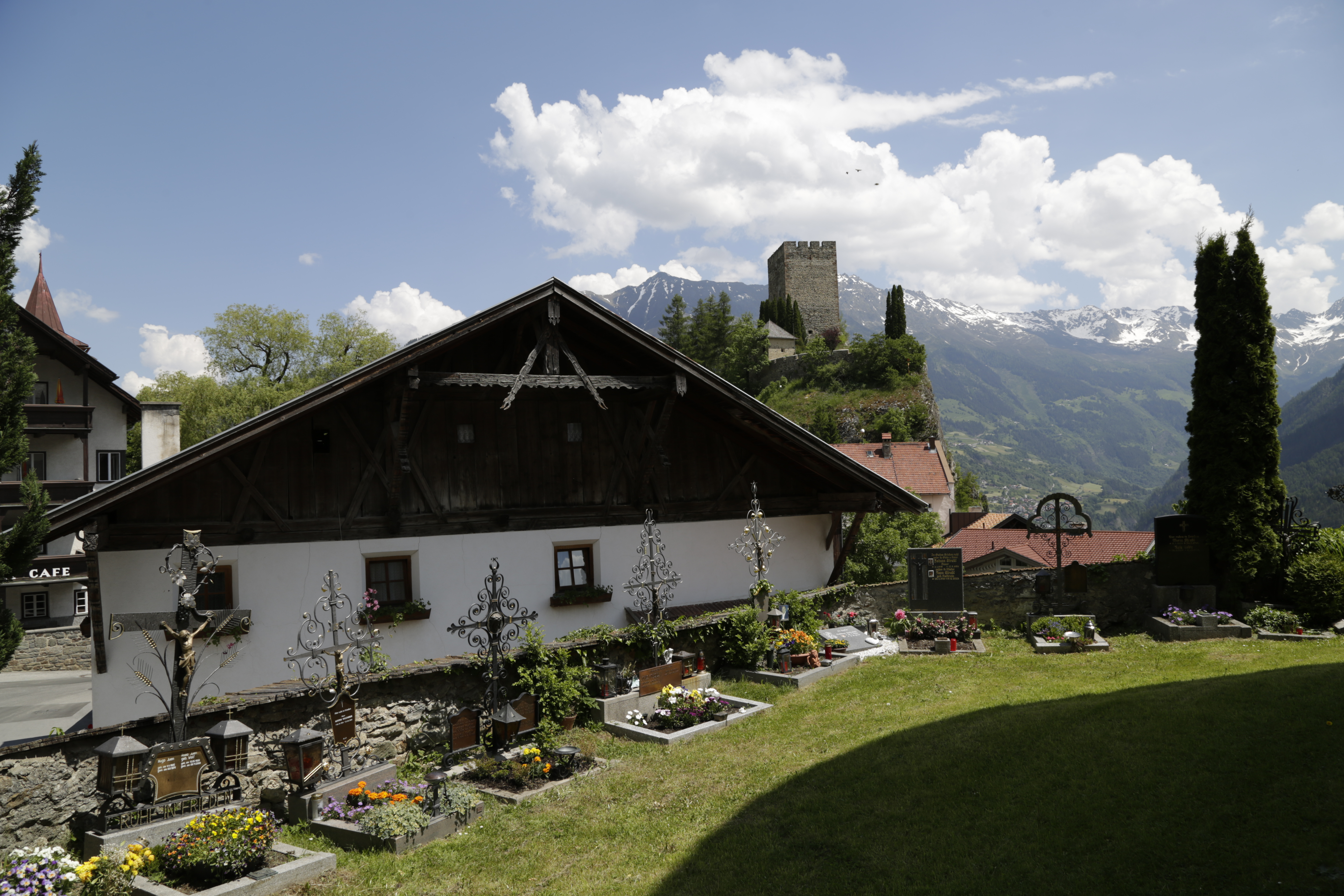
Laudegg Castle from Ladis

== History ==
The tower house was built in the Early Middle Ages and is first documented in 1239. However, a local Ministerialeship of "Laudeck" (an earlier form of Laudegg) is documented even earlier (1232) in the court diary of Duke Otto von Andechs in Innsbruck.

In 1406 Oberinntal became involved in the Appenzell peasant uprising under Ital Reding the Elder. Ladis was razed to the ground, the castle and Steinegg Castle (above Tullenfeld on the way up to Pontlatzbrücke), which was serving as its barbican was also destroyed. In the following years, only the most necessary repairs were carried out, firstly under Maximilian I, who was interested in the region, the castle was expanded somewhat, but the promised funds were not sent. Though the castle was the administrative centre of Oberes Gericht valley (Laudeck Court) until the seventeenth century, it is documented in 1551 that the Keeper of Laudegg resided in Schloss Siegmundsried (built 1471) and the castle was no longer used as a camp or weapons store. In the seventeenth century it was renovated, but the building remained empty and fell into ruin for good after the administrative centre moved to Ried im Oberinntal.

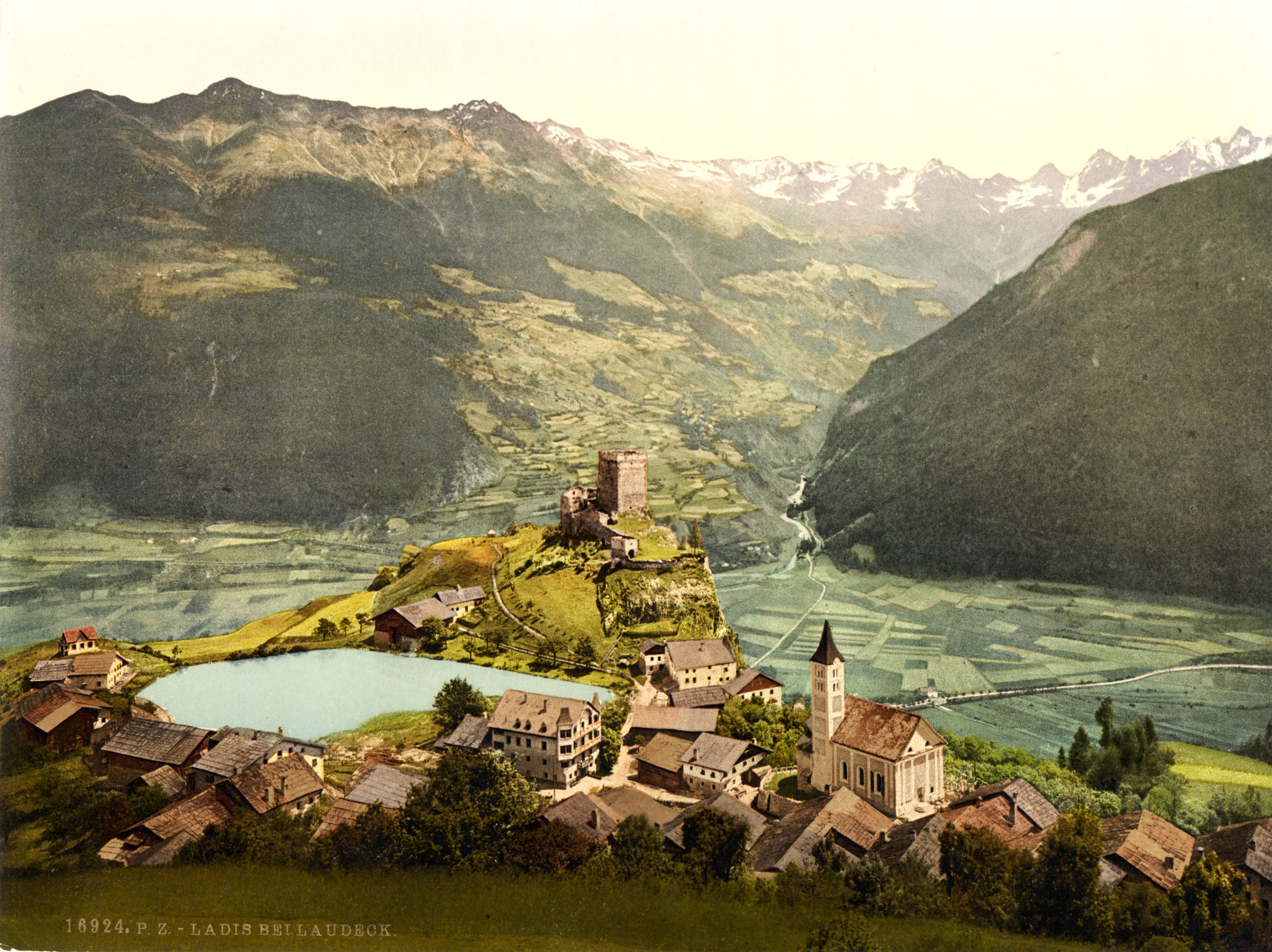
Laudegg Castle, 1900

Partial restorations began in 1964. Today the castle is on private property, but is open for visiting once a week in the months of July and August.

== Trivia ==
- Castle Laudegg lies on the side of an ancient Roman road.
- During visiting months, tickets are 2 Euros for Adults.

== See also ==
- List of castles in Austria
