= Tratzberg Castle =

Castle in Tyrol, Austria

Coordinates: 47°23′05″N 11°44′35″E

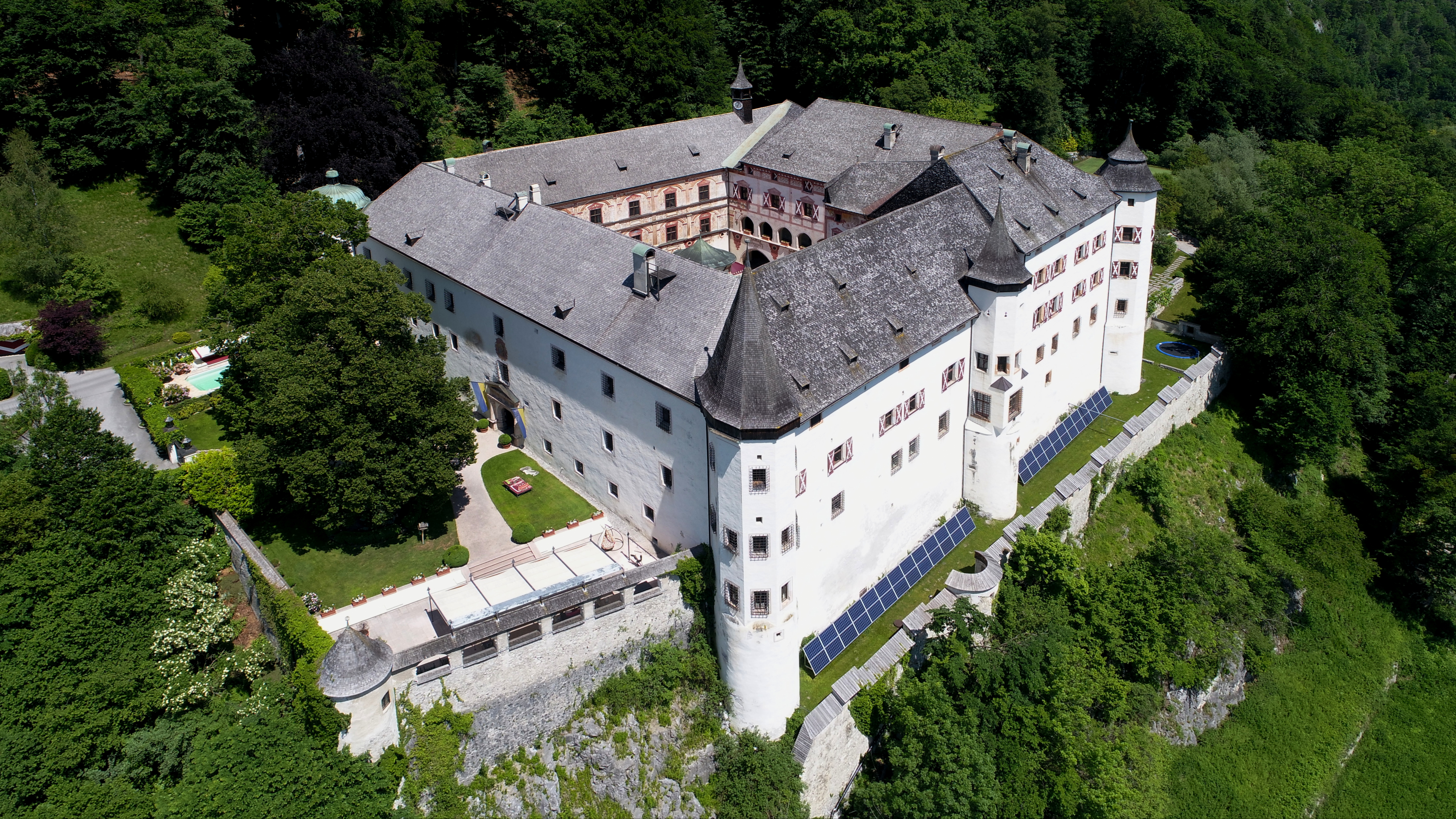
Tratzberg Castle (2017)

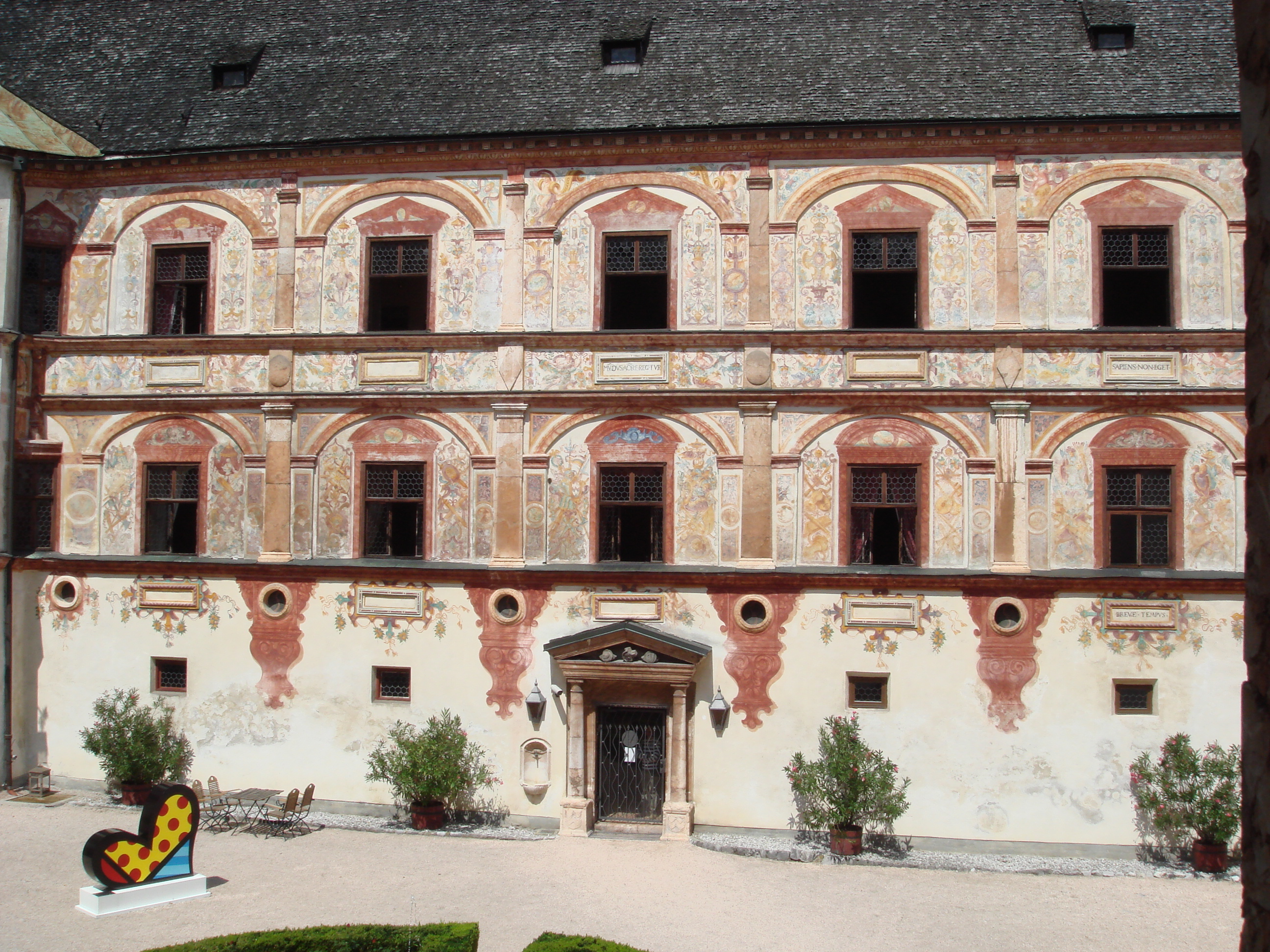
Wall of courtyard

Tratzberg Castle is a castle in Jenbach, Tyrol, Austria. Tratzberg Castle is located on a steep ridge above Jenbach in the Austrian part of Tyrol. It is an excellent example of palace architecture typical for the alpine parts of the Holy Roman Empire during the late Gothic and early Renaissance period. The castle was built in its present form in 1500 mostly by the brothers Veit-Jakob and Simon Tänzl. Today Tratzberg Castle is owned and inhabited by Count Ulrich Goëss-Enzenberg and his wife Katrin Goëss-Enzenberg. Tratzberg is also one of the best preserved castles in Austria, having many of its original furnishings and fittings.

== History ==
In 1296, chronicles mention a castle called Trazperch standing at this location. It was destroyed by fire in 1490/91. Emperor Maximilian I left the ruin to the brothers Veit-Jakob and Simon Tänzl in exchange for Berneck Castle in Kaunertal in 1499. The Brothers Tänzel were commoners that came to money as part owners of the silver mine in Schwaz, and raised into nobility in 1502. Within 8 years, starting in 1500 a three-storey four-wing complex with courtyard and stair tower, portals and arcades, columns, window sills and fireplaces in Hagauer marble was built. The north wing remained unfinished to be completed later. The castle was sold by the heirs of the Tänzl brothers in 1553. The subsequent owner, Augsburg knight Georg von Ilsung finished the north wing and also the inner yards striking façade painting originate from this era. He and his family owned the castle for the second half of the 16th century and added the castles name to their family name. Georg's daughter Anna von Ilsung married Jakob III. Fugger. The wealthy Augsburg merchant family Fugger were also deeply involved in the local copper and silver mining businesses and inherited the castle in 1589. The Fuggerchamber and the Fuggerparlour are to this day visible reminder of this famous patrician family.

During the 17th and 18th century the castle underwent numerous changes of ownership and was owned by the noble families of Stauber-Imhof, Von der Halden and Josef Ignaz Reichsfreiherren (Barons of the Empire) of Tannenberg. In 1809, during the Napoleonic Wars, Bavarian soldiers looted the armoury and demolished part of the furniture.

In 1847 the castle was acquired by the Enzenberg Family by inheritance. They decided to restore the castle and made it their main residence. The castle is currently inhabited by Count Ulrich Goëss-Enzenberg and his wife Katrin Goëss-Enzenberg who induced further restorations. They also opened the castle to visitors and tourists.

== Inventory ==
The rooms, which are open to the public, feature priceless original furniture typical for the time of transition from Gothic to Renaissance. The castle also features a wide range of historic furniture including:

- A late Gothic South Tyrolean cupboard (c. 1460), crafted for the Teutonic Order castle of Reifenstein.
- A rare gothic washstand with top, a gothic cheek table with a scissor chair, a gothic post bed.
- Two oblique tables inlaid in 1520 on winding columnar legs
- A large chest with filling doors; above this chest a late Gothic Lusterweibchen chandelier in the form of a mermaid
- An original painting by Hans Leonhard Schäufelein (1509), "Tournament at Innsbruck"
- A green-glazed cocklestove with reliefs and a crucifixion group; another such cocklestove with representations of the 5 senses from the Nuremberg workshop to Georg Fest (around 1620) is located in the so-called "queen room" (named after Anna of Bohemia).
- A women's parlour with typical utility furniture from the 17th century housewife (Renaissance box bed, cradle, high chair, ladies washbasin, spinning wheel, laundry press); on a double-storey Renaissance façade cabinet are three globes from the 18th century.

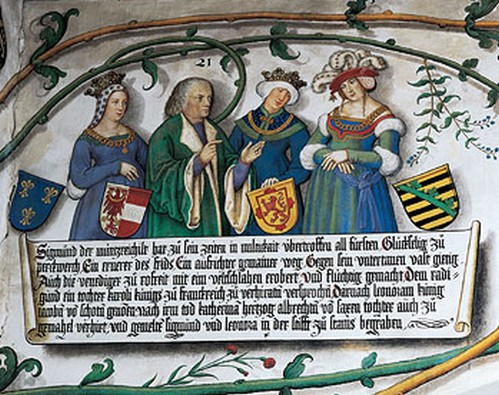
Sigismund, Archduke of Austria and his betrothed Radegonde of Valois and successive wives Eleanor of Scotland and Catherine of Saxony depicted on a fresco in the Habsburgersaal

- The "Habsburgersaal" (imperial hall) is decorated with frescoes of the imperial Habsburg family including the German king Emperor Maximilian I with his two wives (Mary of Burgundy and Bianca Maria Sforza), King Rudolf I, Duke Rudolf IV and Frederick IV, Duke of Austria and Sigmund, Archduke of Austria.
- A 19th century dining room with life-sized carved sculptures of red deer, fox and bear and sculptures of Count Franz Enzenberg III hunting with (then) Archduke Franz Joseph.
- The chapel with late gothic vault and sculptures from this period. The high altar, showing Catherine of Alexandria (patron saint of the Tratzberg Castle) however dates from 1750.
- Armory and weapons from the 15th and 16th century come from the collection of Count Franz Enzenberg III.

== Tourism and surroundings ==
The courtyard and the historic rooms of the 1st floor - can be visited from late March to early November as part of guided tours. The castle also features additional touristic infrastructure including, various parking lots, a transfer train a playground for children and a restaurant.

The castle is located on a wooded ridge on the slopes of the Karwendel and connected by significant hiking trails, leading to the pilgrimage destination St. Georgenberg-Fiecht Abbey, and to the natural reserves Wolfsklamm and Alpenpark Karwendel.

== See also ==
- List of castles in Austria
