= Ministerialis =

European medieval social class

The ministeriales (singular: ministerialis) were a legally unfree but socially elite class of knights, administrators, and officials in the High Middle Ages in the Holy Roman Empire, drawn from a mix of servile origins, free commoners, and even younger sons of minor noble families, who served secular and ecclesiastical lords and often rose to hold hereditary land, noble titles, and political power indistinguishable from the free nobility.

The word and its German translations, Ministeriale(n) and Dienstmann, came to describe those unfree nobles who made up a large majority of what could be described as the German knighthood during that time. What began as an irregular arrangement of workers with a wide variety of duties and restrictions rose in status and wealth to become the power brokers of an empire.

The ministeriales were not legally free people, but held social rank. Legally, their liege lord determined whom they could or could not marry, and they were not able to transfer their lords' properties to heirs or spouses. They were, however, considered members of the nobility since that was a social designation, not a legal one. Ministeriales were trained knights, held military responsibilities and surrounded themselves with the trappings of knighthood, and so were accepted as noblemen.

Both women and men held the ministerial status, and the laws on ministeriales made no distinction between the sexes in how they were treated. The term is a post-classical Latin word, meaning originally "servant" or "agent", in a broad range of senses, rather than the modern connotation of a high-ranking politician or administrator.

== Origins to 11th century ==
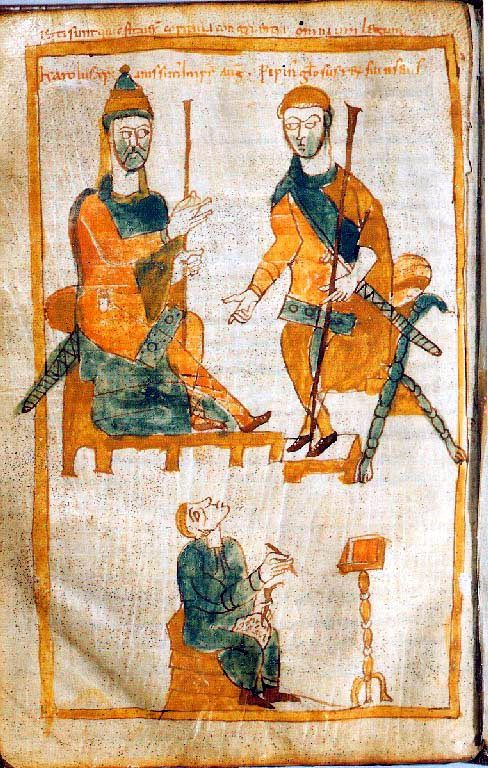
Charlemagne, Pippin, and a ministerial clerk; a 10th-century copy of the original

The origin of the ministerial pedigree is obscure. A mediaeval chronicler reported that Julius Caesar defeated the Gauls and rewarded his Germanic allies with Roman rank. Princes were awarded senatorial status and their lesser knights ('minores...milites') received Roman citizenship. He assigned these 'knights' to princes but urged the princes "to treat the knights not as slaves and servants but rather to receive their services as the knights' lords and defenders. "Hence it is," the chronicler explained, "that German knights, unlike their counterparts in other nations, are called servants of the royal fisc and princely ministerials." In England there was no group of knights referred to as ministeriales, for the tight grip that English lords held upon their knights gave them less freedom than their German counterparts who had codified (and well-defended) rights.

Abbot Adalard of Corbie (d. 826) was Emperor Charlemagne's chief adviser, and described the running of the government in his work De ordine palatii. There he praises the great merits of his imperial staff, made up of household servii proprii (serfs) who were the first ministerials authoritatively recorded. His letters specify that not only were they considered exceptional by their superiors, but the ministerials also mentored their successors in a form of administrative apprenticeship program. This may be the origin of ministerials as individuals in a set position.

It was Emperor Conrad II (990-1039) who first referred to ministerials as a distinct class. He had them organized into a staff of officials and administrators. In documents they are referred to as ministerialis vir, or ministerial men.

Ministeriales (or "ministerials", as Anglicized by Benjamin Arnold) of the post-Classical period who were not in the royal household were at first bondsmen or serfs taken from the servi proprii, or household servants (as opposed to the servi casati who were already tilling the land on a tenure.) These servants were entrusted with special responsibilities by their overlords, such as the management of a farm, administration of finances (chancery) or of various possessions. Free nobles (Edelfreie) disliked entering into servile relationships with other nobles, so lords of a necessity recruited bailiffs, administrators and officials from among their unfree servants who could also fulfill a household warrior role. From the 11th century the term came to denote functionaries living as members of the knightly class with either a lordship of their own or one delegated from a higher lord as well as some political influence (inter alia the exercise of offices at court).

Kings placed military requirements upon their princes, who in turn, placed requirements upon their vassals. The free nobles under a prince may have a bond of vassalage that let them get out of serving, so kings, princes, bishops and archbishops were able to recruit unfree persons into military service. Such a body made up the group called ministeriales.

There were two sorts of ministerials: casati, who administered lands and estates for a liege and were paid from the proceeds of the land and non-casati, who held administrative and military positions but were paid in either a fixed amount of coin or by a portion of the proceeds of mills, road or bridge tolls, or ferry fees or port taxes.

== 11th–12th centuries ==
As the need for such service functions became more acute (as, for example, during the Investiture Controversy), and their duties and privileges, at first nebulous, became more clearly defined, the ministeriales developed in the Salian period (1024–1125) into a new and much differentiated class. They received fiefs, which to begin with were not heritable, in return for which they provided knightly services. They were also allowed to possess, and often did hold, allods: ownership of real property (land, buildings and fixtures) that is independent of any superior landlord, but it should not be confused with anarchy as the owner of allodial land is not independent of his sovereign. Ministerials were found holding the four great offices necessary to run a great household: seneschal, butler, marshal and chamberlain. They were vidames (vice dominus, or runners of estates) or castellans, having both military and administrative responsibilities. Conrad II of Kuchl was the financial adviser to four archbishops over the course of 40 years.

From the reign of Archbishop Conrad II (1024–1039) they were employed as stewards (Vögte), castellans (Burggrafen) and judges in the administration of the imperial territories, and in the lay principalities. As Imperial ministerials (Reichsministerialen) they upheld the Salian, and particularly the Hohenstaufen, imperial polity.

In the Archbishopric of Salzburg the ministerials and clergy together elected Archbishop Gebhard in 1060, as well as every archbishop from 1147 to 1256 save for Conrad III (r. 1177–83).

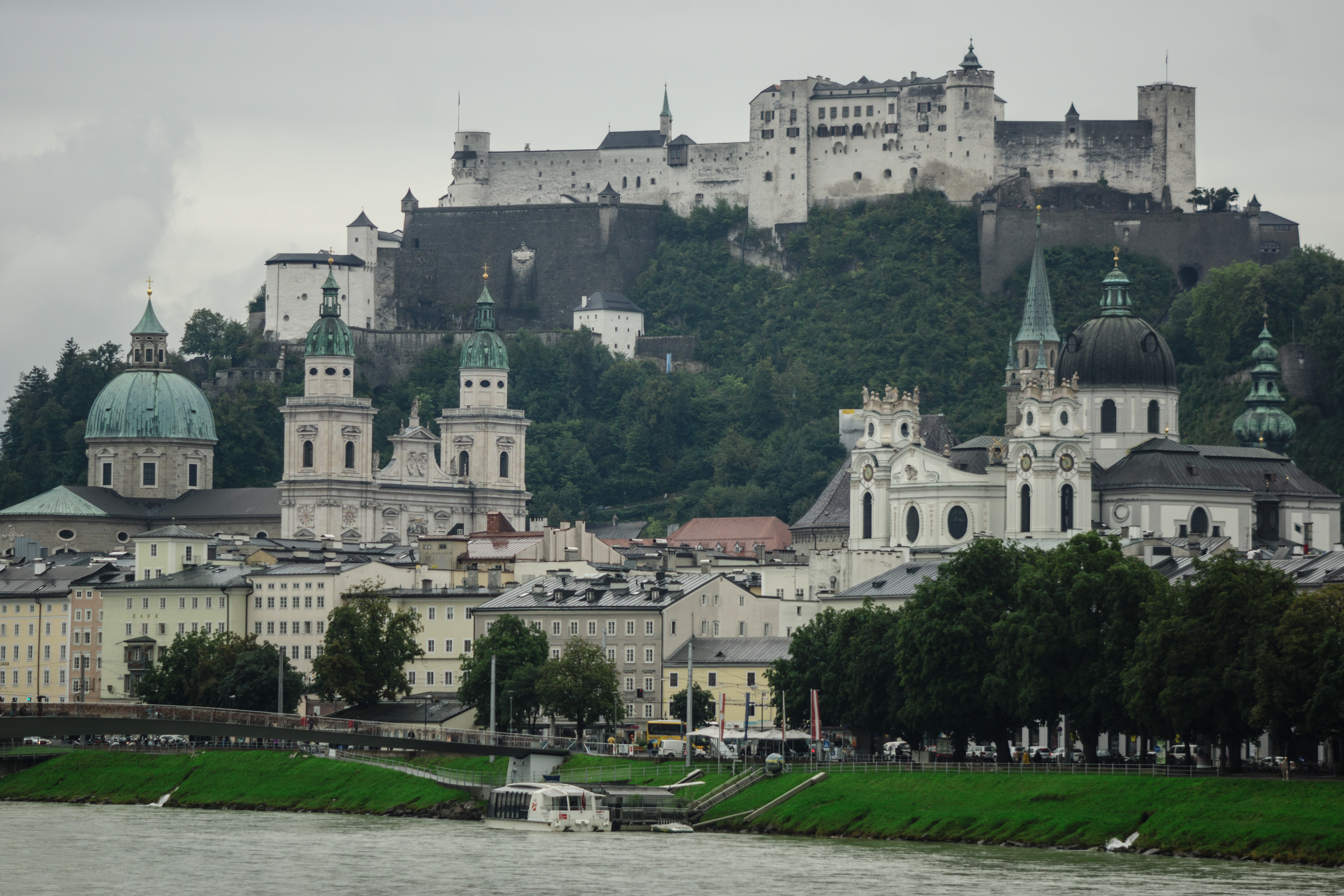
The fortress of Hohensalzburg, overlooking Salzburg, Austria, was run by a ministerial castellan

Ministerials could be drawn from different occupational groups. In Salzburg, Austria a Timo appears in 1125/47 in the traditionsbuch (book of traditions) as a miles (knight) of the archiepiscopal ministerialage who functioned as burgrave and also as a merchant.

By the 12th century a distinction was made between greater ministerials (ministeriales maiores) who had their own vassals and lesser ministerials (ministeriales minores) who had no vassals of their own.

During the 12th century the old free nobility of Salzburg even found it a wise strategy to surrender their freedom in return for the safety of Salzburg's patronage. Around 1145, Ulrich I of the lesser-noble Sims family chose to subjugate his household to the archbishop by marrying the Salzburg ministerial Liutkarda von Berg. Their son, Ulrich II, was born into his mother's status as was the practice, but now the Simses enjoyed the protection of one of the most powerful houses in the region. This was a wise strategy, considering the weak Simses were surrounded by greedy neighbors.

By the end of the 12th century the term miles—theretofore reserved for free warriors—was also being applied to ministerials. Over the course of the 13th century their status was slowly assimilated to that of the free nobility, or vassals. The remaining traces of the taint of servility gradually faded, and the "fiefs for service" turned into proper hereditable fiefs, partly also because impoverished free nobles, while reserving their personal free status, voluntarily became ministeriales.

== 13th century onwards ==
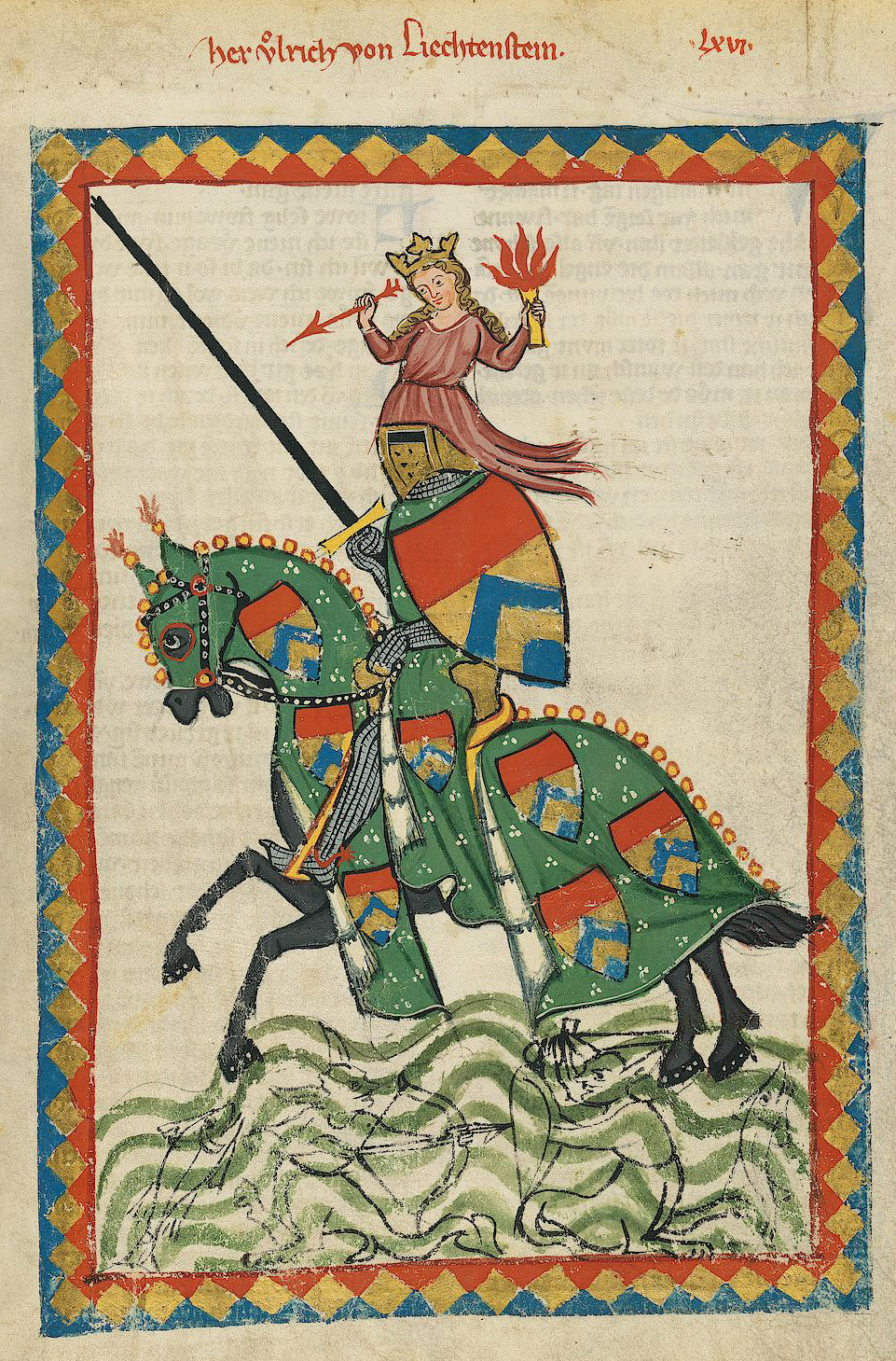
Portrait of the famous ministerial Ulrich von Liechtenstein (1200–1275) from the Codex Manesse

By the 13th century Bavarian law held that the ministeriales (or Dienstmänner) held a position higher than the ordinary milites, and only the monarchy and princes were permitted to maintain ministeriales. Imperial courts increasingly rendered justice for ministerials, as when Count Frederick of Isenberg murdered Archbishop Engelbert of Cologne in 1225. The archiepiscopal ministerials brought an appeal (and the blood-stained clothing) to the Royal Court to demand justice. The count's brothers, the bishops of Münster and Osnabrück, were brought before the court for complicity, and bloodshed at the court was narrowly averted. Count Frederick was convicted in absentia, all his ministerials were released from his service, and Frederick was captured and broken on the wheel.

By the 13th and 14th centuries the ministeriales formed an intrinsic part of the lower nobility, and in the 15th century formed the core of the German knightly class (Ritterstand). Other regions were not as open, for as late as the fifteenth century the documents of the Dutch province of Gelderland continued to distinguish between knights of noble and of ministerial birth.

== Certain vassal relationships ==
=== Social differentiation ===
Legally, a ministerial was a ministerial, bound by the rights and duties enumerated in their area. Socially, there was a distinction between the greater ministerials and the lesser ones in the order of precedence. Greater ministerials maintained their own subordinate milites, or armigerous soldiery. These could be either free knights (such as Werner of Bolland, who maintained 1,100 subordinate knights for Frederick Barbarossa) or lesser ministerials like the wealthy widow Diemut von Högl, who held four castles with ministerial chaplain, chamberlain and seneschal. The lesser ministerials were ones who held no subordinates at all, but rather held an office and may or may not have maintained arms and armor.

=== Uses and duties ===
As with all medieval terms of vassalage, the duties, obligations and benefits varied by region and even individual negotiation or tradition. These are often recorded in the Holy Roman Empire in a document named a Dienstrecht, or "service code."

==== Military ====
One constant is that all arrangements included a duty owed to the lord for military service. This could take the form of actual personal service by the ministeriales or a payment to fund others who went to war. The monastery of Maurmunster records the following:

When a campaign (profectio) of the king is announced to the bishop (of Metz, in this case) the bishop will send an official to the abbot, and the abbot will assemble his ministeriales. He will inform them of the campaign, and they will assemble the following men and equipment...: one wagon with six cows and six men; one packhorse with saddle and equipment and two men, the leader and the driver...If the king moves the army to Italy, all the peasant farms shall contribute for that purpose their usual taxes (that is, probably an entire annual rent as an extraordinary tax). But if the army moves against Saxony, Flanders or elsewhere on this side of the Alps, only half that amount will be given. From these additional taxes the wagons and pack animals will be loaded with rations and other items necessary for the journey.

In Bamberg the Carolingian method of providing for a campaign remained in effect. Ministeriales were grouped into threes; one went on campaign while the other two were responsible for equipping and victualing him. This ensured that those who were sent to war were prepared for war. This also shows that a military obligation didn't necessarily mean riding off with the army. The archbishops of Cologne differentiated between his poorer and wealthier vassals. Ministerials with an annual income of 5 marks or more were required to go on campaign in person, but those with smaller incomes were offered the choice to go on the march or to give half the income of their fief that year as a military tax.

==== Administration ====
Ministerials fulfilled a range of offices that ran their lieges' fiefs for them. They were found in the four traditional offices of a household: chamberlain, marshal, butler and seneschal. Conrad II von Kuchl served his succession of archbishop lieges as a financial adviser for forty years, Werner von Lengfelden was master of Hohensalzburg Castle's huge kitchen, and Ulrich II served as vidame of Salzburg in 1261, then, at various times, as marshal between 1270 and 1295, and as burgrave of Tittmoning in 1282. Ministerials could also be assigned to claim unused or poorly defended border areas, as with Laudegg Castle and Hohenwerfen Castle.

==== Trade and commerce ====
Greater ministerials considered themselves above trading in money, as did many nobles of the era, but Freed notes a number of ministerials who couldn't afford to turn up their noses to income. Circa 1125, Timo served not only as the burgrave of Salzburg but also as a merchant of the city. Ortolf of Kai - also a Salzburger - brokered the produce of his own vineyards. Gerhoh Itzling even appeared as a 'zechmeister' (guildmaster) in Salzburg.

=== Rights and restrictions ===
Nobility was a social distinction, so even the unfree ministerials were considered higher in precedence than a free commoner. Being of a noble estate, ministerials were exempt from the more odious of corvée duties that other types of serfs performed, though some lieges would reserve the right to commandeer plow-teams and draft horses. Some ministerial women did perform household duties but were well-compensated for the chores.

Ministerials were serfs, and as such could not move without expressed permission of their lord or lady, though in certain clergy lands they could take holy orders without permission. Ministerials were in many places forbidden to marry without permission, but in other places, their freedom to marry was recognized based on papal authority, deriving from Galatians 3:28. If a liege disliked any marriage, though, the liege could easily withdraw any lands or income held by his subject. Any marriage was subject to review or approval of the liege, as in Salzburg:

In July 1213 Archbishop Eberhard II of Salzburg (1200–1246) and Bishop Manegold of Passau (1206–1215) asked King Frederick II at the imperial court held at Eger (today Cheb in the Czech Republic) to confirm the marriage contract that Gerhoch II of Bergheim-Radeck, an archiepiscopal ministerial, had made with Bertha of Lonsdorf, a Passau ministerial. The couple had agreed, presumably with their lords' consent, that their first two children were to belong to Salzburg and the third to Passau, and that any remaining children would be divided equally between the two churches. Gerhoch and Bertha could confer their allod on each other, and their children would share their paternal and maternal inheritances equally.

The usual rule was that children of a mixed-status marriage would have the legal standing of the lesser of the parents. The child of a free knight and an unfree ministerial, therefore, was a ministerial. The liege of the mother would be the child's liege, for the child "followed the womb" (partus sequitor ventrem).
Not everyone agrees with this interpretation, as some examples allow for free lords to challenge this ruling and maintain their status as free knights.

== See also ==
- Castle warrior
- Devşirme
- Gentry
- Mamluk
- Vavassor

== Sources ==
- Arnold, Benjamin (1985). German Knighthood 1050–1300. Oxford: Clarendon Press.
- Bachrach, Bernard S. (April 2002). "Charlemagne and the Carolingian General Staff". Journal of Military History. 66 (2): 313–357. doi:10.2307/3093063. JSTOR 3093063.
- Delbrück, Hans, trans. Walter Renfroe Jr. History of the Art of War, Volume III: Medieval Warfare (Lincoln, NE: University of Nebraska Press, 1982)
- Freed, John B. (June 1986). "Reflections on the Medieval German Nobility". American Historical Review. 91 (3). Oxford University Press: 553–575. doi:10.2307/1869131. JSTOR 1869131.
- Freed, John B. (July 1987). "Nobles, Ministerials and Knights in the Archdiocese of Salzburg". Speculum. 62 (3). University of Chicago Press: 575–611. doi:10.2307/2846383. JSTOR 2846383.
- Freed, John B. (1995). Noble Bondsmen: Ministerial Marriages in the Archdiocese of Salzburg, 1100– 1343. Ithaca, NY: Cornell University Press. ISBN 978-1-5017-4256-9. JSTOR 10.7591/j.ctvn1tb2j.
- Ganshof, François-Louis (1939). "Benefice and Vassalage in the Age of Charlemagne". Cambridge Historical Journal. 6 (2). Cambridge University Press: 147–175. doi:10.1017/S1474691300003358. JSTOR 3020714.
- Leyser, Karl (December 1968). "The German Aristocracy from the Ninth to the Early Twelfth Century: A Historical and Cultural Sketch". Past & Present (41). Oxford University Press: 25–53. doi:10.1093/past/41.1.25. JSTOR 650002.
- Thompson, James Westfall (1923). "German Feudalism". The American Historical Review. 28 (3): 440–474. doi:10.1086/ahr/28.3.440.
