= Ladis =

Municipality in Tyrol, Austria

- Municipality
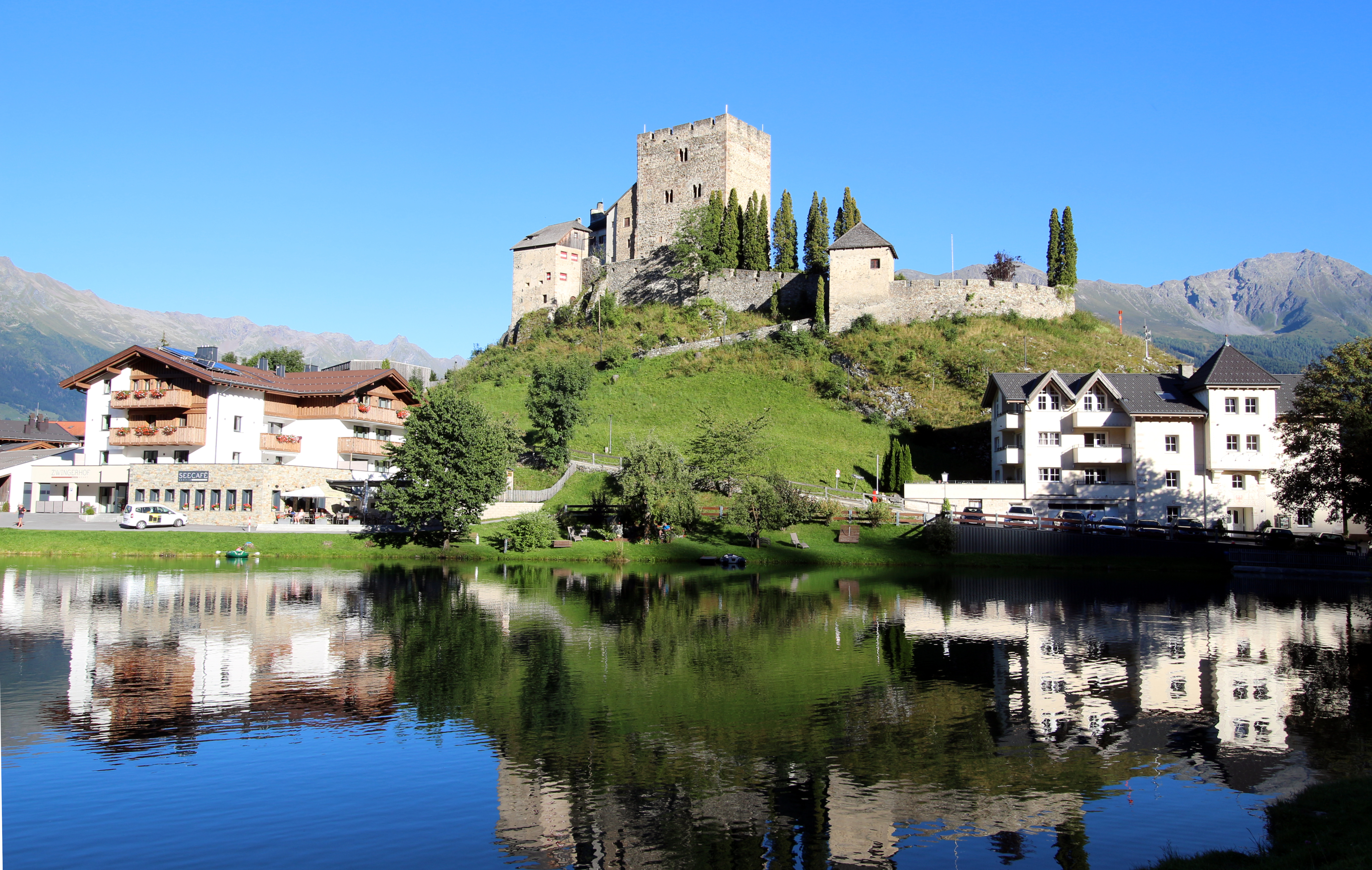
- Laudegg Castle in Ladis

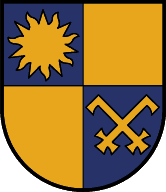
- Coat of arms

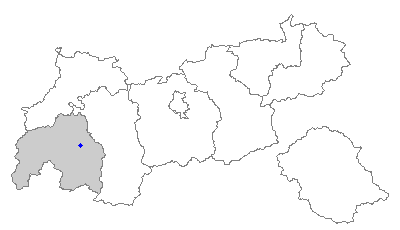
- Location of Ladis within Tyrol

- Location within Austria
- Coordinates: 47°04′00″N 10°37′00″E
- Country: Austria
- State: Tyrol
- District: Landeck

Government
  - Mayor: Florian Klotz

Area
  - Total: 7.11 km^{2} (2.75 sq mi)
- Elevation: 1,189 m (3,901 ft)

Population (2018-01-01)
  - Total: 531
  - Density: 74.7/km^{2} (193/sq mi)
- Time zone: UTC+1 (CET)
  - Summer (DST): UTC+2 (CEST)
- Postal code: 6532
- Area code: 05472
- Vehicle registration: LA
- Website: www.ladis.tirol.gv.at

Ladis is a municipality in the district of Landeck (district) in the Austrian state of Tyrol located 9.5 km south of Landeck and 1.4 km west of Faggen. The village is known because of its sulphur and sour springs. Another important source of income is ski tourism.
