= Berneck Castle =

Castle in Kauns, Austria

- Kauns, Tyrol
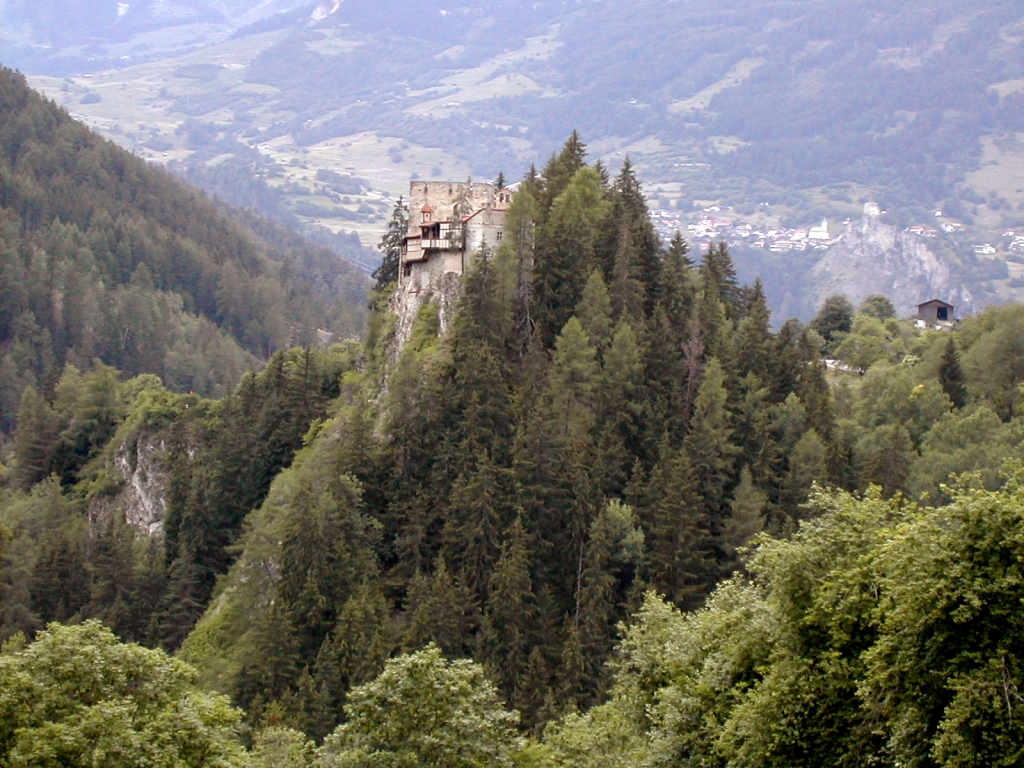

Site information
- Type: Hilltop Castle

Location
- Coordinates: 47.0758°N 10.7019°E

Site history
- Built: early 13th century

Berneck Castle is a 13th-century castle in Kauns, Austria.

== Location ==
Berneck Castle is located near Kauns, on the opposite side of the Inn valley from Laudegg Castle, and in the Kaunertal valley. The castle sits on top of a large rock close to the river Faggenbach.

== Location ==
The castle stands east of the end of the village of Kauns at 1,076 meters above sea level. To the south it is built directly on a rock face that drops 130 meters deep into the valley of the Faggenbach. In the west, a steep slope descends into the Kaunertal. The castle is only separated from the surrounding area by its slightly elevated position on a hill. The castle is of little strategic importance. It was most likely built to secure the traffic route over the Piller.

== Owner ==
The castle was first mentioned in 1225, though the site contains evidence of a building before then. and the Lords of Berneck were named as the owners. Blasius von Berneck died childless in 1396 and the fief passed to his brother Zacharias von Berneck, whose marriage to Barbara von Laatsch also remained childless. The castle fell to Margareta, daughter of the third brother Friedrich. She first married Viktor von Firmian and after his death Sigmund von Anneberg, who took over the castle in 1415. The Annebergers joined the nobility party against Duke Friedrich and then temporarily lost the castle, but got it back and sold it to the Swiss in 1435 Hans Wilhelm von Muelinen. After von Mülinen in 1457, Hans Kripp bought the castle and his son sold it to Hilprant Rasp zu Laufenbach. His daughter married Albrecht Rindsmaul, who sold the castle to Christian Tänzl in 1488. In 1499 the Roman-German King Maximilian exchanged the castle for Tratzberg Castle. In 1530 the Salzherren von Zott (also Zoten von Berneck) acquired the castle from the Habsburgs and from 1667 it was owned by the Fieger family. In 1699 it was bought by Franz Christoph von Rassler. In 1728 it came into the possession of the Freiherren von Pach, the owners of the neighboring one Bidenegg Castle near Fliess. In 1932 (or 1934) the brothers Harald and Vitus Pach sold the castle to Gottfried Knabl and Anton Kathrein in equal parts. In 1961, Max Kathrein bought the other half of the castle from Ida Knabl and sold the entire castle to Rolf Roland in the same year. In 1976 the Innsbruck architect Ekkehard Hörmann bought the castle, who had it restored and held his studio in it.

== Building history ==
Little is known about the beginnings of the castle. It is assumed that it was built by the Lords of Berneck at the beginning of the 13th century. Their former castle was most likely badly damaged during the Anneberg dispute with Duke Friedrich. It was then rebuilt by Hans Wilhelm von Mülinen as a late Gothic residential castle in the 15th century. Noteworthy is the castle chapel, which Saint Bartholomew is dedicated and contains important late Gothic frescoes. The altar of the chapel is carved directly from the rock, and there is a free pulpit in the chapel courtyard.

In 1775, the Pachs took out a loan of 1,500 guilders for a renovation, and in 1819 the complex was restored as a summer residence. After that, however, Berneck continued to decline. By the 1880s, it was already spoken of as a ruin by visitors, who reported it was overgrown with weeds. Due to dilapidation, the oldest Gothic room in North Tyrol, which Hans Wilhelm von Mülinen had set up in 1437, was dismantled in 1940 and taken to the Tyrolean Folk Art Museum. Since its renovation in 2007, it can be visited again.

The purchase of the castle by Ekkehard Hörmann and the subsequent renovation from 1977 to 1983 saved Berneck from decay. The renovation of the castle chapel with funds from the Munich Messerschmitt Foundation was completed in 1987.

== See also ==
- List of castles in Austria
