= Oberes Gericht =

Coordinates: 47.0692°N 10.6625°E

Oberes Gericht is an area in the southwest of Austria and one of 36 microregions of the federal state of Tirol. The area located in the Landeck District reaches from Pontlatzbrücke to Finstermünzpass. It borders Switzerland in the southwest and Italy in the south. According to data from January 2016, the area counts 12,787 inhabitants. Most of the settlements in the area are located among the river Inn and form part of the Inntal. In addition the area comprises another side valley of the Inntal called Kaunertal.

== Geography ==
The southern frontier of Oberes Gericht is Reschen Pass which forms the Austrian frontier to Italy. The northern frontier of Oberes Gericht is formed by the municipality of Fliess.

The area forms part of the Central Eastern Alps and compromises large parts of the Ötztal Alps and in the west contains parts of the Samnaun Alps. The intersection of the rivers Inn and Faggenbach forms the widest point of the Inntal in Oberes Gericht.

== History ==
First settlements in the area started during the Bronze Age. The area became part of the Roman Empire in 15 BC and formed part of the province Raetia. With Rhaeto-Romance a Romance language was spoken in the area during the middle age and remained spoken in the south of Oberes Gericht until the 17th century. The Ancient Romans built the Via Claudia Augusta through the area, which was the most important street crossing the Alpes from Italy to modern day Southern Germany. The area became part of the county Tirol in the thirteen century. Later on the area formed an administrative entity and the castle Schloss Sigmundsried became the center of the administration from 1550 onwards. The castle became home to the seat of the regional tribunal and the name Oberes Gericht derives from the tribunal located in the castle.

== Economy and infrastructure ==
The area is home to some of Austria's most significant hydroelectric power stations. Further on high-quality intensive agriculture and tourism are important economic sectors.
