= Microregion (Tyrol) =

A microregion is an association of several independent communities in Tyrol for the purpose of collaboration and planning among various communities. Currently there are 37 microregions in Tyrol based on a regulation enacted in 2001.
