= Church of St. Catherine of Genoa (Manhattan) =

Church in Manhattan, New York

Coordinates: 40°49′49.72″N 73°56′40.84″W

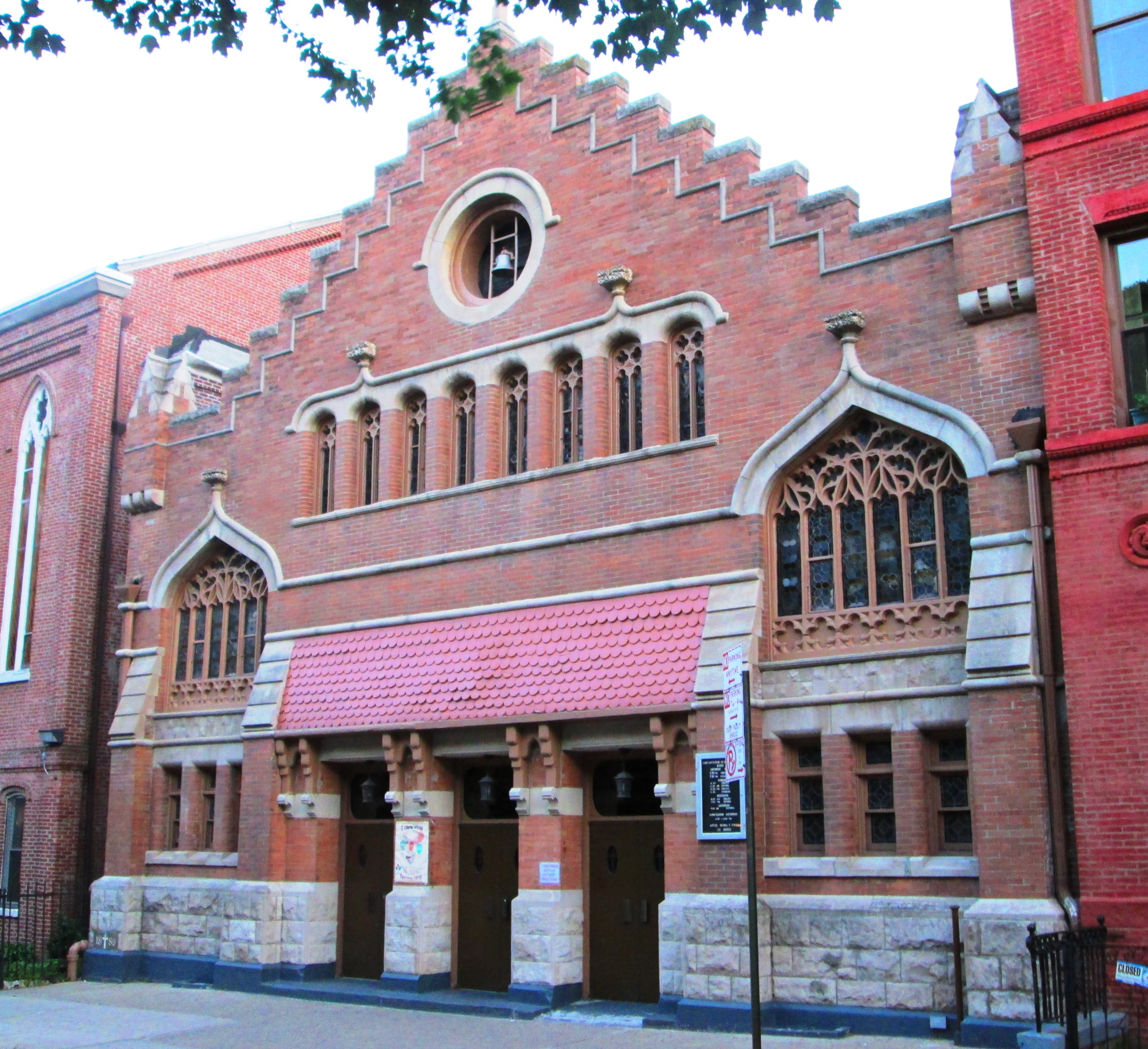
- (2014)
- Interactive map of the Church of St. Catherine of Genoa area

General information
- Architectural style: Eclectic
- Location: Hamilton Heights; Manhattan, New York City, United States
- Construction started: church: 1889 rectory c.1926
- Completed: church: 1890 rectory: c.1926 school: 1937
- Cost: school: $45,000
- Client: Roman Catholic Archdiocese of New York

Technical details
- Structural system: Masonry brick

Design and construction
- Architects: 1890 church: Thomas H. Poole; 1937 school: Jules Lewis

Website
- Church of St. Catherine of Genoa, Manhattan

The Church of St. Catherine of Genoa is a Roman Catholic parish church in the Roman Catholic Archdiocese of New York, located at 504 West 153rd Street, between Broadway and Amsterdam Avenue in the Hamilton Heights neighborhood of Manhattan, New York City.

The AIA Guide to New York City calls the gabled church "a unique star" of the Hamilton Heights neighborhood.

== History ==
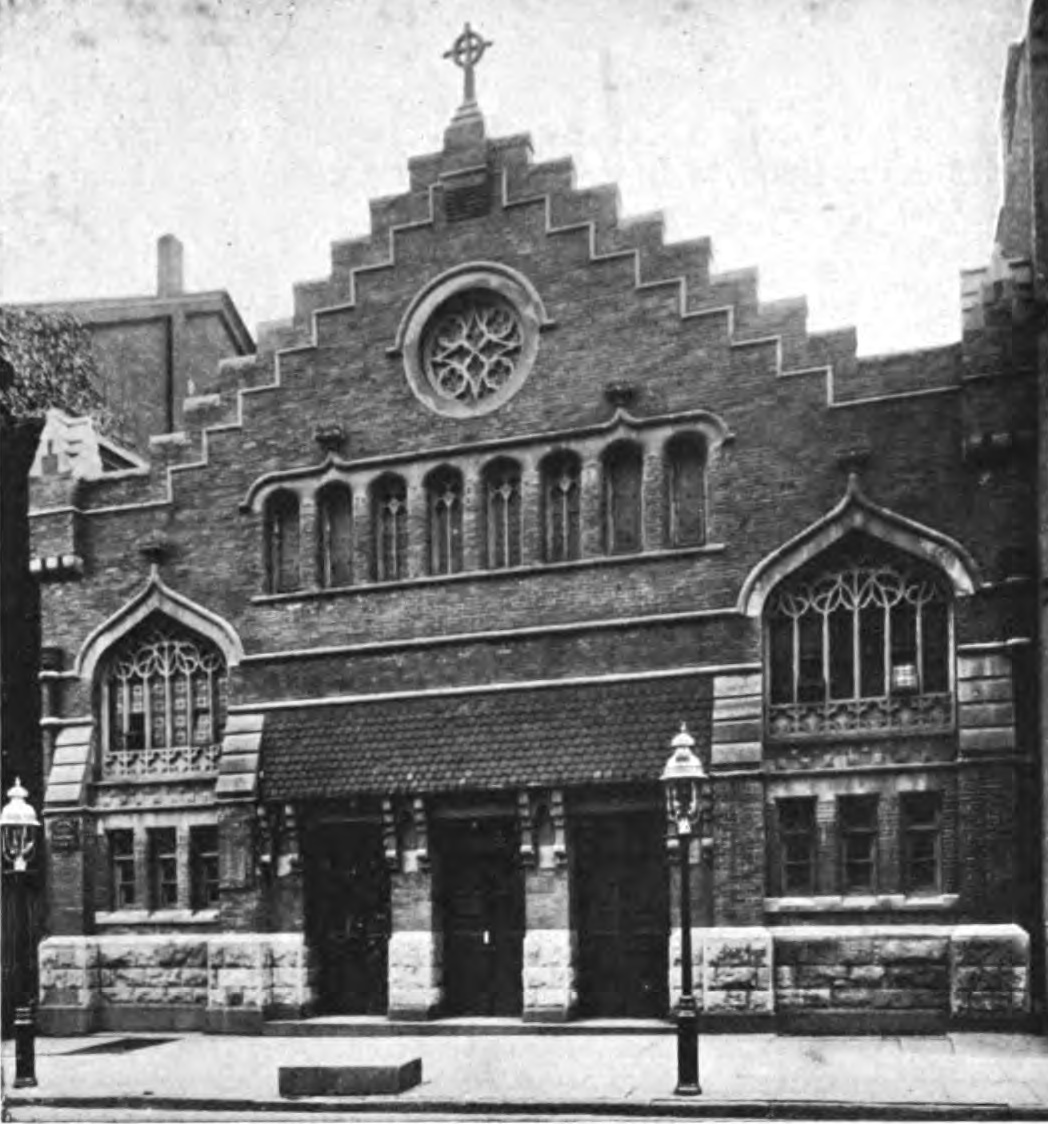
The church c.1914

The parish was established in 1887 from Annunciation and St. Elizabeth parishes south and north of it. Services were held in a local movie theater until a church could be built.

The church was constructed between 1889 and 1890 in an Eclectic style, to the designs by Thomas H. Poole. The design is particularly marked by the building's wide crow-stepped gable and ogee-headed openings, very similar to Poole's more compact Our Lady of Good Counsel (1892), and a predecessor to Poole's grander-scaled St. Thomas the Apostle in Harlem, now closed. The facade is "golden-hued brick", and the building features a "deep porch sheltered by a bracketed entryway."

== School ==
A parish school run by the Sisters of Mercy, opened in 1910. In 1937 the Rev. John J. Brady had a four-story brick schoolhouse built at 508-510 West 153rd Street to designs by Jules Lewis known as the Annex, it opened in 1938. In 1946, all classes were consolidated in the Annex and the original school became Bishop Dubois High School. The parish school finally closed in 2006.

== Rectory ==
The rectory next door at 506 West 153rd Street was built c.1926.

== Parish ==
The parishioners of St. Catherine of Genoa were Irish immigrants when the church was established. Today there is a mix of African-Americans, Puerto Ricans, Dominicans and Haitians. Services are held in English, Spanish, French and Haitian/Creole.
