= Lithuanian Americans =

Amerikos lietuviai (Lithuanian)
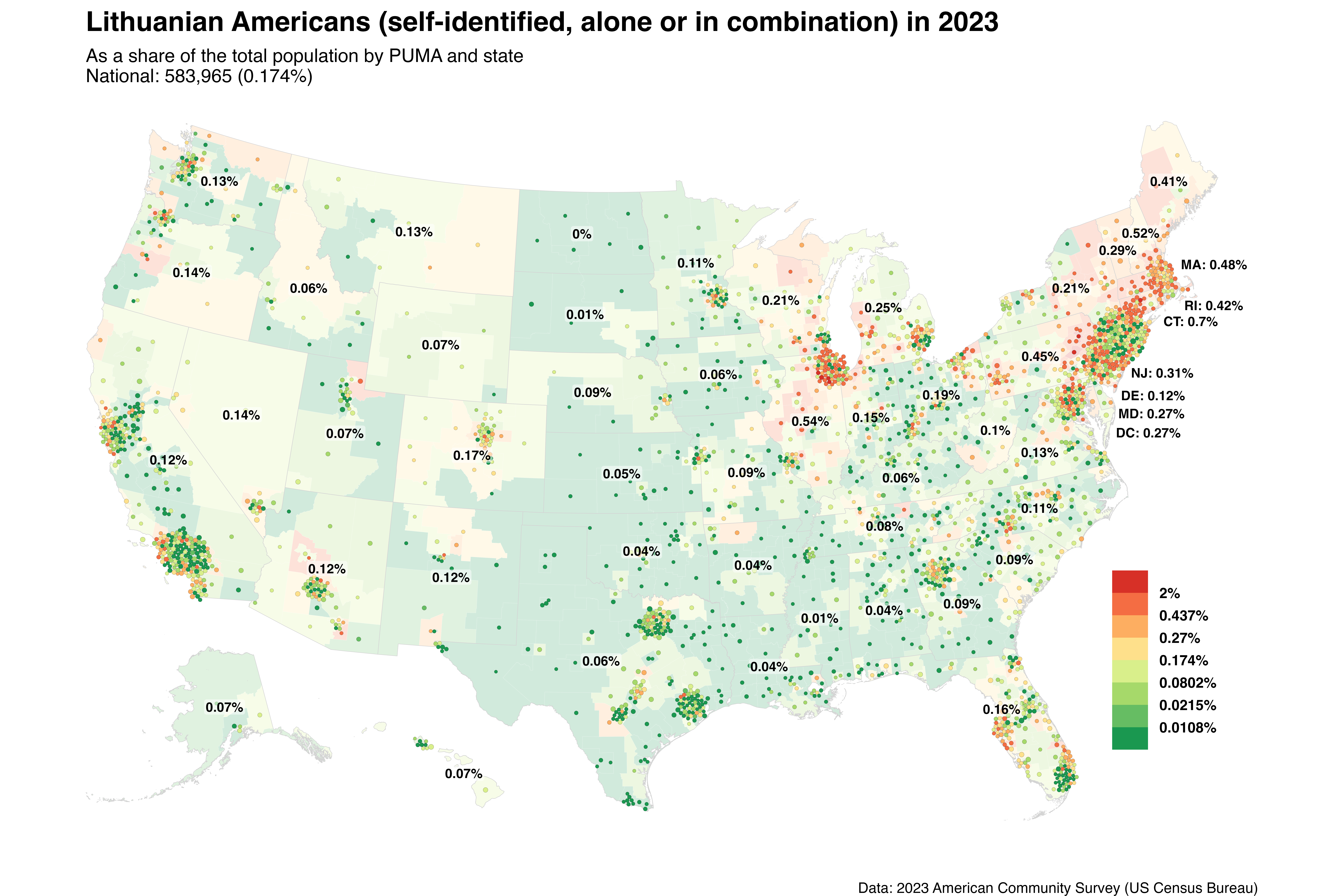

Total population
- 711,089 alone or in any combination 174,487 alone 2020 Census

Regions with significant populations
- Northeast; Midwest

Languages
- American English; Lithuanian

Religion
- Majority Roman Catholic

Related ethnic groups
- Lithuanian Australians; Lithuanian Britons; Lithuanian Canadians; Latvian Americans

Lithuanian Americans refer to American citizens and residents of Lithuanian descent or were born in Lithuania.

New Philadelphia, Pennsylvania has the largest percentage of Lithuanian Americans (20.8%) in its population in the United States. Chicago has historically had the largest number of Lithuanian Americans and the largest Lithuanian diaspora in the world. Lithuanian Americans form by far the largest group within the Lithuanian diaspora. Some of the most prominent Lithuanian-Americans include American actor Charles Bronson, song-writer Ryan Karazija, and cartoonist Kaz.

== History ==
It is believed that Lithuanian emigration to the United States began in the 17th century when Alexander Curtius arrived in New Amsterdam (present day New York City) in 1659 and became the first Latin School teacher-administrator; he was also a physician.

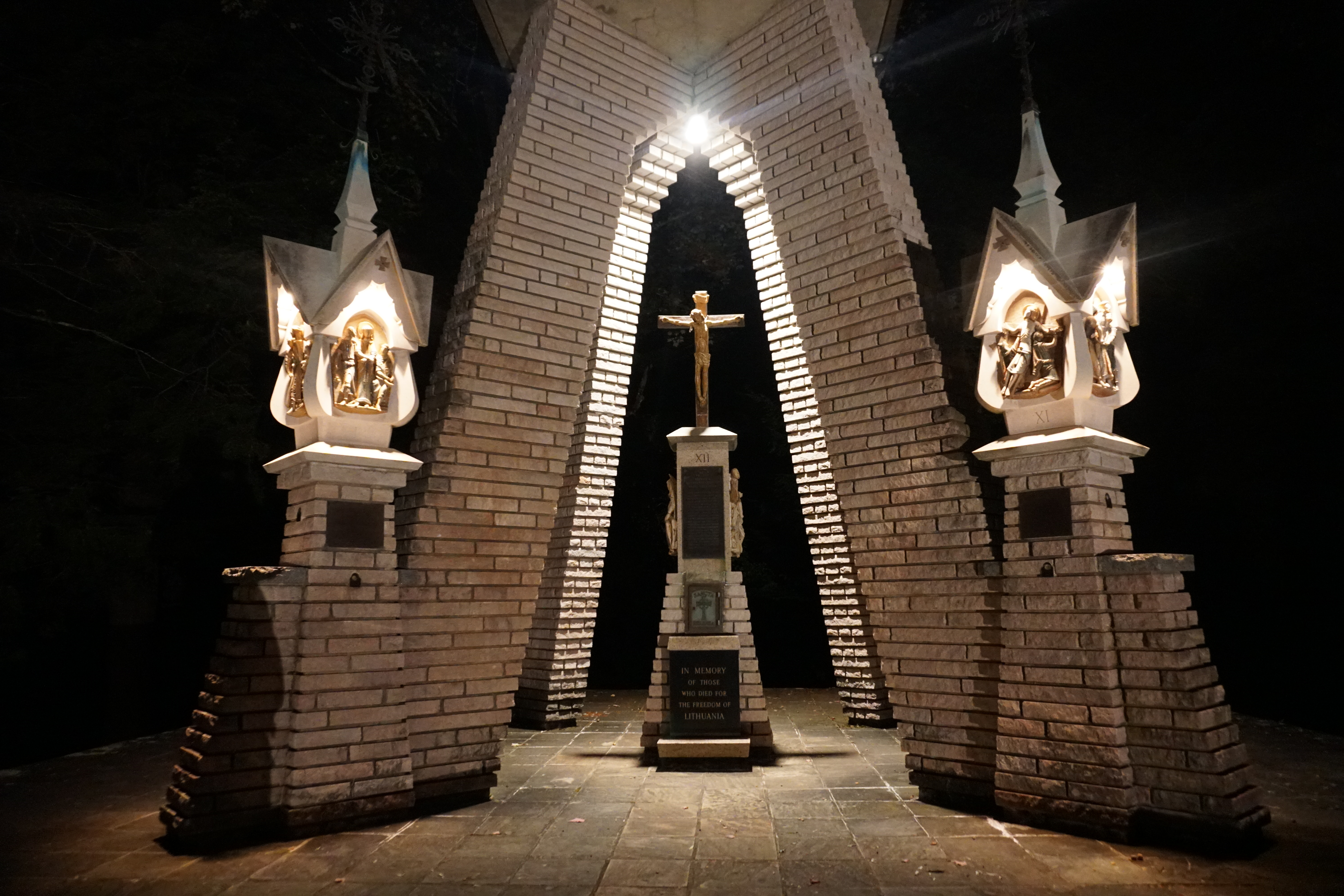
Monument in Kennebunkport, Maine, dedicated for Lithuanians who died fighting for Lithuania's freedom

After the fall of the Polish–Lithuanian Commonwealth in 1795, most of Lithuania was incorporated into the Russian Empire. The beginnings of industrialization and commercial agriculture based on Stolypin's reforms, as well as the abolition of serfdom in 1861, freed the peasants and turned them into migrant-laborers. The pressures of industrialization, the Lithuanian press ban, general discontent, suppression of religious freedom and poverty drove numerous Lithuanians, especially after the famine in 1867–1868, to emigrate from the Russian Empire to the United States continuing until the outbreak of the First World War. The emigration continued despite the Tsarist attempts to control the border and prevent such a drastic loss of population. Since Lithuania as a country did not exist at the time, the people who arrived to the U.S. were recorded as either Polish, German or Russian; moreover, due to the language ban in Lithuania and prevalence of Polish language at that time, their Lithuanian names were not transcribed in the same way as they would be today. As a result, information about Lithuanian immigration before 1899 is not available because incoming Lithuanians were not originally registered as Lithuanians. Only after 1918, when Lithuania established its independence, did immigrants to the U.S. start being recorded as Lithuanians. This first wave of Lithuanian immigrants to the United States ceased when the U.S. Congress passed the Emergency Quota Act in 1921, followed by the Immigration Act of 1924. The Immigration Act of 1924 was aimed at restricting the Eastern Europeans and Southern Europeans who had begun to enter the country in large numbers beginning in the 1890s.

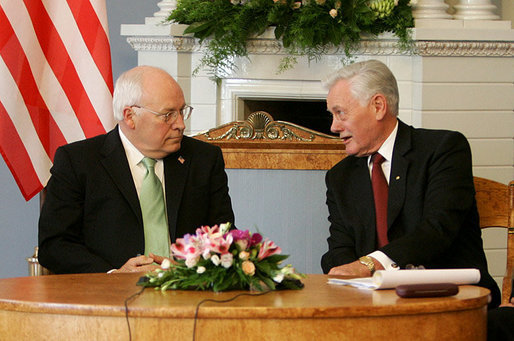
Valdas Adamkus was a Lithuanian American working in the EPA before being elected President of Lithuania. Adamkus (right) is pictured with U.S. Vice President Dick Cheney during the 2006 Vilnius Conference.

A second wave of Lithuanians emigrated to the United States as a result of the events surrounding World War II – the Soviet occupation of Lithuania in 1940 and the Nazi occupation that followed in 1941. After the war's end and the subsequent reoccupation of Lithuania by the Soviet Union, these Displaced Persons were allowed to immigrate from DP camps in Germany to the United States and to apply for American citizenship thanks to a special act of Congress which bypassed the quota system that was still in place until 1967. The Displaced Persons Act of 1948 ultimately led to the immigration of approximately 36,000 Lithuanians. Before that, the nationality quota was only 384 Lithuanians per year.

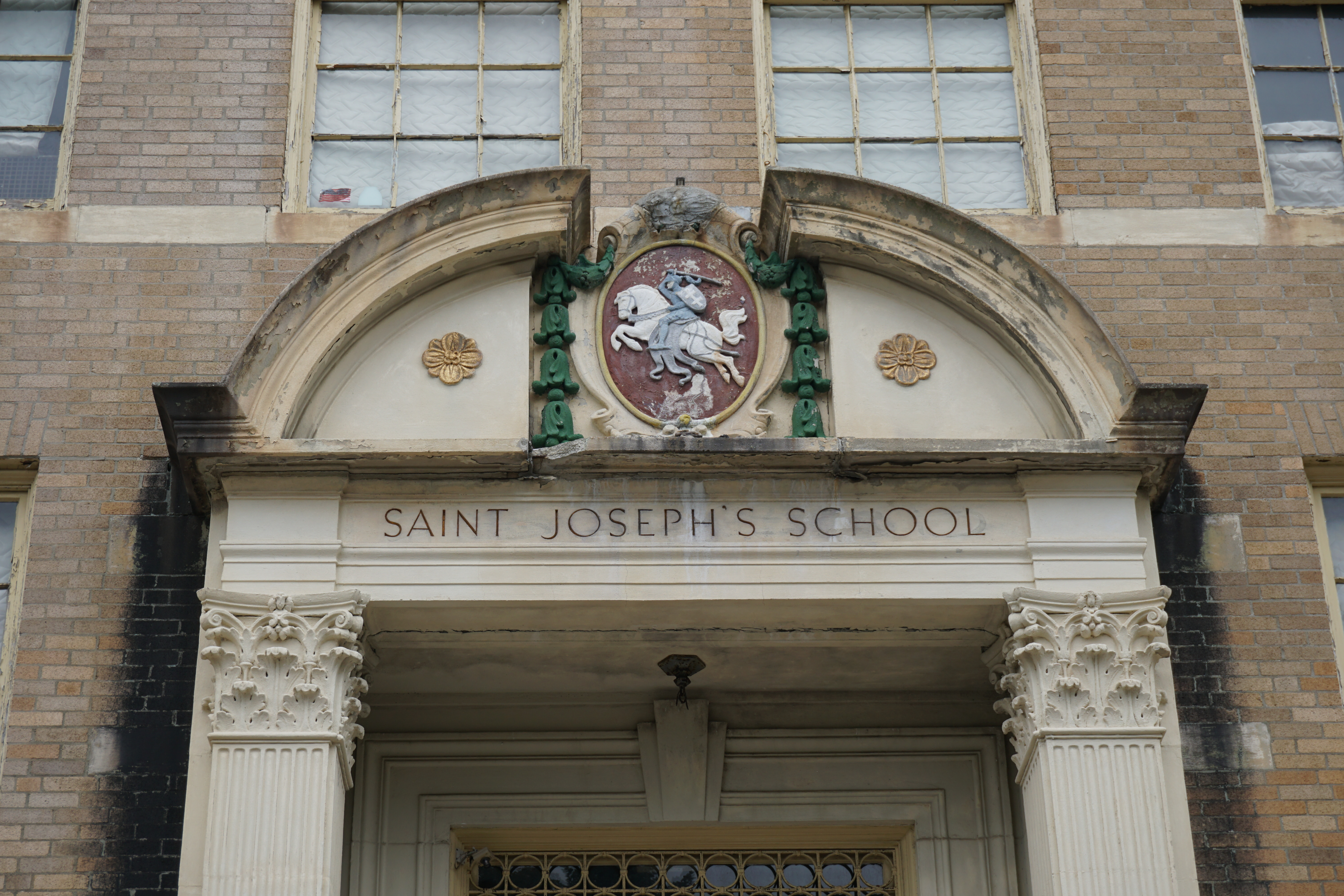
Lithuanian school in Waterbury, Connecticut, United States, with the Coat of arms of Lithuania

The community was still relatively small in 1990, with 842,209 Lithuanian Americans according to the U.S. Census; of these, 30,344 were foreign-born and 811,865 were born in the United States. This number was up from the 1980 figure of 742,776. The five states with the largest populations of Lithuanian Americans in both 1980 and 1990 (in descending order) were Illinois, Pennsylvania, New York, Massachusetts, and California.

Immigration of Lithuanians into the U.S. resumed after Lithuania regained its independence during the dissolution of the Soviet Union in 1990. This wave of immigration has tapered off recently with tougher U.S. immigration requirements and the entry of Lithuania into the EU have made countries such as Ireland and the United Kingdom a more accessible option for potential Lithuanian emigrants.

Lithuanian Days in Pennsylvania is the longest-running ethnic festival in the United States.

== Distribution ==
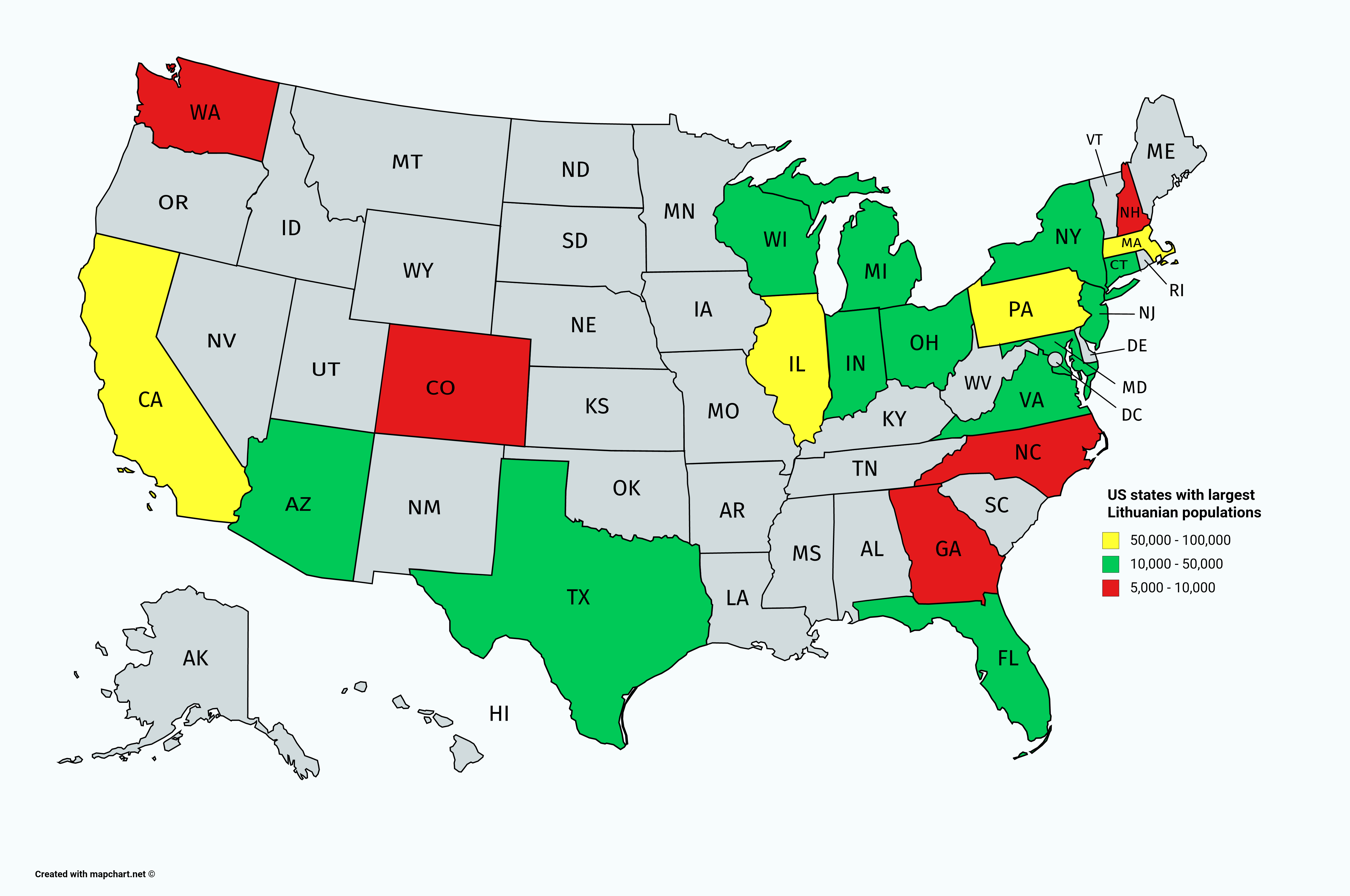
US states with largest Lithuanian populations

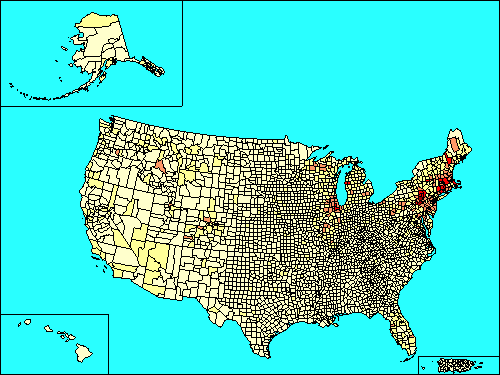
Distribution of Lithuanian Americans according to the 2000 census

Chicago has the largest Lithuanian community in the United States and with approximately 100,000 self-identified ethnic Lithuanians has the largest population of Lithuanians of any municipality outside Lithuania itself. The old "Lithuanian Downtown" in Bridgeport was once the center of Lithuanian political activity for the whole United States. Another large Lithuanian community can be found in the Coal Region of northeastern Pennsylvania, particularly in Schuylkill County where the small borough of New Philadelphia has the largest per capita percentage of Lithuanian Americans (20.8%) in the United States. There is also a large community of Lithuanian descent in the coal mining regions of Western Pennsylvania, northern West Virginia Panhandle and Northeastern Ohio tri-state area. Grand County, Colorado's Lithuanian-American community has the unusual distinction in that it is the only sizable immigrant population in an otherwise fairly homogeneous population in a rural, mountainous community. There is also a small but vibrant Lithuanian community in Presque Isle, Maine. Many Lithuanian refugees settled in Southern California after World War II; they constitute a community in Los Angeles. The majority of the Lithuanian community resides around the St. Casimir Lithuanian church in Los Feliz, in so-called "Little Lithuania".

The states with the largest Lithuanian-American populations are:

1. Illinois – 87,294
2. Pennsylvania – 78,330
3. California – 51,406
4. Massachusetts – 51,054
5. New York – 49,083

=== Lithuanian-born population ===
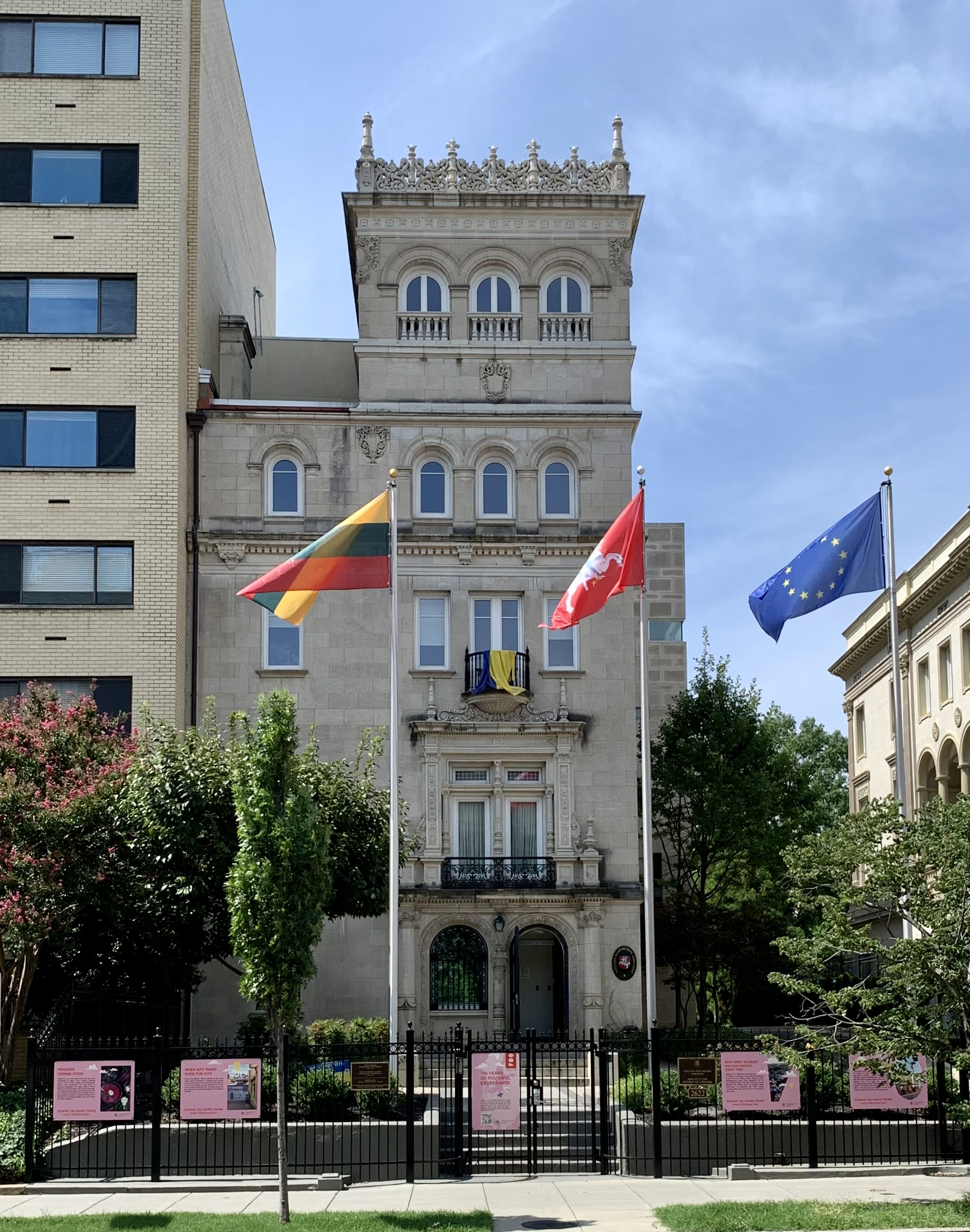
Embassy of Lithuania in Washington, D.C.

Lithuanian-born population in the U.S. since 1920:

Year	Number
1920	135,068
1930	193,606
1960	121,475
1970	76,001
1980	48,194
1990	29,745
2000	28,490
2010	33,888
2011	▲36,303
2012	▲37,158
2013	▼35,514
2014	▲38,186
2015	▼31,458
2016	▲33,640

== See also ==
- Lithuania–United States relations
- Destination Lithuanian America
- American Lithuanian Cultural Archives
- European Americans
- Hyphenated American
- Lithuanians in the Chicago area
- Our Lady of Vilnius Church
