= Thomas Henry Poole =

English architect (1860–1919)

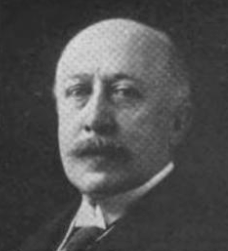
- Born: 1 January 1860; Shrewsbury, England
- Died: 31 July 1919 (aged 59); Manhattan, New York City, US
- Occupation: Architect
- Practice: T.H. Poole Co
- Buildings: Holy Name of Jesus; Our Lady of Good Counsel; Saint Cecilia's

Thomas Henry Poole (1860 – 31 July 1919) was an English-born architect who designed numerous churches and schools in New York City.

Poole was born in Shrewsbury, England, in 1860. He was educated at Rugby and Christ Church, Oxford. Poole is listed in a Manhattan city directory as an architect in 1887, when he was 27, suggesting that he may have had a substantial apprenticeship. In 1886, he resided at 127 West 56th Street. In 1900 he was listed at 15 West 30th Street. In 1918, the T. H. Poole Co. had offices at 13 West 30th Street.

== Works (partial list) ==
Poole was a Roman Catholic, and most of his commissions were for the archdiocese in and around New York. He seldom designed Protestant churches; but these too were in New York City.

=== Brooklyn ===
- St. Cecilia's, 1893, Greenpoint, Brooklyn

=== Bronx ===
- Academy of Mount St. Ursula High School, 1892, East Morrisania section of the Bronx

=== Manhattan ===
- One of the earliest Poole designs is the Holy Name of Jesus Roman Catholic Church on the northwest corner of West 96th Street and Amsterdam Avenue, begun in 1891 and dedicated in 1900. The Gothic design features an interior hammerbeam roof.
- Poole was a parishioner at the Church of Our Lady of Good Counsel, at 232 East 90th Street. It is also Gothic but with huge Tudor-style paired turrets at each end. The church is executed in an unusual Vermont marble, a filmy blue-white with rich veining. It was completed to Poole's design in 1892.
- One of his few commissions not for a Catholic parish was the Harlem Presbyterian Church in 1905. Located at West 122nd Street and Mount Morris Park West, it boasts a strikingly eclectic design with a dome on top of a Romanesque lower section. It is in the Mount Morris Park Historic District.
- The wildly ornate neo-Gothic facade of the 1907 St. Thomas the Apostle, on 118th Street just west of Saint Nicholas Avenue, was for many years a neighbourhood landmark. In 2003 it closed and was slated for demolition.
- St. Catherine of Genoa, 1887, 506 West 153rd Street, Hamilton Heights. The Archdiocese of New York closed the parish school in 2006.
- St. Columba Catholic School, 1910, at 331 West 25th Street in Chelsea. Gothic style, pressed brick with terra cotta trimmings. In 2006, the Archdiocese of New York closed the school.
- Sacred Heart Academy, 1884, 49 West 17th St. 4-story brick. Demolished.
- St. Joseph of the Holy Family School, 1912, 125th Street and Morningside Avenue, Harlem. Closed.

=== Queens ===
- In 1915 he designed the grand limestone facade and sanctuary of Our Lady of Mount Carmel Church in Astoria, Queens, NY.
- 1919: Saint Benedict Joseph Labre Church, listed on the National Register of Historic Places in 2007.

=== Long Island ===
- Sacred Hearts of Jesus and Mary, 1907, 168 Hill Street, Southampton, New York.
- St. Lawrence the Martyr Church in Sayville, New York. Dedicated 1896; destroyed by fire 1967.

=== Westchester ===
- St. John the Evangelist, in White Plains, New York. Consecrated in 1892. English gothic style in Vermont marble.
- The Church of the Transfiguration, 268 S. Broadway, Tarrytown, New York. Built by the Carmelites and dedicated in October 1898, it is a Gothic design done in granite.

=== New Jersey ===
- St. Henry's Church in Bayonne, New Jersey. Started in 1911 and consecrated in 1915. St. Henry's is part of the Roman Catholic Archdiocese of Newark.
- Saint Cecilia's Church, 55 West Demarest Avenue, Englewood, New Jersey, completed 1910. Also a Carmelite church in the Gothic tradition, it was built for the Roman Catholic Archdiocese of Newark.

=== Washington, DC ===
- Gibbons Hall at The Catholic University of America, 620 Michigan Avenue, Northeast, Washington, D.C. Built in 1911 and named for the University's first chancellor, James Gibbons, Cardinal Archbishop of Baltimore (1877–1921). This Gothic Revival building is a student dormitory.
- Sisters of the Holy Cross Academy, 1909, 4-story brick and stone school, Northwest Washington, D.C. Demolished for Howard University campus.

== Writing career ==
Poole also served his Catholic faith as a writer. He contributed articles to The Messenger, a church publication with offices in Manhattan. He wrote a detailed architectural review of the Westminster Cathedral when it opened in London, England, in 1903:

…outside of its practical character it ought certainly to lead to the further development of all that is beautiful in art and to the better interior adornment of our churches… giving us the best possible facilities for the carrying out of all the requirements of our religion to the fullest possible extent with all the solemnity and grandeur that the service of man can invoke and the offering of our best works and thoughts as well as of our bodies and souls to God the Lord and Master of all.

Poole's name also appears as a contributor in the Catholic Encyclopedia: An International Work of Reference, published in 1913. He wrote entries about architectural terms, such as apse chapel, also known as the lady chapel.

Poole died 31 July 1919, at his Manhattan office, 13 West 30th Street. His funeral was held at Saint Cecilia's in Brooklyn, one of his churches.

== Gallery ==
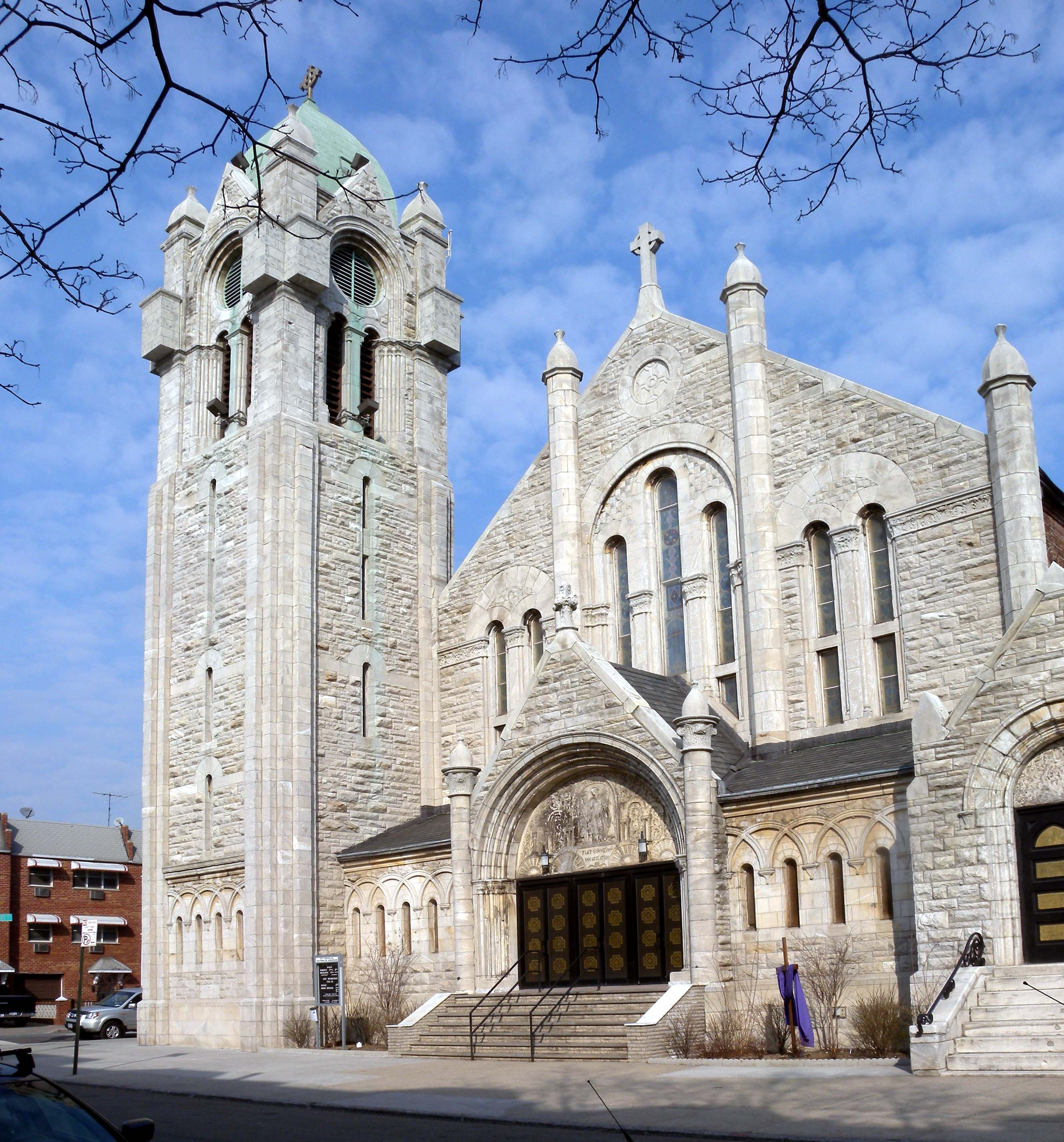
Saint Cecilia's, 1891-1901, at North Henry and Herbert streets, Greenpoint, Brooklyn.

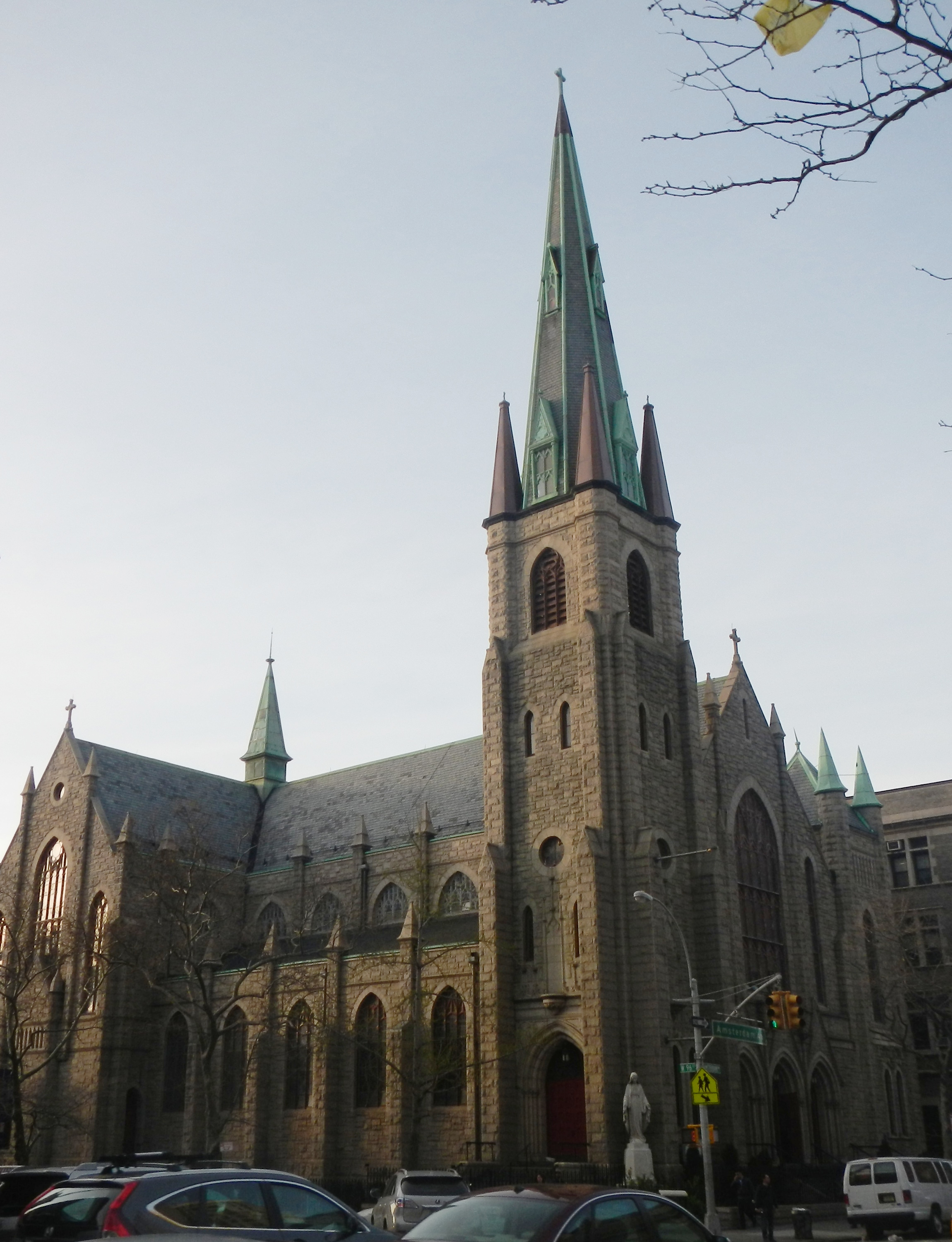
Holy Name of Jesus, 1891-1900, at 96th Street and Amsterdam Avenue, Upper West Side, Manhattan.

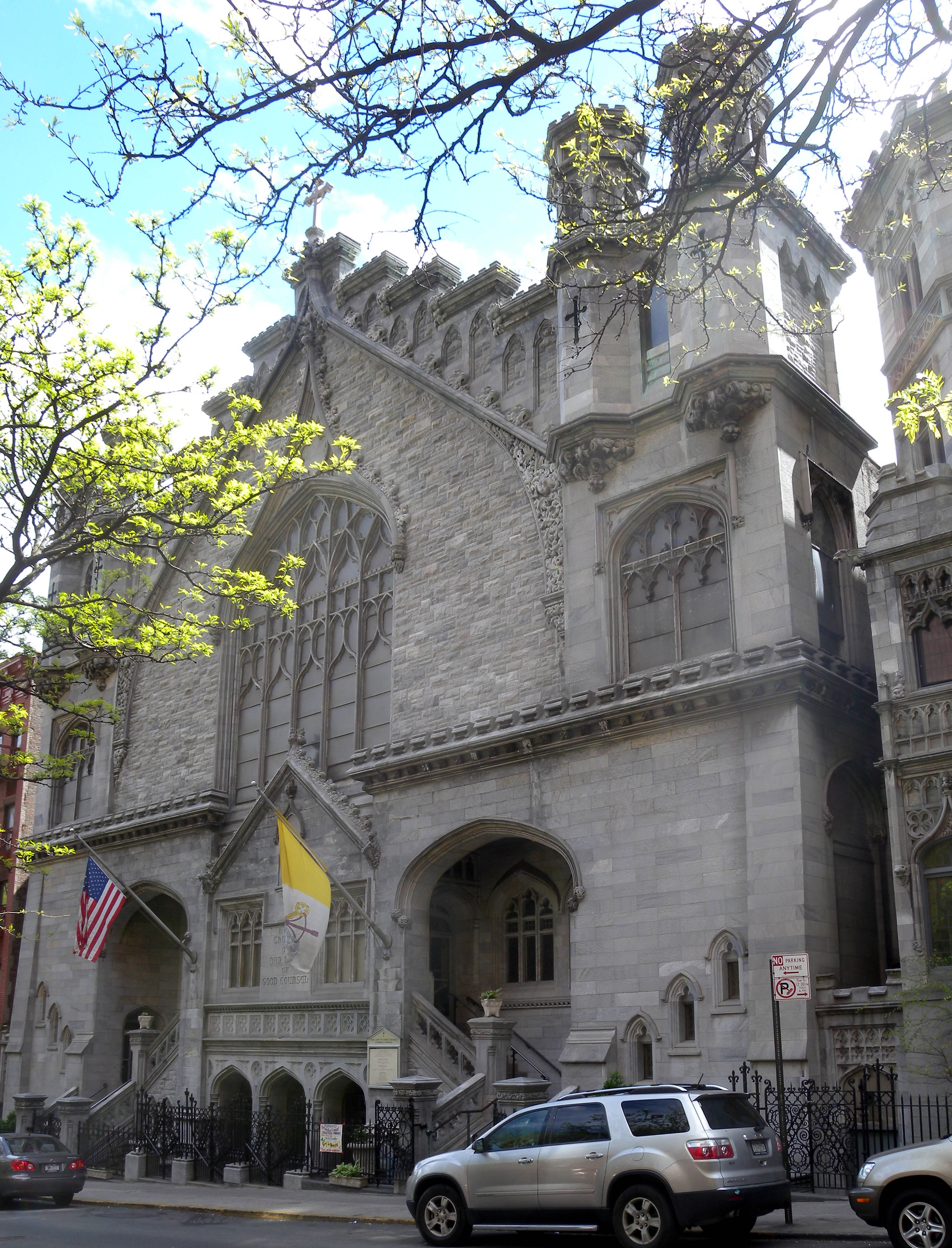
Our Lady of Good Counsel, 1892, at 230 East 90th Street, Upper East Side, Manhattan.
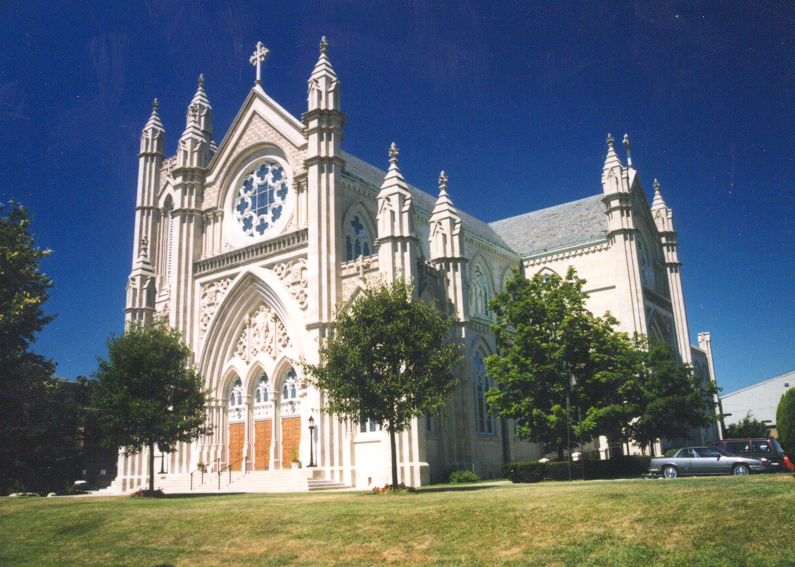
St. Henry's Church, 1915, on Avenue C between 28th and 29th streets in Bayonne, New Jersey.
