= New Philadelphia, Pennsylvania =

Borough in Pennsylvania, US

- Borough
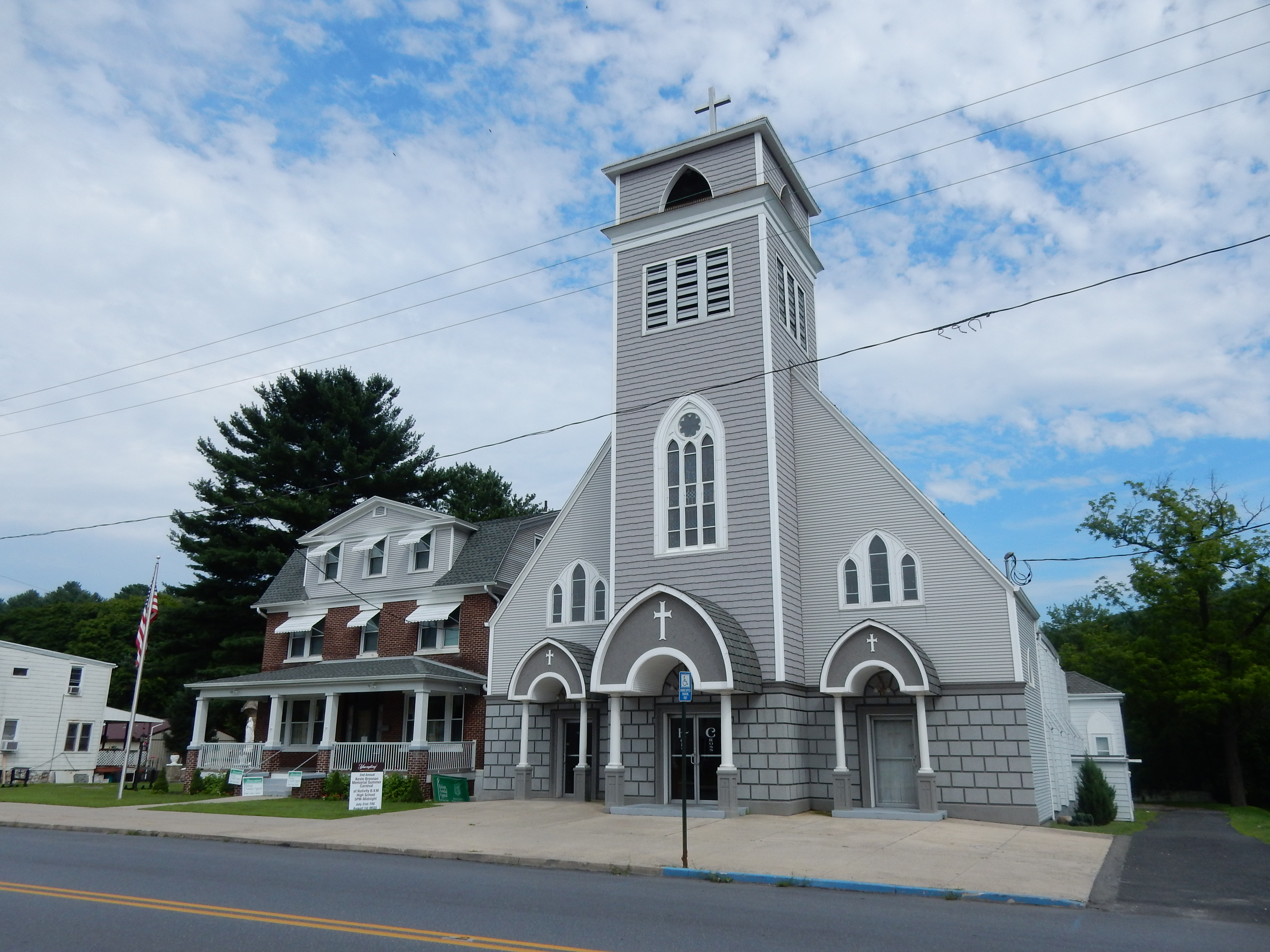
- Valley Street (U.S. Route 209). Holy Cross Church.

- Location of New Philadelphia in Schuylkill County, Pennsylvania.

- Location in Pennsylvania New Philadelphia (the United States)
- Coordinates: 40°43′14″N 76°07′02″W
- Country: United States
- State: Pennsylvania
- County: Schuylkill
- Settled: 1840
- Incorporated: 1868

Government
  - Type: Borough Council
  - Mayor: Will Mongrain

Area
  - Total: 1.51 sq mi (3.90 km^{2})
  - Land: 1.51 sq mi (3.90 km^{2})
  - Water: 0 sq mi (0.00 km^{2})

Population (2020)
  - Total: 1,054
  - Density: 700.4/sq mi (270.44/km^{2})
- Time zone: UTC-5 (Eastern (EST))
  - Summer (DST): UTC-4 (EDT)
- Zip code: 17959
- Area code: 570
- FIPS code: 42-53944
- Website: https://newphiladelphiapaboro.org/

New Philadelphia, also known as New Philly, is a borough in Schuylkill County, Pennsylvania, United States. The population was 1,060 at the 2020 census.

== Geography ==
New Philadelphia is located at 40°43′14″N 76°7′2″W, (40.720594, -76.117295), approximately 70 miles (110 km) northwest of the city of Philadelphia.

According to the United States Census Bureau, the borough has a total area of 1.5 square miles (3.9 km^{2}), all land.

== Demographics ==
Historical population
Census	Pop.	Note	%±
1870	558		—
1880	360		−35.5%
1890	562		56.1%
1900	1,326		135.9%
1910	2,512		89.4%
1920	2,537		1.0%
1930	2,557		0.8%
1940	2,453		−4.1%
1950	2,200		−10.3%
1960	1,702		−22.6%
1970	1,528		−10.2%
1980	1,341		−12.2%
1990	1,283		−4.3%
2000	1,149		−10.4%
2010	1,085		−5.6%
2020	1,054		−2.9%
2021 (est.)	1,062	▲	0.8%

New Philadelphia borough, Pennsylvania – Racial composition Note: the US Census treats Hispanic/Latino as an ethnic category. This table excludes Latinos from the racial categories and assigns them to a separate category. Hispanics/Latinos may be of any race.
Race (NH = Non-Hispanic)	% 2020	% 2010	% 2000	Pop 2020	Pop 2010	Pop 2000
White alone (NH)	89.8%	96.2%	99%	946	1,044	1,137
Black alone (NH)	1.9%	0.2%	0%	20	2	0
American Indian alone (NH)	0.2%	0.6%	0%	2	6	0
Asian alone (NH)	0%	0.1%	0.5%	0	1	6
Pacific Islander alone (NH)	0%	0.4%	0%	0	4	0
Other race alone (NH)	0.4%	0%	0%	4	0	0
Multiracial (NH)	3.1%	0.9%	0.2%	33	10	2
Hispanic/Latino (any race)	4.6%	1.7%	0.3%	49	18	4

The most reported ancestries in 2020 were:

- Irish (22.4%)
- German (19.5%)
- Lithuanian (17.1%)
- Polish (11%)
- English (7.4%)
- Italian (6.7%)
- Puerto Rican (2.8%)
- Pennsylvania German (2.3%)
- Dutch (2.2%)

At the 2010 census there were 1,085 people, 477 households, and 300 families residing in the borough. The population density was 729.85 inhabitants per square mile (281.80/km^{2}). There were 477 housing units at an average density of 393.5 per square mile (151.9/km^{2}). The racial makeup of the borough was 91.14% White, 0.55%, and 0.92% from two or more races. Hispanic or Latino of any race were 1.66%.

Of the 477 households, 21.38% had children under the age of 18 living with them, 43.0% were married couples living together, 11.7% had a female householder with no husband present, and 37.11% were non-families. 33.54% of households were one person, and 16.35% were one person aged 65 or older. The average household size was 2.27 and the average family size was 2.84.

In the borough the population was spread out, with 18.71% under the age of 18, 3.78% from 18 to 20, 53.46% from 21 to 61, 5.25% from 62 to 64, and 18.8% 65 or older. The median age was 44.9 years. For every 100 females there were 99.1 males. For every 100 females age 18 and over, there were 100 males.

From the 2000 census, the median household income was $27,159 and the median family income was $38,229. Males had a median income of $29,107 versus $20,192 for females. The per capita income for the borough was $17,899. About 6.3% of families and 10.6% of the population were below the poverty line, including 17.0% of those under age 18 and 13.3% of those age 65 or over.

In 2000, 20.8% of New Philadelphia residents identified as being of Lithuanian heritage. This was the highest percentage of Lithuanian Americans per capita in the country.

== History ==
New Philadelphia had historically been an anthracite mining town.

Because of the high number of Lithuanians and Irish in the area, there was much separation of the two nationalities. This tension ultimately resulted in the forming of two separate Catholic churches; Sacred Heart (Lithuanian) and Holy Family (Irish). There was also a town-wide brawl that occurred as a result of this tension. The dispute was settled by the priests from Sacred Heart and Holy Family calling their respective patrons to stop fighting and buying each other a beer.

In 2008, the two Catholic parishes were merged to create Holy Cross Roman Catholic Church.

In 2012, the Souls Harvest Baptist Church relocated to New Philadelphia from Port Carbon. They are now located at the corner of Kimber and Clay streets in the building that once housed a Methodist church. This building is the oldest building in town.

== Gallery ==
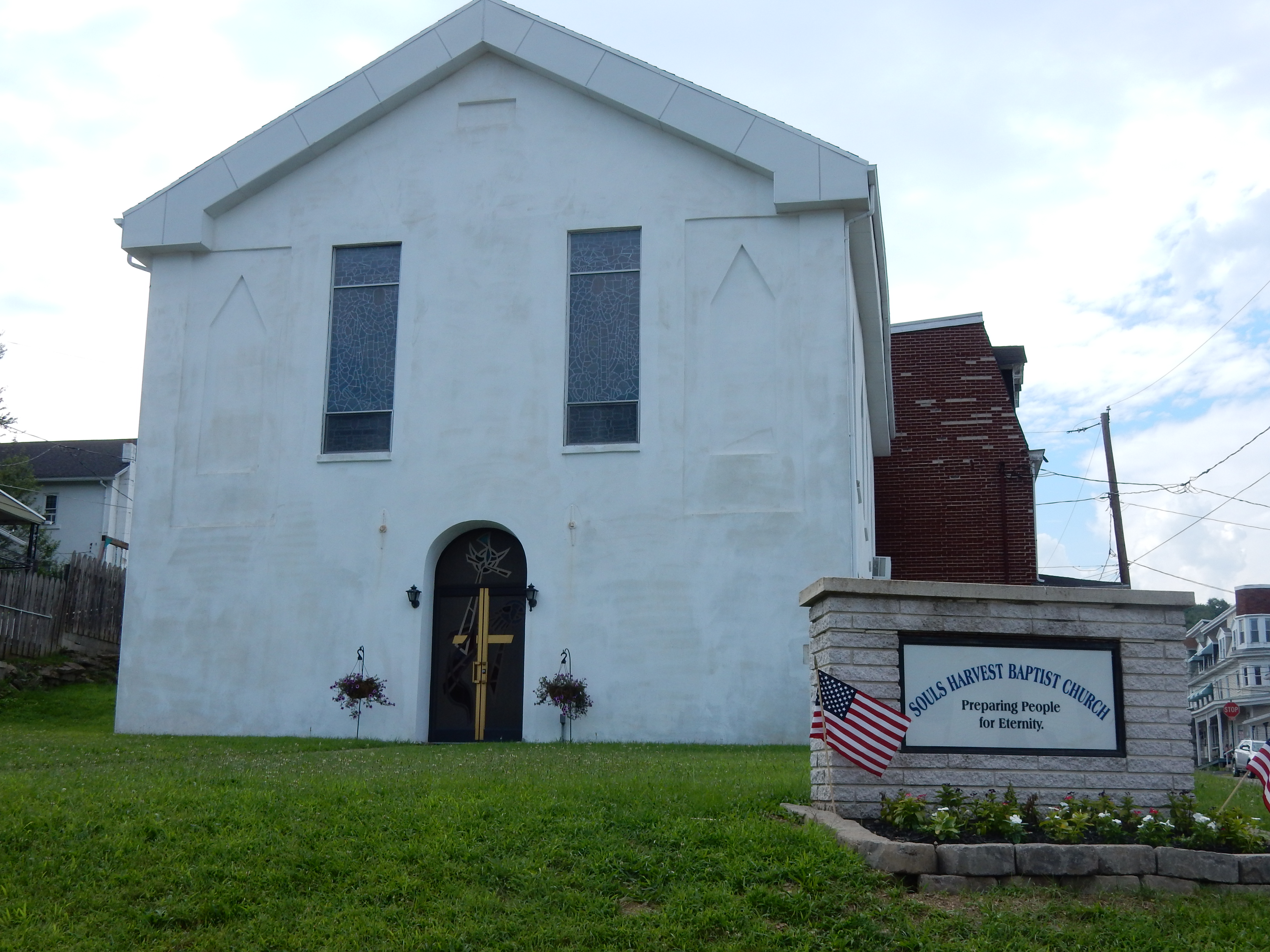
Souls Harvest Baptist Church.

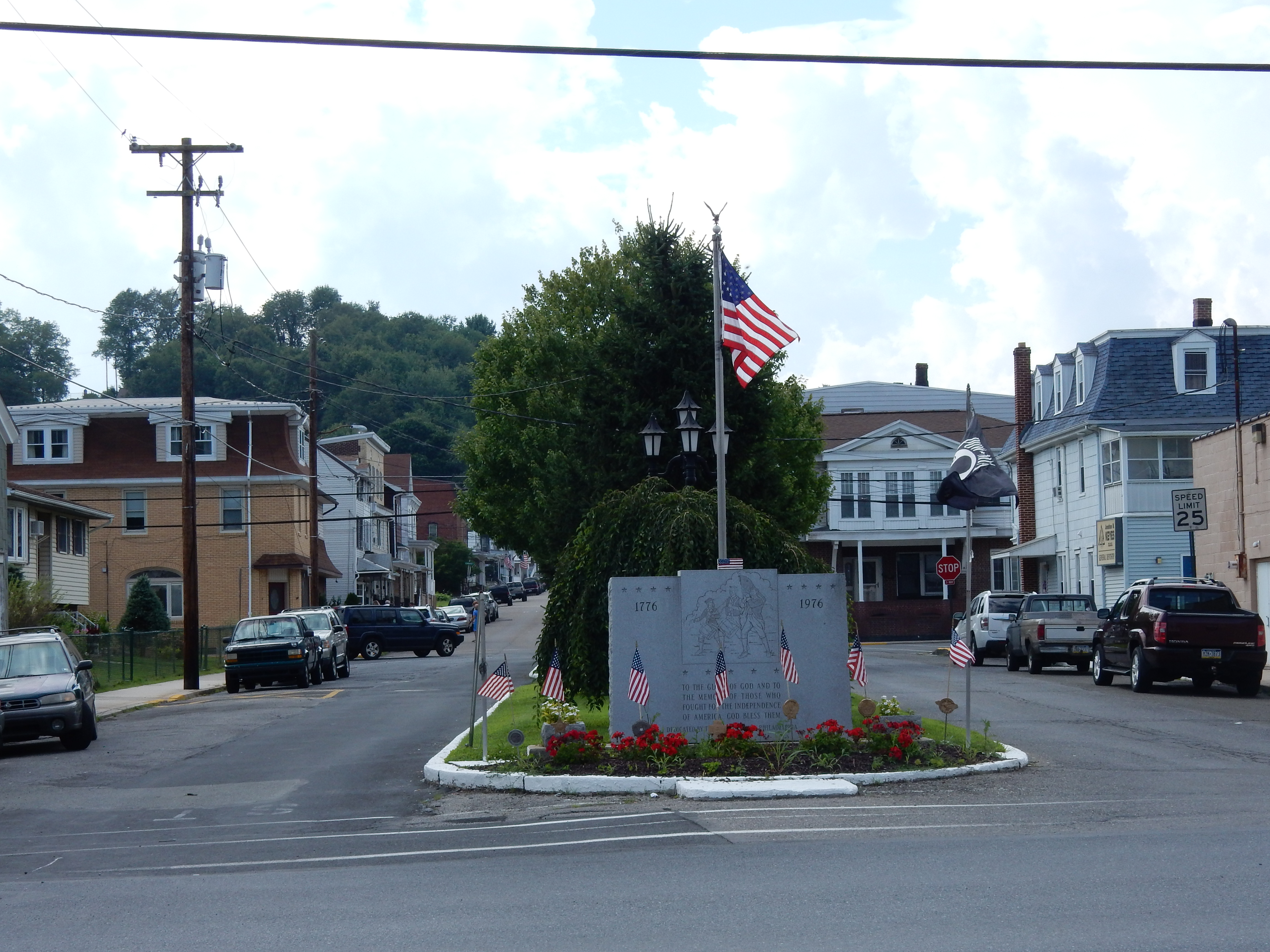
War Memorial on Water Street.

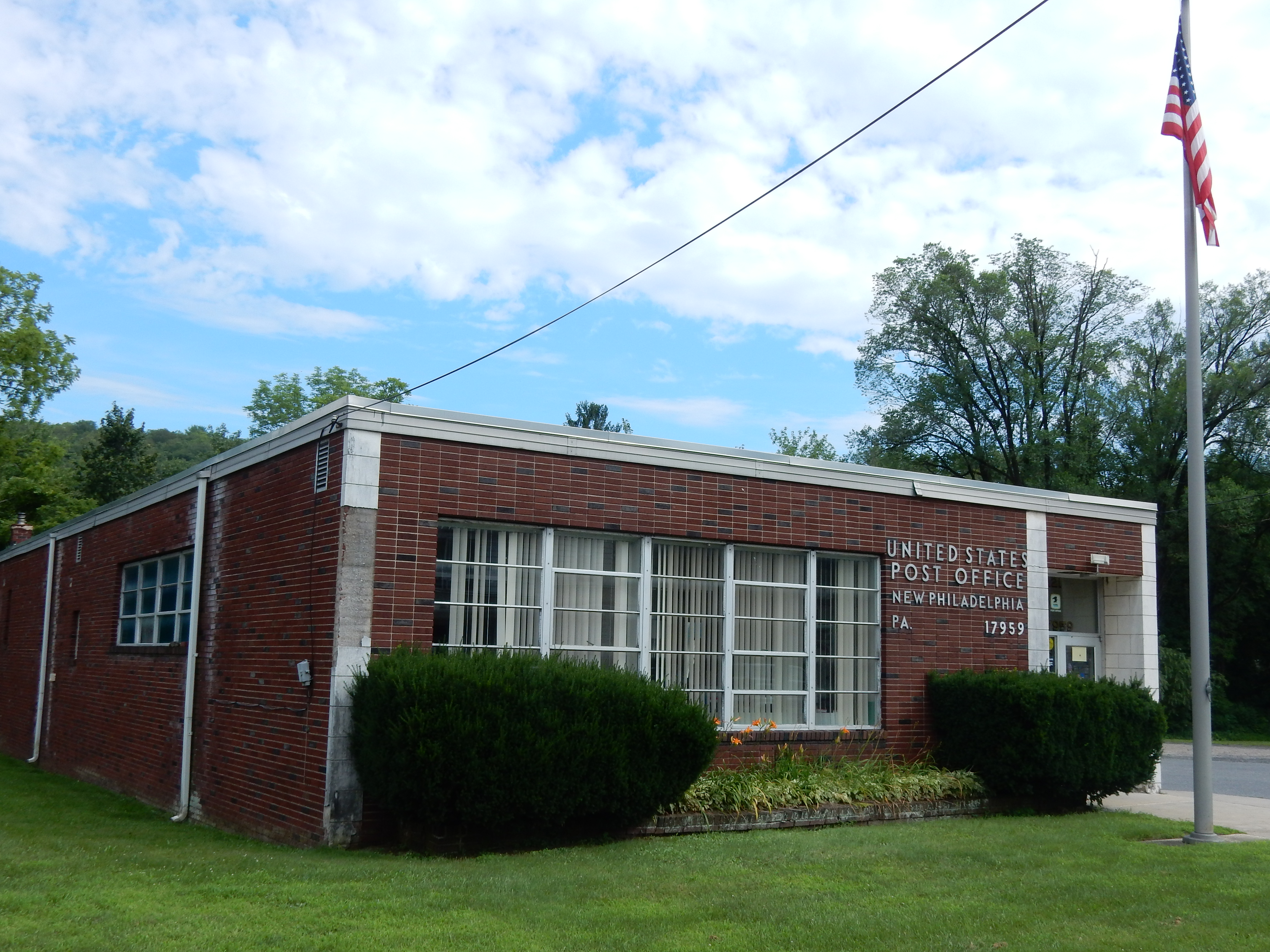
New Philadelphia Post Office.

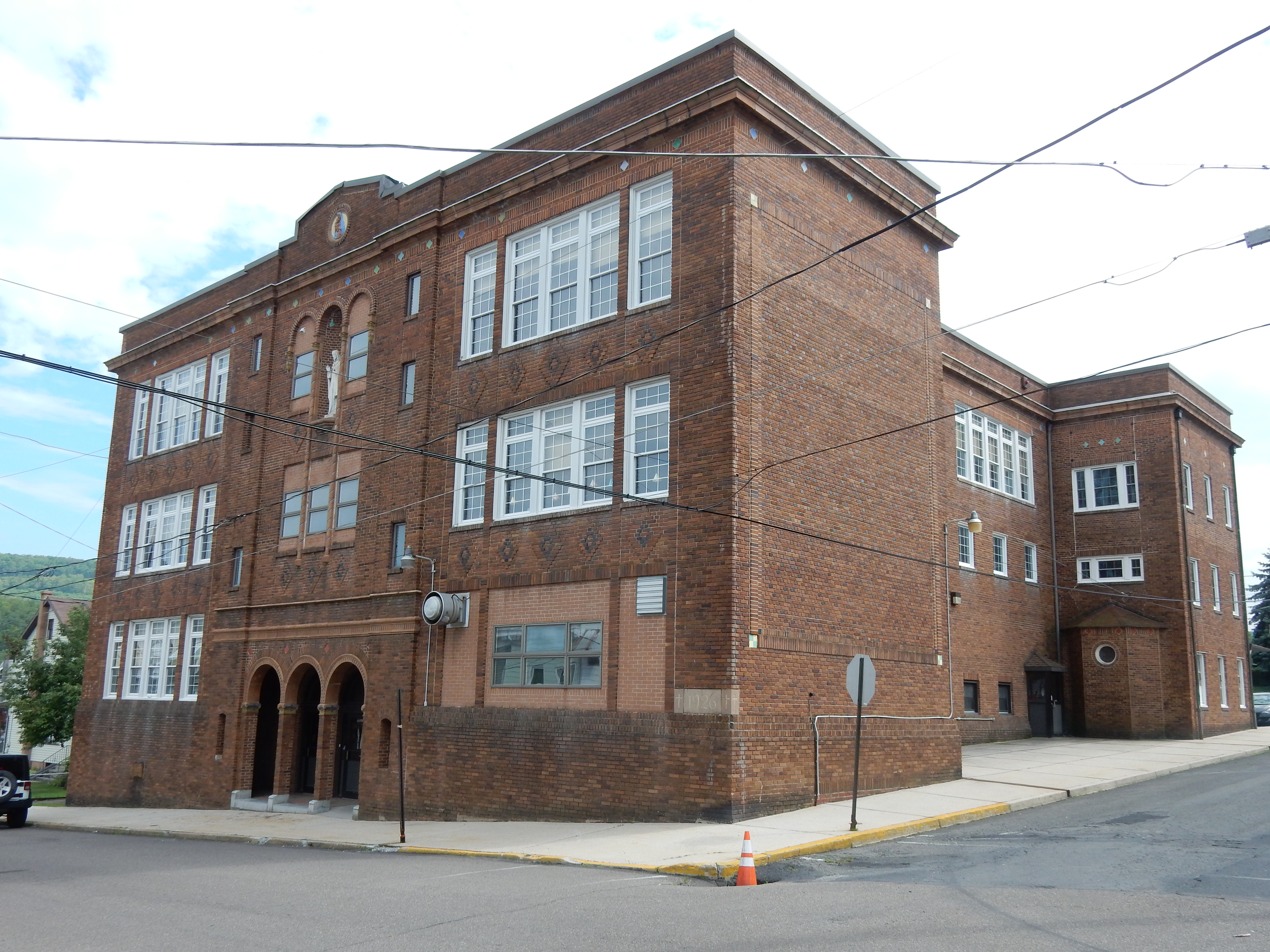
The former Holy Cross Catholic School.

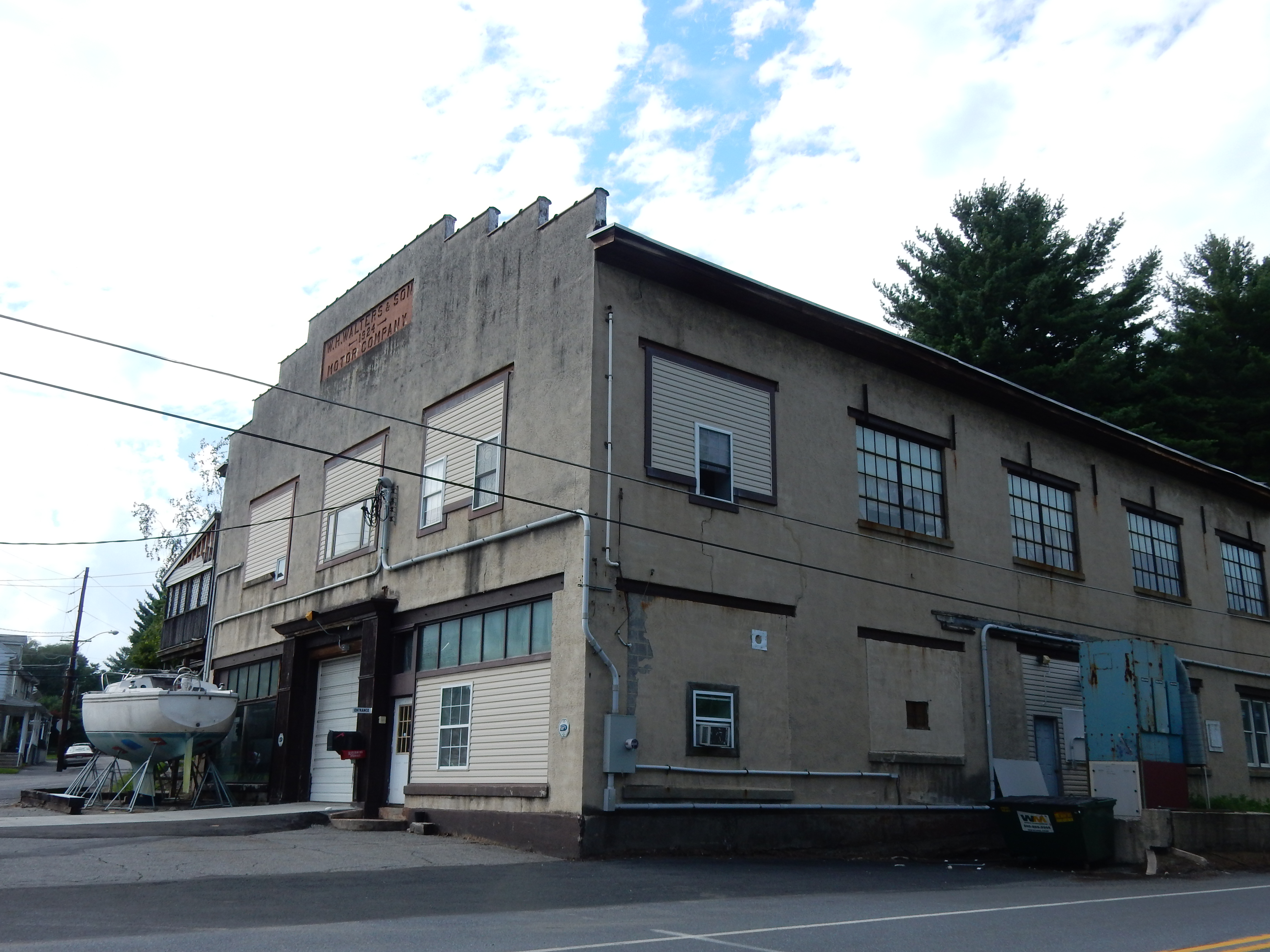
The former W.H.Walters & Son Motor Co. (1924).
