= Saint Benedict Joseph Labre Church (Queens) =

Historic church in New York, United States

- Saint Benedict Joseph Labre Parish
- U.S. National Register of Historic Places
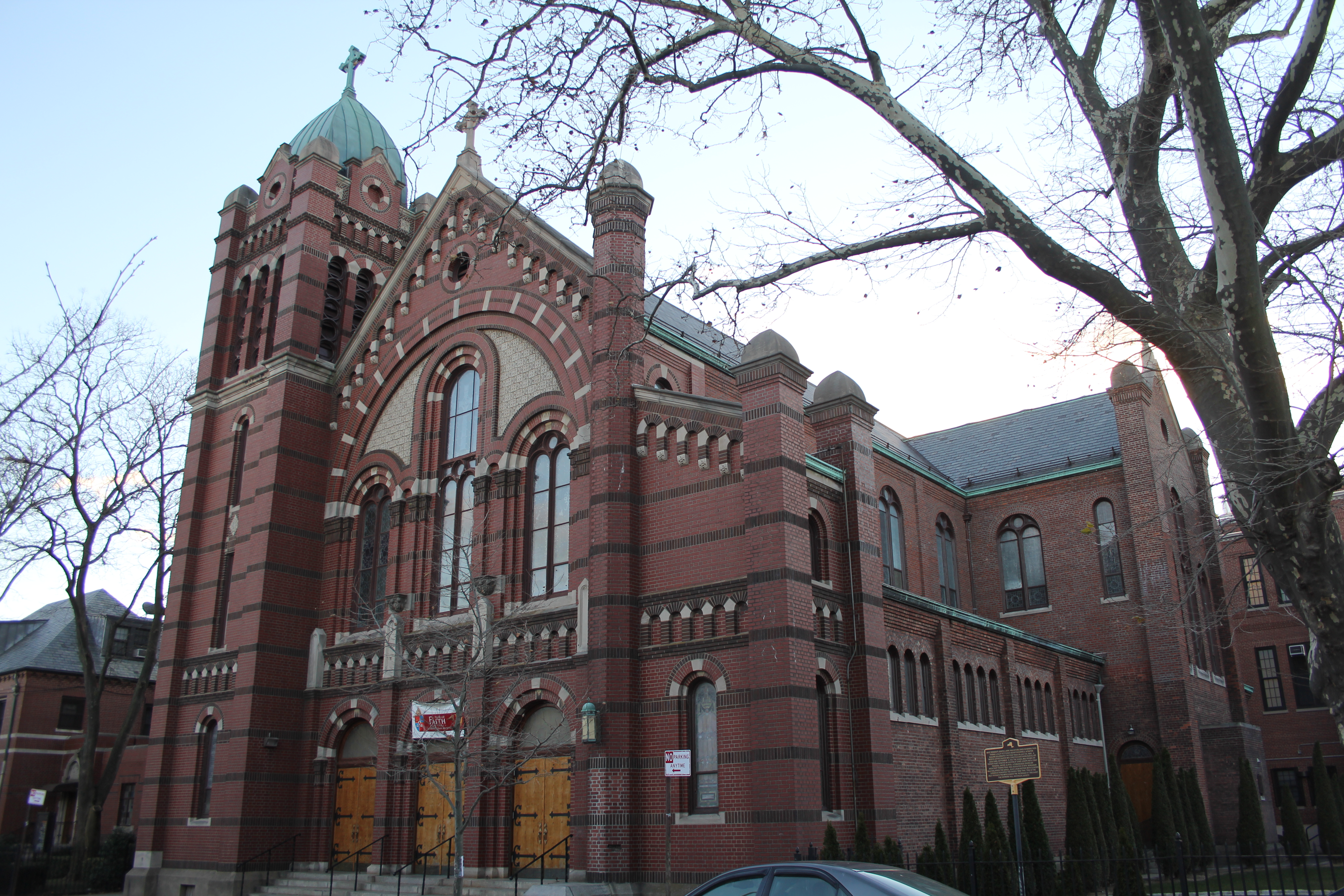
- Facade from 118th Street

- Location within New York City Location within New York Location within the United States
- Location: 94-40 118th St., Richmond Hill, New York
- Coordinates: 40°41′33″N 73°49′47″W
- Area: 1.1 acres (0.45 ha)
- Built: 1916
- Architect: Thomas Henry Poole et al.
- Architectural style: Romanesque, Classical Revival
- NRHP reference No.: 06001297
- Added to NRHP: January 25, 2007

Saint Benedict Joseph Labre Parish is a historic Roman Catholic parish church complex in the Diocese of Brooklyn, located at 94-40 118th Street in Richmond Hill, Queens, New York City.

== Description ==
The complex consists of the church, rectory / parsonage, school, and cloister. The church was designed in 1916 by architect Thomas Henry Poole (1860–1919) and completed in 1919. It is a large brick Romanesque-style building in the basilican plan. It features a standing seam copper-roofed dome and a bell tower. The rectory is a 2 1/2-story brick building built in 1939. The cloister also dates to 1939 and connects the rectory to the sanctuary. It features a 1938 statue of the patron Saint Benedict Joseph Labre. The brick school building was built in 1912 and substantially enlarged in 1938–1939.

It was listed on the National Register of Historic Places in 2007.

== Gallery ==
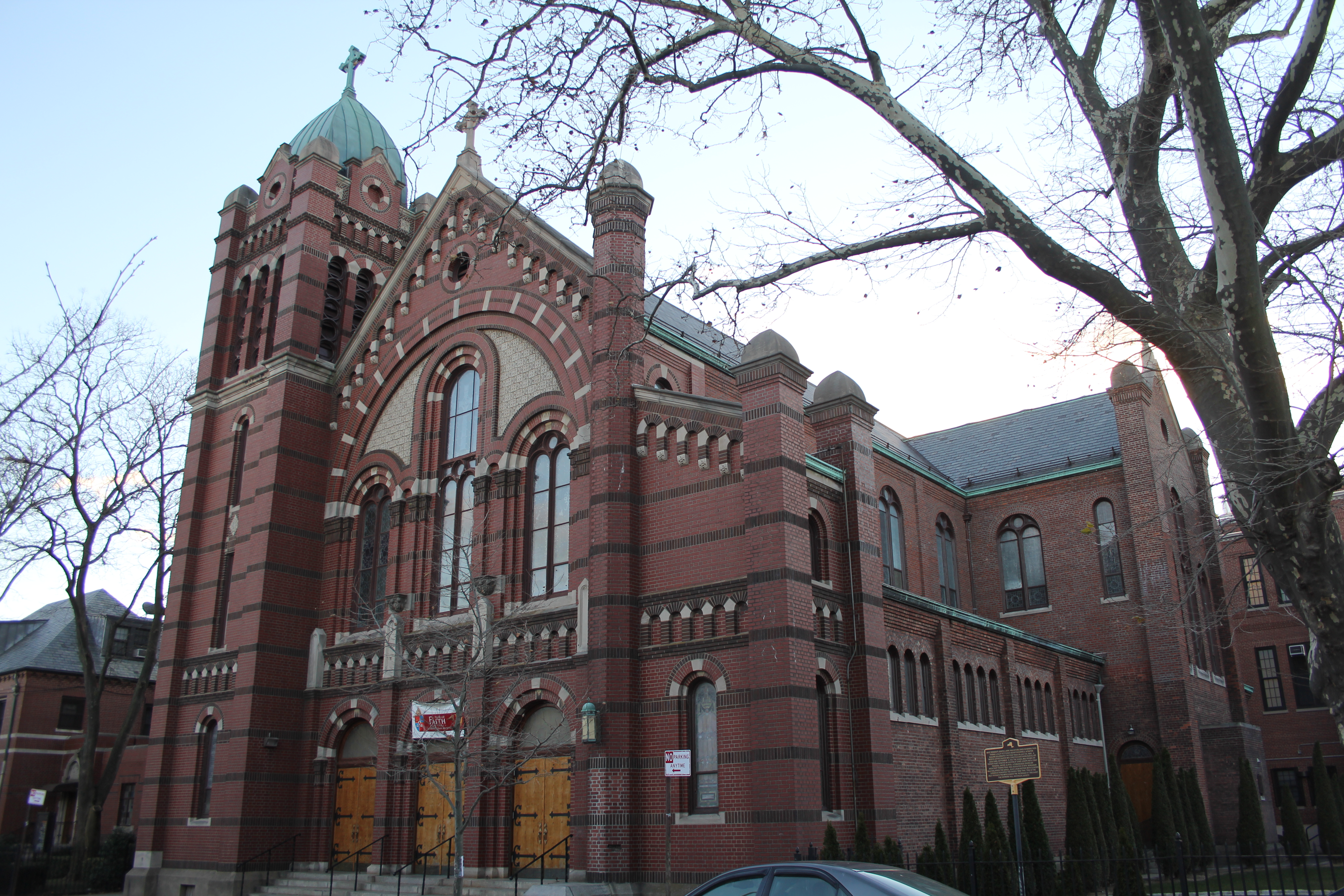
Facade from 118th Street

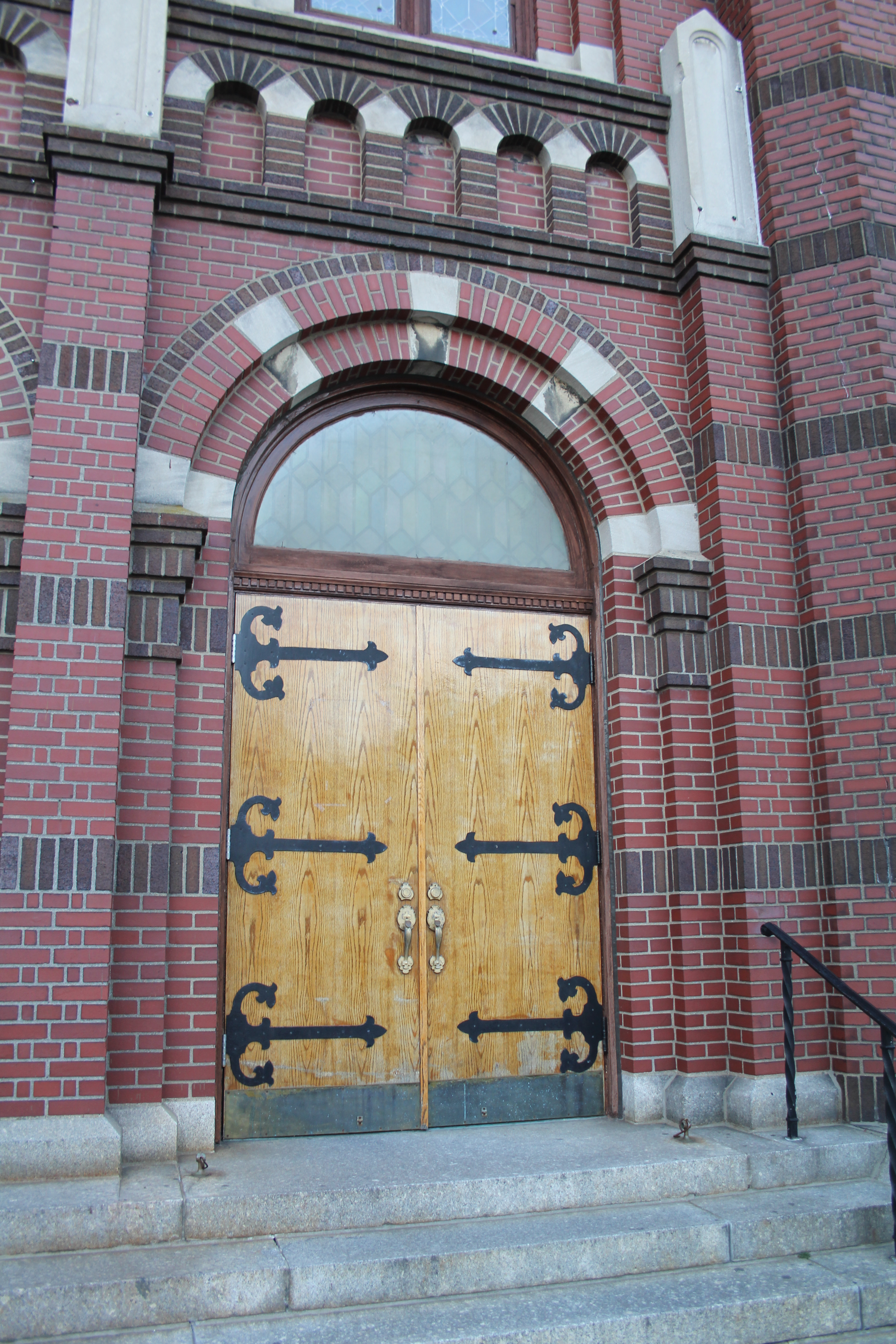
Detail of door
