= Destination Lithuanian America =

Online interactive map of Lithuanian heritage sites in USA

Destination Lithuanian America (Lithuanian: "Tikslas - Amerika") is an online interactive map of Lithuanian heritage sites of America.

Destination Lithuanian America includes 650 sites such as Lithuanian-American churches, cemeteries, monuments, monasteries, club buildings, plaques, graves of the famous Lithuanian-Americans, Lithuanian-named localities in America. The aim of the map is to include each site meeting its criteria.

Destination Lithuanian America is being created during field trips where volunteers from Lithuania visit each site in person, taking photographs and learning the history of the site from the local Lithuanian-Americans. This information is then made available online.

- 2017 expedition covered New England and Mid-Atlantic and added 300+ sites with a participation of some 200 Lithuanian-Americans.
- 2018 expedition covered Midwest and added 200+ sites with a participation of some 300 Lithuanian-Americans.
- 2019 expedition covered Canada, western New York and northern New England, adding ~100 new sites.
- 2021 expedition (postponed from 2020 due to COVID) covered southern and western USA.
- 2022 expedition revisited Mid-Atlantic adding additional sites, and, moreover, visited Alberta and Alaska.
- 2023 expedition revisited New England and Midwest and added Manitoba and further reaches of Ontario and Quebec.

Destination Lithuanian America is a non-profit project. It has been partly funded by the government of Lithuania as part of the centenary of the Republic of Lithuania celebrations. The remainder of the funding was covered by Lithuanian-American organizations, Lithuanian-Americans and other Lithuanians through means such as crowd-funding.

Destination Lithuanian America map is bilingual (Lithuanian and English languages)

Destination Lithuanian America volunteers also record interviews with the Lithuanian-heritage keepers in America that have been then shown as Lithuanian-language series by the LRT television.

Together with the map, a sister project "Global True Lithuania", which is an encyclopedia of Lithuanian heritage online, is expanded with new articles. In contrast to the Destination Lithuanian America map, the encyclopedia covers Lithuanian heritage worldwide.

Both projects have been created and are led by Augustinas Žemaitis.
