= St. Henry's Church (Bayonne, New Jersey) =

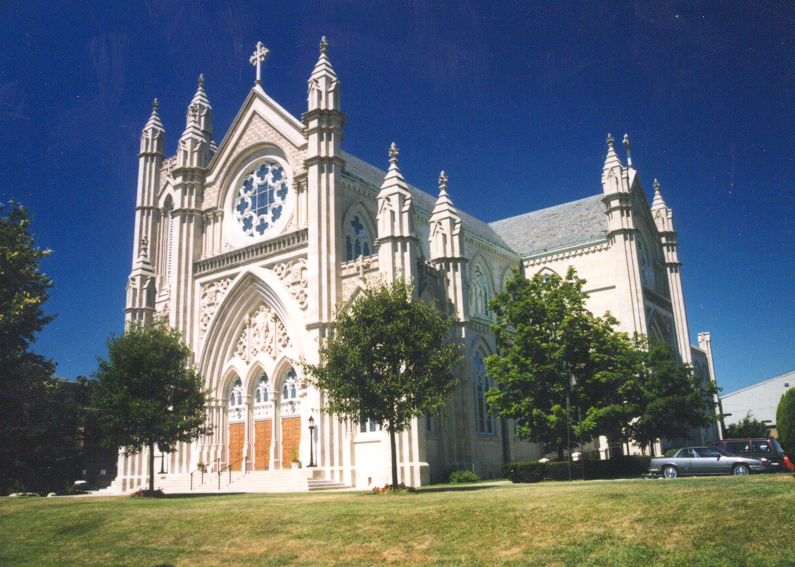
- St. Henry's Church
- St. Henry's Church
- 40.669816°N 74.116580°W
- Location: Bayonne, New Jersey
- Country: United States
- Denomination: Roman Catholic
- Website: St. Henry' Church website

History
- Founded: 1889

Architecture
- Completed: 1890

Specifications
- Materials: Limestone

Administration
- Archdiocese: Newark

St. Henry's Church is a Roman Catholic church on Avenue C between 28th.and 29th. Street in Bayonne, New Jersey. The parish was founded in 1889 by 50 German immigrant families from Bavaria and was named after Emperor Henry II of the Holy Roman Empire. It is one of the first Catholic parishes in Bayonne and is part of the Archdiocese of Newark.

== Description ==
The first building of the church, a wooden structure, was built in 1890 on the northeast corner of Avenue D (now Broadway) and 26th Street (site of the current Bayonne Post Office). The first pastor was the Reverend Alois Heller.

St. Henry's merged with St. Thomas' Church when St. Thomas's Church closed in 1892. This caused a controversy in Bayonne over what language should be spoken at masses to the congregation. It was decided by Bishop Wigger in favor of the German-Catholics.

Construction of the current English Gothic style church, designed by architect Thomas Henry Poole, began in 1911, and was patterned after Durham Cathedral in England. The design of the church is cruciform or cross-shaped similar to most medieval churches of Europe. The building exterior is made of limestone from Bedford, Indiana. The ground was broken for the new church by Fr. Peter E. Reilly on June 17, 1911, and the cornerstone was laid by Bishop O'Connor on September 15, 1912. The new church was dedicated on May 30, 1915.

After the death of Fr. Reilly in 1919, Fr. Michael Mulligan took over the parish. He bought a pulpit of carrara marble for $4,000. Later, he bought an old school building from Bayonne and opened the St. Henry's Grammar School (since closed). Monsignor Mulligan (he had been elevated to the Monsignorate in 1954) retired in 1966 and died the following year (1967). Fr. Charles J. Covert took over the parish and immediately modernized the facility at a cost of $550,000 with an additional $150,000 for the school. Fr. Covert died in 1979.

The interior of St. Henry's includes a Botticino marble main altar which was imported from Pietrasanta, Italy, a pulpit of carrara marble and the 28 foot high baldachino made of oak from the Balkans, lindenwood from Bavaria and local pine which, along with the screen behind the altar, were made in Urtijëi, Italy. Over 30,000 pieces of goldleaf were used in the gilding.

During the church renovations done from 1968 to 1969, the plain windows were replaced with stained glass windows, done in 11th century Byzantine style, including one of Pope John XXIII. These were created by Simon Berasaluce, who has been called "a modern master with a medieval touch". The current pastor of St. Henry's Church is Rev. Raul Gaviola.

== Resources ==
- Ciccarino, Rev. Christopher (2003). Seeds of Faith, Branches of Hope - The Archdiocese of Newark, New Jersey. Strasbourg, France: Editions du Signe. ISBN 2-7468-1137-5.
- Bayonne Historical Society, Inc. (1998). P. Gerard Nowicki (ed.). Bayonne Landmarks. Bayonne, New Jersey: David Lipyanka, The Creative Edge.
