= Holy Name of Jesus Roman Catholic Church (Manhattan) =

Coordinates: 40°47′40″N 73°58′14.1″W

Church of the Holy Name of Jesus and St. Gregory the Great
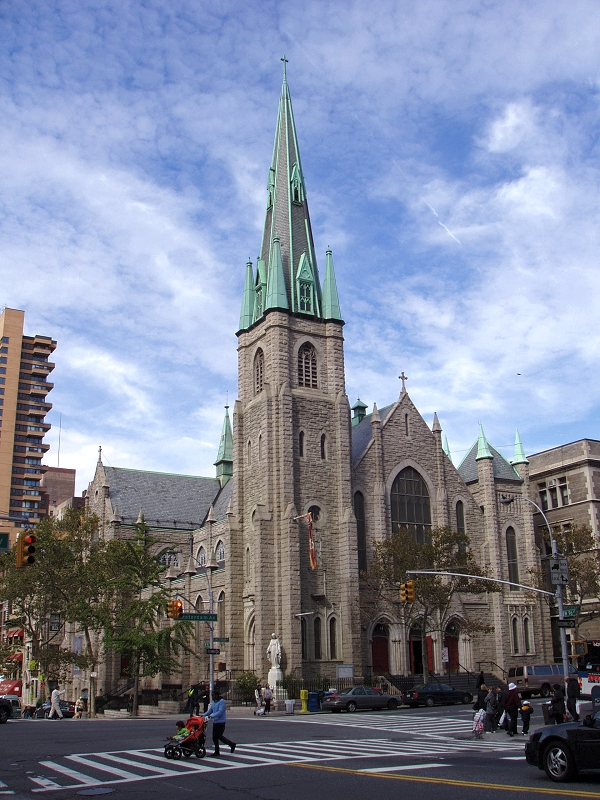
- Amsterdam Avenue and 96th Street
- Interactive map of the Church of the Holy Name of Jesus and St. Gregory the Great area

General information
- Location: 207 West 96th Street, New York City, United States of America
- Client: Roman Catholic Archdiocese of New York

Website
- Church of the Holy Name of Jesus, Manhattan (Upper West Side)

The Holy Name of Jesus Roman Catholic Church is a parish church of the Roman Catholic Archdiocese of New York located at 207 West 96th Street at the corner of Amsterdam Avenue on the Upper West Side of Manhattan, New York City. It was built in 1900 and was designed by Thomas H. Poole in the Gothic Revival style.

The parish was under the administration of the Franciscans for 30 years, between 1990 and 2020. The parish has an attached elementary and middle school, as well as a community center on West 97th Street.

On May 8, 2015, the parish was merged with that of St. Gregory the Great. The Church of St. Gregory the Great was deconsecrated and closed on June 30, 2017.

== History ==
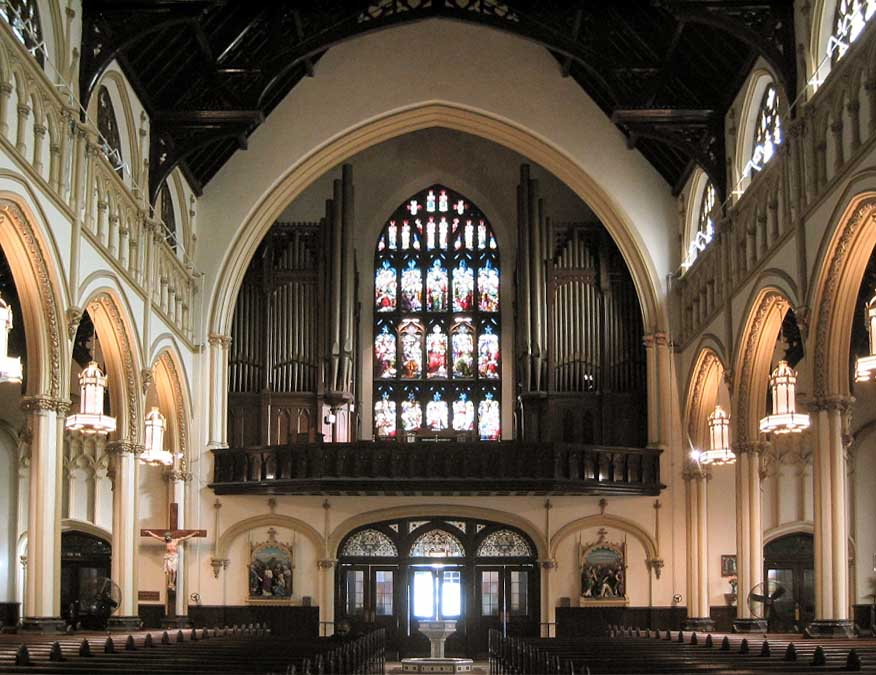
Interior of the church

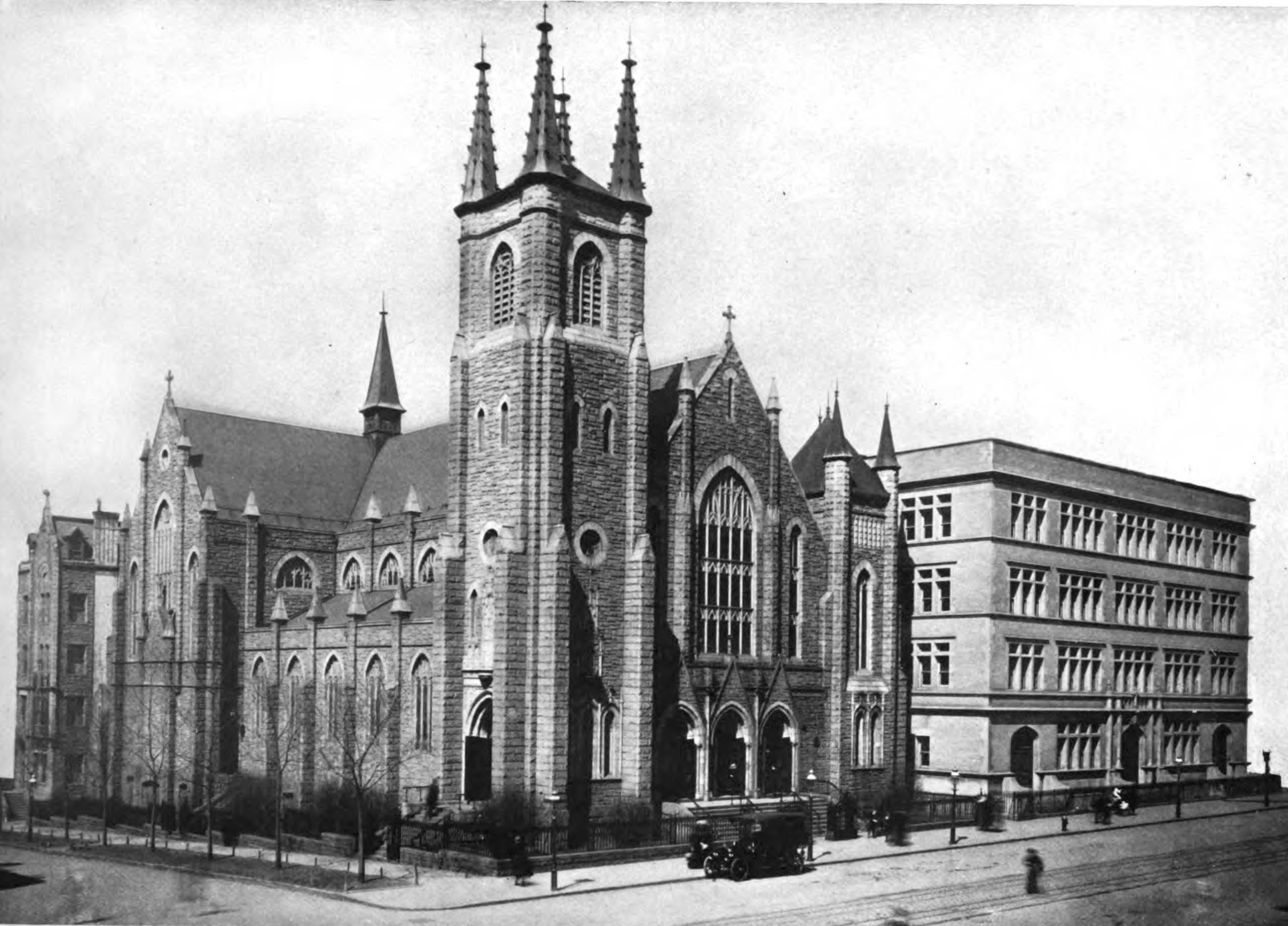
The church and school around 1914.

The Church of the Holy Name of Jesus was organized in 1868 in the area then known as Bloomingdale. A wood-frame church was erected on the northwest corner of Bloomingdale Road (now called Broadway) and 97th Street. The church was thirty-five by eighty feet, with a capacity of 500; it cost about $3,000 to build. The building was supervised by Father Richard Brennan. The new church was dedicated by Archbishop John McCloskey on September 20, 1868, and was legally incorporated in 1886.

For many years the pastor was Most Reverend Stephen Donahue, auxiliary bishop of New York. In 1939, after the death of Cardinal Patrick Hayes he was considered a possible successor as archbishop of New York. However, Pope Pius XII appointed Bishop Francis Spellman, auxiliary bishop of Boston, to the See. Bishop Donahue died in 1982.

In 1997, the church suffered damage when the air compressor in the organ caught fire during a noon mass. The church took the opportunity to initiate renovations, which were finished in 2000.

== Architecture ==
Thomas Henry Poole designed the present Gothic Revival church, which was built in stages from 1891 to 1900. The basement was finished in early 1892, and the new church was blessed and dedicated by Archbishop Michael A. Corrigan on March 20 of that year. The cornerstone for the main structure was laid on April 17, 1898, which was celebrated with a parade, and the completed church was blessed and dedicated by Archbishop Corrigan on April 1, 1900. The steeple was added in 1918.

The church's large interior is noted for its hammer-and-beam ceiling, stained glass windows, terrazzo floor, and marble altars. It is built entirely of pink Milford granite, carved at the entrances and towers. The roof construction and ceiling are made of highly polished wood. The woodwork throughout the interior is fashioned from American quartered oak. The many columns supporting the roof have been designed in very light color to provide contrast with the darker ceiling.

=== Sanctuary and altars ===
The church boasts five marble altars. The high altar, at the center of the sanctuary, is in the decorative style of Gothic architecture. It features detailed carvings and columns of onyx. A featured carving is a relief image of the Last Supper, modeled after Da Vinci's work of the same name. This carving was later moved to constitute the front of a new main altar, placed at the foot of the steps of the high altar.

Two side altars also adorn the sanctuary – a Marian altar to the high altar's left, and one dedicated to Joseph on its right. Both side altars are made from the same marble, and were placed within the sanctuary on the day the church was dedicated.

There are two additional altars, outside the communion rail, honoring the Sacred Heart of Jesus and St. Anne.

=== Stained glass ===
The large window over the main entrance of the church represents the Adoration of the Holy Name of Jesus. The south transept's window represents the Presentation of the Virgin Mary in the Temple, while the window in the north transept depicts the apparition of the Sacred Heart to Saint Margaret Mary Alacoque. The window nearest the altar of the Virgin Mary is dedicated to the Immaculate Conception, while the window near the altar of Saint Joseph depicts his death.

On the north and south sides of the church, the windows describe events in the life of Jesus Christ. On the south side are the annunciation, Christ's birth, the presentation in the Temple, Christ among the Pharisees, and Christ as a carpenter. On the north side are Christ's baptism, Christ blessing the children, anointing at Bethany, the agony in the garden, and Christ's handing of the keys to Saint Peter.

=== Organ ===
M.P. Moller Pipe Organ Company's Opus 6570 was installed in the church in 1937. The instrument contains four-manuals with 68 stops and 76 ranks. As a result of the 1997 fire, the organ suffered smoke and water damage and portions are not operable.

== School ==
Money to build a school began to be collected early in 1902. The cornerstone was laid on October 16, 1904, and the building was completed in 1905. Located on the southwest corner of Amsterdam Avenue and 97th Street, it was blessed and dedicated on September 10, 1905, by Archbishop John Murphy Farley. The cost of building was $200,000. The Sisters of Charity were enlisted to serve as the school's faculty.

== Community roles ==
Holy Name has taken a leading role in addressing social justice issues on Manhattan's Upper West Side.

The church sponsored numerous petitions and took a leading role in closing a zoning loophole that a land developer had exploited in order to build two large condominium towers.

Holy Name also organizes an interfaith March for Peace every year on Martin Luther King Jr Day, along with several Lutheran and Episcopal Churches and several synagogues and is the epicenter of the organization West Siders for Peace.
