= Saint Kateri Tekakwitha Church (LaGrangeville, New York) =

Coordinates: 41.64569°N 73.75998°W

- Saint Kateri Tekakwitha Church
- Location: Lagrangeville, New York
- Denomination: Roman Catholic

History
- Founded: 2002

Architecture
- Architect(s): Donald L. Swartz, Swartz Architecture, DPC

Administration
- Archdiocese: Archdiocese of New York

Saint Kateri Tekakwitha Church (LaGrangeville, New York) is a Roman Catholic parish church located in Lagrangeville, Dutchess County, under the authority of the Roman Catholic Archdiocese of New York. It was established as a mission of St. Columba in Hopewell Junction in 1998 before being elevated to parish status in 2002. The church was built 2006–2008. It was "that would be a standard and model for future churches built in the Archdiocese of New York." The church was built between 2006 and 2008. Cardinal Egan among others dedicated the church on Sunday, November 23, 2008.

Donald Swartz was chosen as the architect of the new churches after several design proposals were considered in 2002. The engineering firm was The DiSalvo Engineering Group.

The main altar contains a relic of Saint Kateri Tekakwitha. The church contains significant items from two important New York City churches that had been recently closed. The tabernacle is from Our Lady of Vilnius in Manhattan, and the stained-glass windows by the prominent Bavarian firm of Mayers of Munich (stained glass makers to the Holy See) were transferred from the Harlem Church of St. Thomas the Apostle in Harlem, New York, (1907) installed in 2007. Both closed churches faced lengthy preservation debates to forestall their demolition and architectural details dispersal. Rohlf's Stained Glass Studios of Mt. Vernon, New York completely restored the 100 year old Mayer windows. The Rose Window is also by Rohlf.

Rocks containing the names of the parishioners in 2007 were placed under the altar stone. The Rosary Garden was an Eagle Scout project by Spencer Coffin and many parishioners. The mission cross built by John McFadden. The former church was transformed into a Faith Formation Center in 2008 and a Parish Office wing was added along with the construction of a new Priest's Residence.
