= Saint Cecilia's Catholic Church (Brooklyn) =

Saint Cecilia's
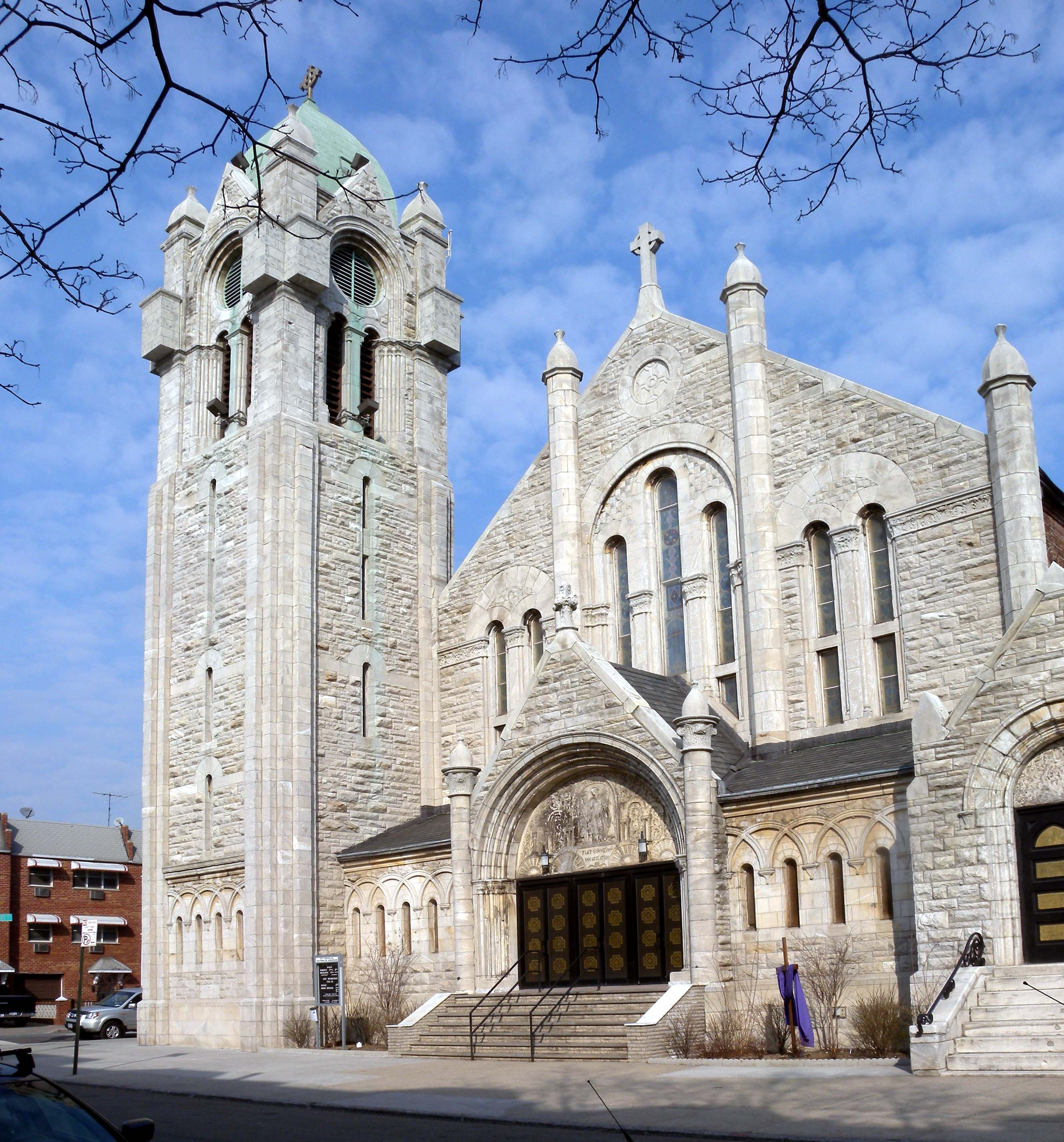
- Saint Cecilia's Catholic Church in Brooklyn

- Location within New York City
- 40°43′13.25″N 73°56′30.48″W
- Location: Brooklyn
- Country: United States
- Denomination: Catholic
- Website: Official site

History
- Consecrated: 1901

Architecture
- Architect: Thomas Henry Poole
- Completed: 1891

Specifications
- Capacity: 800

Administration
- Diocese: Brooklyn

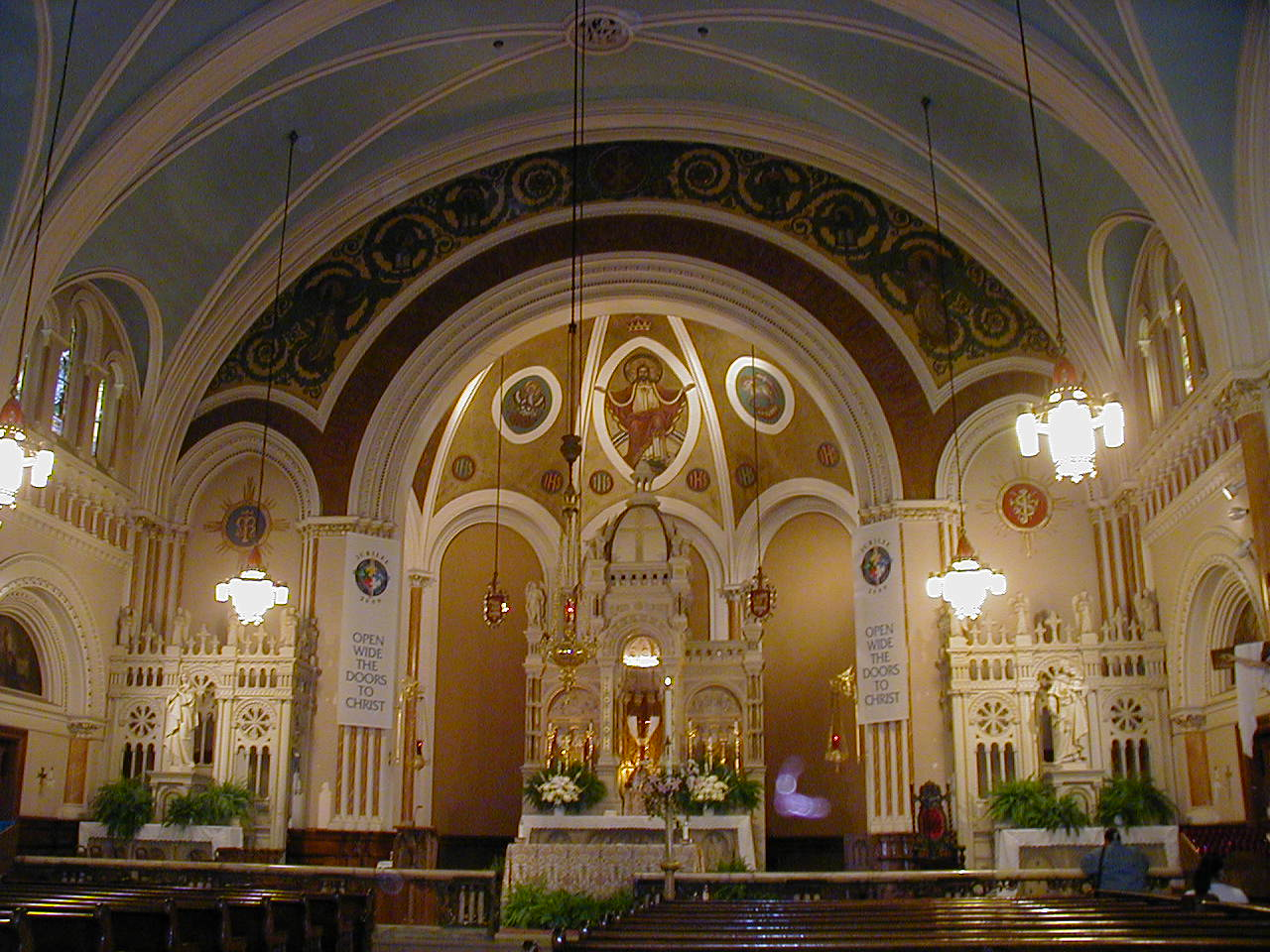
Saint Cecilia's Catholic Church interior

Saint Cecilia's is a Catholic parish church in the Diocese of Brooklyn located at North Henry and Herbert streets, Greenpoint, Brooklyn, New York. It is named for Saint Cecilia, the patron saint of music. It is a contributing building in the Greenpoint Historic District, listed on the National Register of Historic Places in 1983.

== The Church ==
The former church was built in 1871. Later the former structure was placed beside the new church and converted to a lyceum/gymnasium. The current church was constructed in 1891 based on plans supplied by architect Thomas Henry Poole and was solemnly consecrated 1901. The outer stone used for the construction is limestone, said to be originally utilized by St. Patrick's Cathedral of Manhattan. It is most notable for its illuminated bell tower with copper roof, which can be seen from the northbound side of the nearby Brooklyn–Queens Expressway.

The church seats over 800 people.

The church property consists of a school, the church, a chapel, the rectory, a convent, a brothers' house, a gymnasium and priest housing. The school celebrated its centennial in 2006. Saint Cecilia's chapel was formerly a baptismal area, but due to the Vatican's reformed rules to bring baptisms closer to the church community, the baptismal font was moved to within the church.

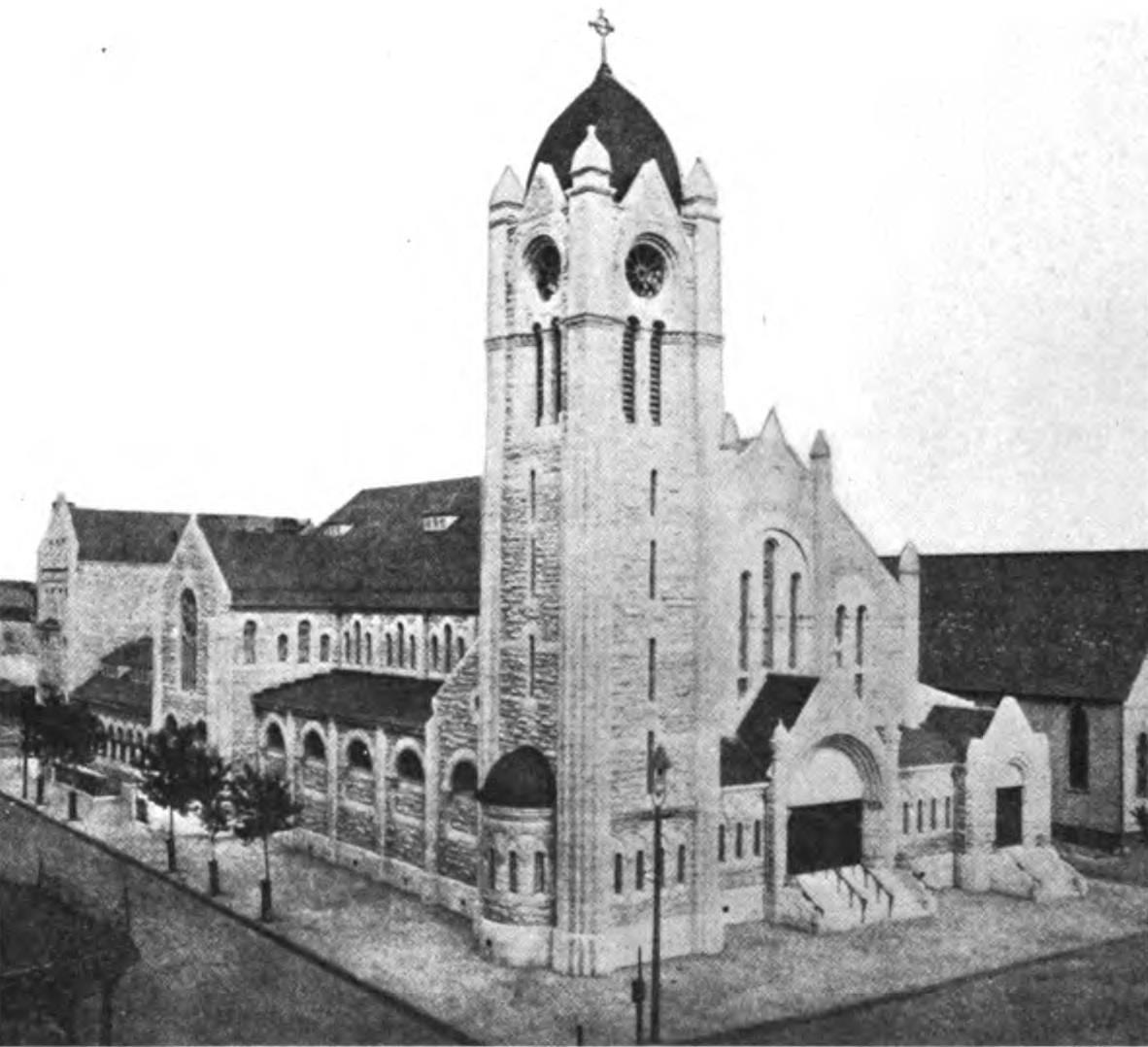
An image of the church from a 1914 publication

== Notable services ==
On June 26, 2007, the funeral service for deceased firefighter Daniel Pujdak were conducted at the church. Thousands of people, mostly firemen, attended. Notables included New York City Mayor Michael Bloomberg, Fire Commissioner Nicholas Scoppetta, and City Council Speaker Christine Quinn. The funeral service was covered extensively by the press.

== Pastors ==
Notable pastors were Monsignors Edward J.McGolrick, Joseph J. Reagan, Parks, and O'Toole.

== Restoration ==
Saint Cecilia's underwent a restoration project during the 1970s. The church was restored to its former paint scheme. The project was directed by Msgr. Joseph Parks. The artists who worked on the church came from Italy. The church has a painting of Saint Cecilia. On the walls of the nave are to be found the Fourteen Stations of the Cross sculpted in marble. The stained-glass windows within the church have a rendition of Saint Cecilia playing the organ and other religious scenes.

== Saint Cecilia's School ==
Saint Cecilia's School opened in 1906 under the guidance of Monsignor McGoldrick. The school was among the largest parochial schools in the United States during the 1930s and 1940s.

From the 1970s until 2006, the school was led by Sister Miriam, S.J. By the early 2000s, the school fell on hard times like many other Roman Catholic elementary schools in the NYC area. With only 107 students registered for the September 2009 session, combined with a six figure debt, Rev. James Krische was compelled to close the school.

In 2013, a developer signed a 49-year lease to convert the old school building to residential apartments.
