= Our Lady of Vilnius Church =

Former church in Manhattan, New York

Coordinates: 40°43′28.4″N 74°0′23.6″W

Our Lady of Vilnius Roman Catholic Church
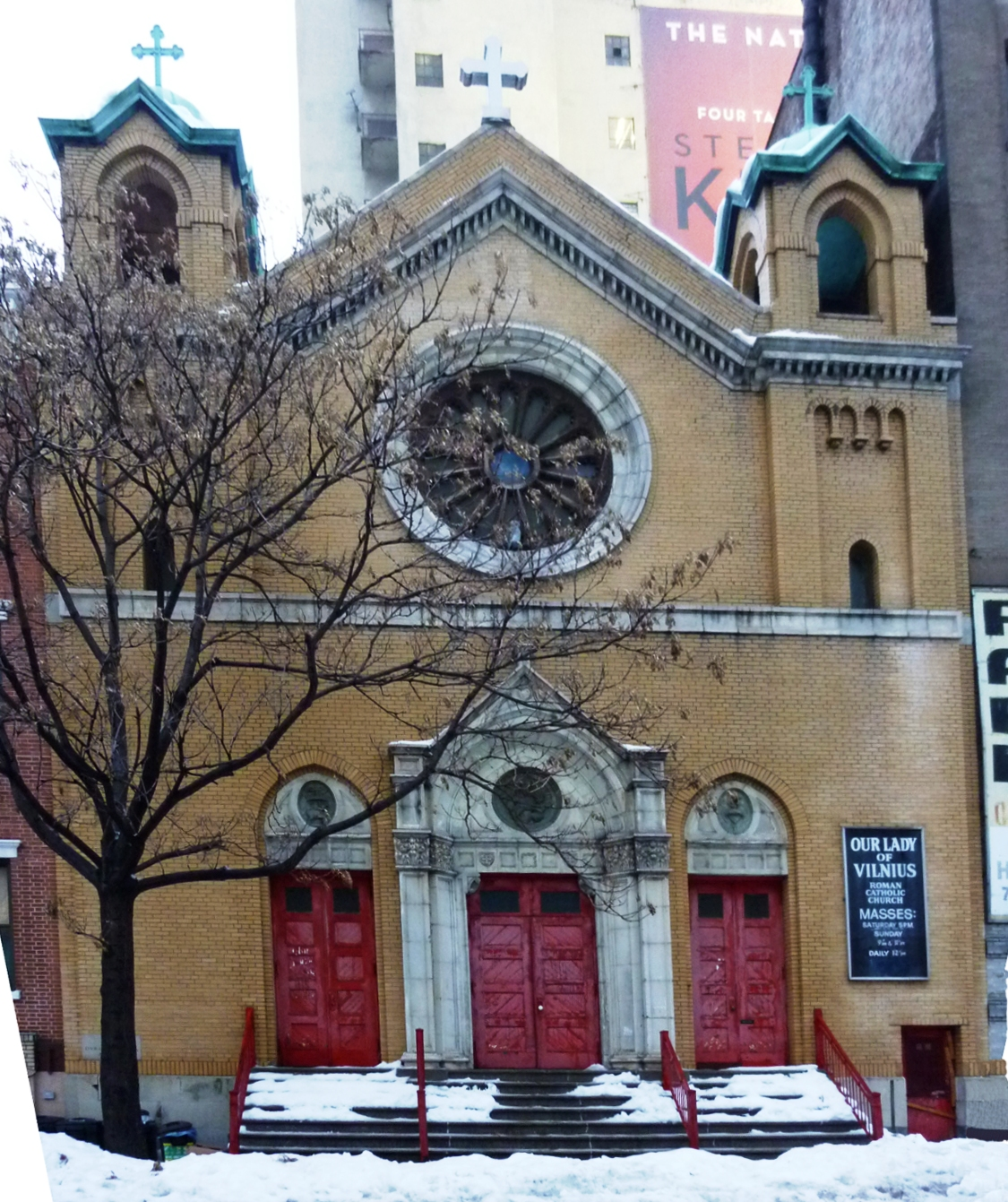
- The church in 2011
- Interactive map of the Our Lady of Vilnius Roman Catholic Church area

General information
- Architectural style: Lombardo-Gothic with Gothic Revival and Romanesque Revival details
- Location: Manhattan, New York City
- Construction started: 1910 (for church)
- Completed: 1910 (for church)
- Demolished: May 2015
- Cost: $25,000 (1910)
- Client: The Roman Catholic Archdiocese of New York

Technical details
- Structural system: Yellow brick masonry with terra-cotta ornaments

Design and construction
- Architects: Harry G. Wiseman 104 W. 42 St, NY, NY (for church)

Our Lady of Vilnius Church was a Roman Catholic parish church located at 568–570 Broome Street, in Hudson Square, Manhattan, New York City, east of the entrance to the Holland Tunnel but predating it. It was built in 1910 as the national parish church of the Lithuanian Catholic community. The church's name referred to Vilnius, the capital of Lithuania. Despite a landmarks preservation debate, the church was demolished in May 2015.

== History ==
The parish was established in 1909 "as a national parish church to serve Lithuanian Catholics in New York City."

"Located on Broome Street near Varick, the parish became a center fostering not only religious belief but also Lithuanian culture and national identity. People rallied around their church to maintain community bonds and remain close to their homeland. Our Lady of Vilnius was for many years home for a local chapter of the Knights of Columbus, a Catholic fraternal order."

The church was built by Lithuanians fleeing mandatory service in the Imperial Russian Army before World War I who settled in the Lower West Side area and worked as longshoremen on the Hudson River docks. Construction of the Holland Tunnel uprooted the community, many resettling in the Bronx and the suburbs." "In the 1920s, construction of the nearby Hudson Tunnel and its access roads uprooted the community, and by the time the tunnel opened in November, 1927, many one-family homes belonging to Lithuanian parishioners had been destroyed." "Over the years, however, the Lithuanians continued to return to the church for social activities and for Masses in Latin with songs and homilies in their native language." Noted one observer, "It's heritage that's more important than religion," he said. "It was like a Lithuanian club."

== Building ==
The yellow brick Lombard-Gothic church with Gothic Revival and Gothic Revival details was built for $25,000 in 1910 to designs by theatre architect Harry G. Wiseman of 104 West 42nd Street; the rector during construction was listed as Rev. Joseph L. Shestokas of 7 Vandam Street. Wiseman was listed that year as the architect of two venues for Penn Amusements, including a modest brick theatre at 223 West 42nd Street, and an "open-air moving picture show" on the southeast corner of 111th Street and Eighth Avenue.

== Description and condition ==
The structure is an attached midblock yellow brick double-height Lombardo-Gothic church with Gothic Revival and Romanesque Revival details designed by Harry G. Wiseman. It was completed in 1910. The only exposed elevation, the Broome Street gable facade is symmetrical divided into an upper and lower section by a moulded limestone platband. The lower facade has a limestone water table/plint moulded with three centrally placed square-headed entrances with raised-and-fielded painted timber five-panel double-leaf doors (top panels glazed), all with pointed-arched limestone tympanums above consisting of a moulded lintel and blank tympanum with inset moulded terracotta panel (that to center is round, those to sides are almond shaped). Central entrance has detailed limestone gabled surround with single-rebated ornamented pilasters. To right, simple square-headed entrance interrupts plinth with descending steps accessing basement, notice board affixed above. Datestone above plinth to left corner inscribed "CHURCH / OF / OUR LADY OF VILNA / MDCCCX". Upper facade is divided into three sections with a continuous dentilled cornice rising with the central wide gable section that contains the circular stained-glass rose window with limestone moulded surround, flanked to both sides by the pilaster bases of two narrow towers with round-headed slit window above platband. Towers rise into copper domed upper belfry stages with rebated pointed arch-headed apertures to all sides. Copper-clad crosses surmount both towers and gable apex.

The church was still standing in February 2011 but the iron clamps holding the limestone plinth had rusted in several sections and burst the masonry. The date stone appeared to have been crudely re-worked with cement applied to certain letters. A statue of an owl was precariously balanced at the base of the rose window, blocking one light.

== Closure and preservation debate ==
The church was closed on February 27, 2007, one of several that year, by Cardinal Edward Egan of the Roman Catholic Archdiocese of New York, citing "a damaged roof support beam and a dwindling congregation." The roof had been unstable since the late 1990s and services had been held in the basement. The doors were locked in 2007 and the Archdiocese filed plans to demolish the structure. The church records were moved to nearby St. Anthony of Padua Church at 155 Sullivan Street.

Lithuanian president, Valdas Adamkus, petitioned Pope Benedict XVI in person in April 2007 to save the parish. The tabernacle was transferred to the Church of the Blessed Kateri Tekakwitha, which was dedicated in 2008.

"On December 23, 2008, the archdiocese's demolition company, A. Russo Wrecking, sent letters to landowners stating that demolition was to take place "in the near future." But then the Appellate Division of State Supreme Court issued a stay, indicating it would hear the appeal of Justice York's decision.

Similar to other closed Roman Catholic churches in New York City, like Harlem's Church of St. Thomas the Apostle (New York City), a lawsuit to block the church's demolition was filed by former congregants and supporters resulting in a court-issued restraining order, in effective April 2009, [which] ensured that Our Lady of Vilnius, though unused, was still standing.

Protesters during the March 2010 blizzard carried "Lithuanian flags—yellow, green and red—along with American flags. On the church's red doors they tacked up signs: "God Never Closes His Doors," "Save Our Heritage," and "Stalin 1939 – Egan 2007."

The building was demolished in May 2015 and an apartment block now stands on the site.

== In popular culture ==
Exterior and interior views of the church in the 1970s are seen in several scenes of the 2000 film documentary As I Was Moving Ahead Occasionally I Saw Brief Glimpses of Beauty.

The church and the entrance to Holland Tunnel is depicted on the cover of the Yo La Tengo album I Can Hear the Heart Beating as One.
