= St. Thomas the Apostle Church (Manhattan) =

Church in Manhattan, New York

The Former Church of St. Thomas the Apostle
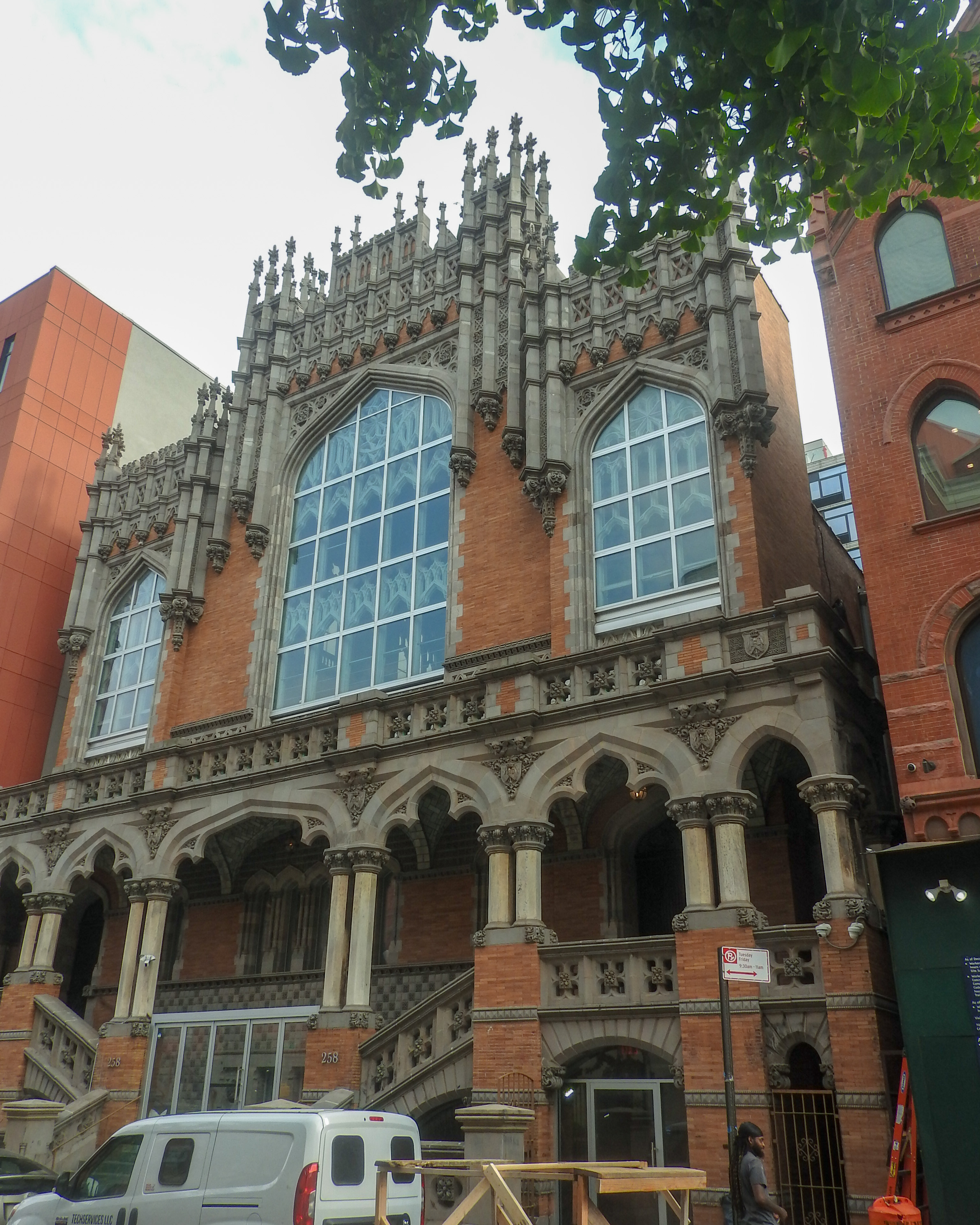
- 2021

General information
- Architectural style: Gothic Revival
- Location: New York City
- Coordinates: 40°48′18″N 73°57′11.6″W
- Completed: 1907
- Client: The Roman Catholic Archdiocese of New York

Technical details
- Structural system: Masonry

Design and construction
- Architect: Thomas H. Poole

Church of St. Thomas the Apostle is a former Roman Catholic parish church in New York City. It was the subject of a landmarks preservation debate. The parish was established in 1889; staffed by the Salesians of Don Bosco from 1979 to 2003; and closed in 2003 because of a diminished congregation and structural problems.

In 2013 the premises at 118th Street amd St. Nicholas Avenue, in Harlem, Manhattan was sold to a private developer. After extensive renovation, the church building is used as a concert venue.

== History ==
The parish was established in 1889 for Irish immigrants. It was founded from St. Joseph of the Holy Family in Manhattanville. The first pastor was John J. Keogan, formerly of County Cavan, Ireland. Later German immigrants replaced the Irish. Later the congregation became primarily African American.

In 1897, Keogan purchased St. Michaels's Episcopal Church and used it for services until St. Thomas was completed; after which he turned it into the parish school for 900 students, staffed by the Sisters of Mercy. On April 13, 1913, a fire destroyed the school and damaged the church. classes were resumed in the lower church, until a new school was built. The parish instituted a "Penny Fund" whereby parishioners contributed a penny a day to retire the debt.

The church had many notable connections, including Harry Belafonte's family, who worshipped there; Kareem Abdul-Jabbar was said to have been baptized in this church; Hulan E. Jack, the first black borough president of Manhattan, was buried from here." Eddie Bonnemère also served as the music director.

Lacking funds, clergy, and students for its attached parish school, the Catholic Order of Salesians of Don Bosco assumed control over the church and school in 1979, and are largely assumed to have rescued the church, closing the school and reusing it as a community center/computer skills training facility for young women. The training center remained open after the church's closure.

== Architecture ==
The present church was built 1907 to designs by Thomas H. Poole & Company, and dedicated the same year. The interior was noted for its remarkable fan vaulting and celebrated German stained glass (from the still operating studio of Mayer of Munich, famed stained glass makers for the Holy See and Catholic churches around the world). The AIA Guide to NYC describes the church as follows: “No name is to be found on this church, but its finely detailed neo-Gothic façade, prominently entered via a stairway and an arcaded porch, demands attention.” The building is a blend of English Perpendicular Gothic, Moorish and Venetian Gothic, in what is described as “berserk eclecticism”, “unnameable but wonderful.” The interior had intricately carved woodwork; the altar was of white marble.

== Closure and preservation campaigns ==
Many established churches in the neighborhood have lost their congregations to storefront churches. In 2002, the church which was designed to seat 800 only attracted around 250 parishioners for Sunday Mass. At the same time, substantial facade repairs proved financially crippling. “The front of the church is covered with posters that read: ‘Don't be fooled by the present scaffolding! We are open. We are alive. We are growing.’ The posters call St. Thomas ‘the Catholic Church in Harlem with room for you!’” In addition, there were dubious cracks in the main internal columns. The building was condemned in 2003 and the Salesians pulled out. Landmark protection has been debated, as the church is considered one of the finest in Harlem. Heather McCracken of the Landmarks Preservation Commission said that the church was found to be "in a deteriorated condition that made it ineligible for landmark designation."

The Archdiocese of New York has attempted to demolish the structure since the closure with the offer to replace the structure with affordable housing for the elderly.

Similar to other similar Catholic churches in the city with stays of demolition, such as Manhattan's Our Lady of Vilnius Church, a number of strategies have been invoked to save St. Thomas. Lawsuits, widespread community and city protests, and concerned letters arriving from as far away as Germany have delayed demolition, although the city has been unwilling to bestow landmark protection. A letter writing campaign attracted a great deal of attention. The son of the German stained glass maker even wrote in support of keeping the stained glass with the original church. However, the stained glass was removed to the new Church of Blessed Kateri Tekakwitha in the upstate New York town of Lagrangeville.

== Redevelopment ==
In 2013, a developer, Artimus, bought the former church and rectory, and proposed partial demolition, a theater, and a housing condominium. Artemis promised to preserve the church's façade and interior. Since then, The front, rear walls and ceiling have been restored.. Additional restoration is continuing. Artimus is also converting the church's school to affordable housing. Plans also include a community space to house an arts group. Ann Friedman of the New York Landmarks Conservancy said that it was felt that "community re-use of at least some of the church was better than seeing it demolished." In May 2016 Diamanda Galás performed a piano program at the renovated former church. The adjacent 1907 rectory was renovated into an artist's home and studio, featured in The New York Times Style Magazine in 2023.
