= Our Lady of Good Counsel Church (Manhattan) =

Catholic parish church in New York City

Coordinates: 40°46′50.29″N 73°57′3.37″W

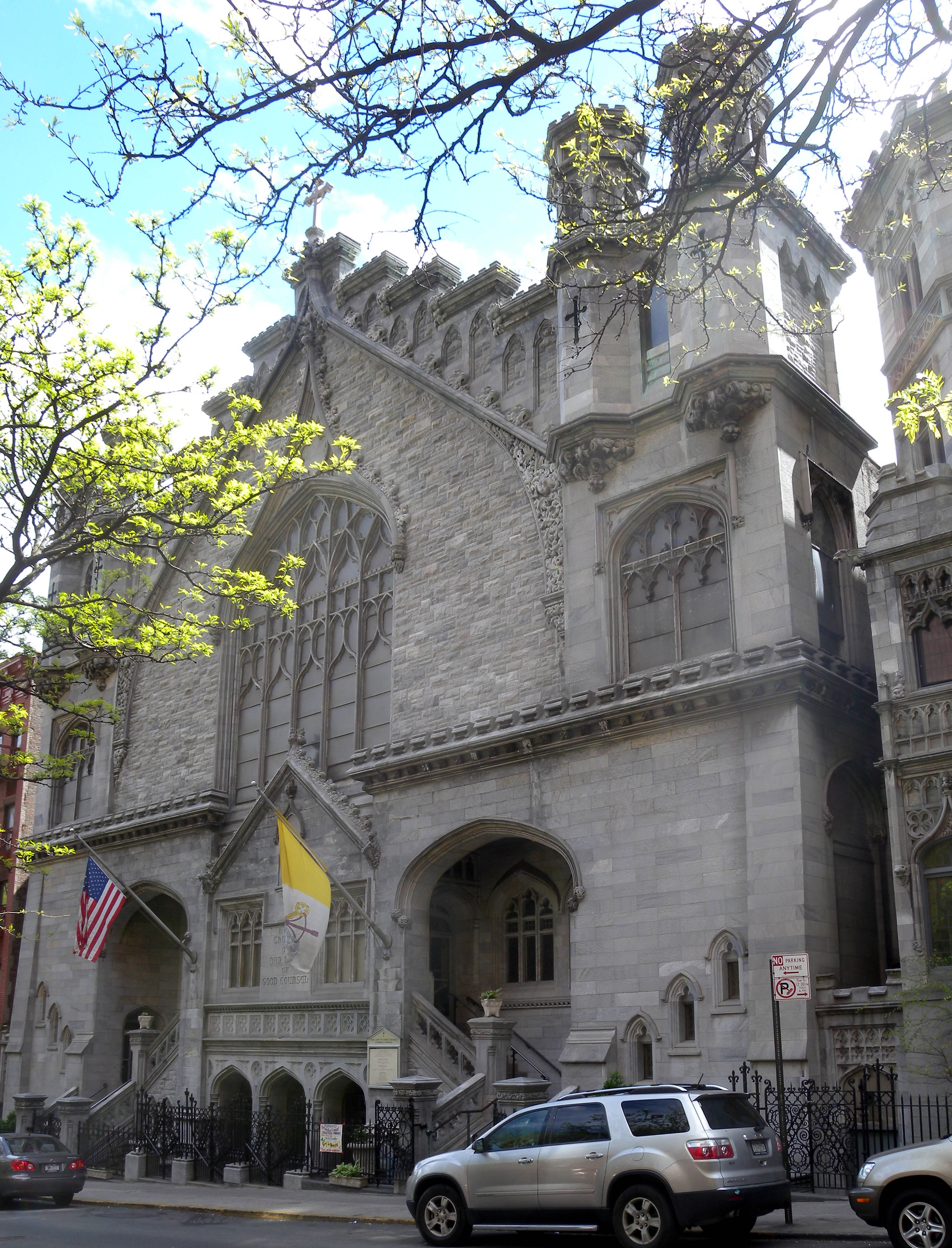
- Photographed in 2010; Looking south at Our Lady of Good Counsel RC Church on a sunny day.
- Interactive map of Our Lady of Good Counsel Church

General information
- Location: New York, New York, United States of America
- Completed: 1892
- Client: Roman Catholic Archdiocese of New York

Design and construction
- Architect: Thomas H. Poole

Website
- Our Lady of Good Counsel, New York

The Church of Our Lady of Good Counsel is a parish church in the Roman Catholic Archdiocese of New York, located at 230 East 90th Street, Manhattan, New York City. The parish was established in 1886. The church was completed in 1892 to the designs by Thomas H. Poole. The address listed in 1892 was 236 East 90th Street.

Harry Connick Jr. was the church pianist, as a little-known teen in 1985–1987.
