= Luigi Fugazy =

Italian American businessman and padrone

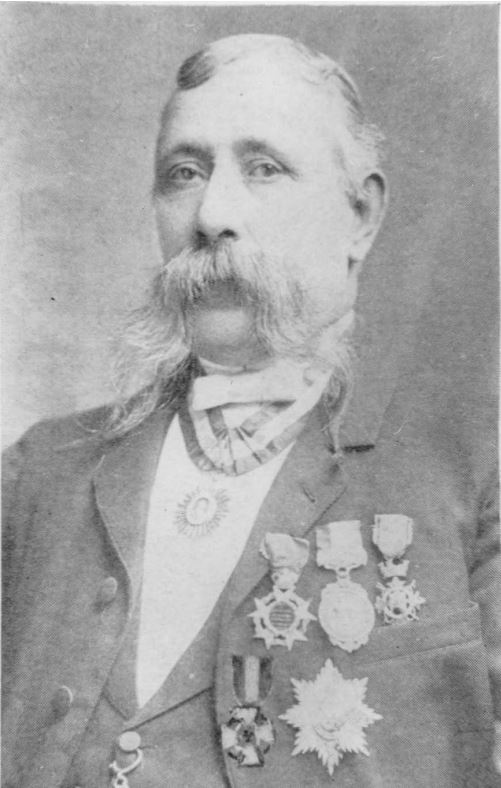
- Luigi Fugazy in 1906
- Born: Luigi V. Fugazzi; April 30, 1839; Santo Stefano d'Aveto, Liguria, Kingdom of Piedmont-Sardinia
- Died: August 6, 1930 (aged 91); Manhattan, New York City, United States
- Resting place: Calvary Cemetery
- Occupations: Banker, businessman, philanthropist
- Spouse: Maria Fugazzi
- Children: 6, including Humbert

Luigi V. Fugazzi (April 30, 1839 – August 6, 1930; anglicized as Fugazy), nicknamed Papa Fugazy, was an Italian American banker, businessman, and philanthropist who became one of the most prominent padroni in the United States. He emigrated to the United States in 1869 and established a bank and a service company for Italians in New York City's South Village. He also established and supported many Italian mutual aid societies and fraternal organizations in the city.

== Early life ==
Luigi V. Fugazzi was born to a wealthy family in Santo Stefano d'Aveto, Liguria, on April 30, 1839. His father was a teacher in Piedmont. Luigi served as an officer in the Royal Piedmontese Army, being briefly assigned to a unit commanded by Giuseppe Garibaldi, and was considered a hero of the Italian unification. In 1869, he emigrated to the United States. He married Maria Fugazzi and had six children, including the boxing promoter Humbert Fugazy.

== New York businessman ==
When Fugazy arrived in the United States, he had already learned to speak English and possessed a substantial inheritance from his father. He changed his surname from Fugazzi to Fugazy in order to assimilate into American culture. He established several businesses in New York City, first opening a bank, and acting as a notary public. Poor Italians deposited their money with him to safeguard it from thieves and con artists. He also ran a company that provided services to Italians, such as translation and letter-writing, and became a travel agent with a steamship company. His businesses provided services to thousands of Italian immigrants living in New York. Fugazy also provided legal advice to Italians to assist them with the American legal system. He conducted his businesses out of his home at 157 Bleecker Street in the South Village of Manhattan, which he purchased on September 21, 1904.

As a result of his prominence in Italian communities in New York City, Fugazy became seen as a benevolent padrone, and The New York Times reported his nickname of "Papa Fugazy". Edith M. Thomas described him as "one of the best-known Italian bankers" in New York City, and Gay Talese described him as "perhaps the most eminent padrone in the United States".

== Civic and philanthropic activities ==
Commendatore ribbon bar of the Order of the Crown of Italy

Fugazy became involved in New York City politics and was closely connected with Tammany Hall, acting as a liaison between the political machine and Italian communities.

Fugazy was a significant promoter of over 100 Italian fraternal organizations and mutual aid societies in New York, and founded several of his own, including the Societa Santo, the Societa G. P. Riva, and Lodge Mazzini. He also encouraged existing ones to join together in a citywide federation, rather than operating only in their specific neighborhoods. Fugazy also founded the Italian Hospital in Manhattan, and was one of the first trustees and a significant benefactor of Our Lady of Pompeii Church.

In 1890, the King of Italy, Umberto I, granted Fugazy the title of chevalier of the Order of the Crown of Italy. In 1910, King Victor Emmanuel III promoted him to the rank of commendatore.

== Death ==
Fugazy died at his home on Bleecker Street on August 6, 1930. A solemn requiem Mass was held on August 9 at St. Anthony of Padua Church. Thousands of people lined the sidewalks as his body was conveyed from his home to the church, and there were over 1,000 people in attendance inside the church. Among the dignitaries present were Congressman Fiorello La Guardia, judges and members of the city government, and the minister provincial of the Franciscan Province of the Immaculate Conception. Fugazy was buried in Calvary Cemetery in Queens.

At the time of his death, Fugazy's bank was valued at $275,000, equivalent to $5.3 million in 2025, and had more than 600 depositors. His family was required by law to sell the bank's charter upon his death. They retained ownership of the travel agency, which became the Fugazy Travel Bureau.
