= Italians in New York City =

New York City has the largest population of Italian Americans in the United States as well as North America, many of whom inhabit ethnic enclaves in Brooklyn, the Bronx, Manhattan, Queens, and Staten Island. New York is home to the third largest Italian population outside of Italy, behind Buenos Aires, Argentina (first) and São Paulo, Brazil (second). Over 2.6 million Italians and Italian-Americans live in the greater New York metro area, with about 800,000 living within one of the five New York City boroughs. This makes Italian Americans the largest ethnic group in the New York metro area.

Italian food store that imported olive oil and other products, Manhattan, 1943.

Fiorello La Guardia was mayor of New York City 1934–1946 as a Republican. A 1993 survey of historians, political scientists and urban experts conducted by Melvin G. Holli of the University of Illinois at Chicago saw La Guardia ranked as the best American big-city mayor to serve between the years 1820 and 1993.

The first Italian to reside in New York was Pietro Cesare Alberti, a Venetian seaman who, in 1635, settled in the Dutch colony of New Amsterdam that would eventually become New York. A small wave of Protestants, known as Waldensians, who were of French and northern Italian heritage (specifically Piedmontese), occurred during the 17th century, with the majority coming between 1654 and 1663. A 1671 Dutch record indicates that, in 1656 alone, the Duchy of Savoy near Turin, Italy, had exiled 300 Waldensians due to their Protestant faith.

The largest wave of Italian immigration to the United States took place in the late 19th century and early 20th century. Between 1820 and 1978, 5.3 million Italians immigrated to the United States, including over two million between 1900 and 1910. However, most planned a short stay to make money, and about half returned to Italy.

== Occupations ==
The Italians who arrived in large numbers from 1880 to 1914 were poor peasants with few skills. According to Samuel Baily, three in four worked in manual labor jobs, such as construction, transportation, factory work, or domestic service, during both the years 1880 and 1905. These jobs were mostly unskilled or semi-skilled. The remaining 25% consisted mainly of low-income white-collar workers like peddlers and barbers, along with shopkeepers running neighborhood grocery stores. Only 2%, held professional status, primarily musicians and music teachers.

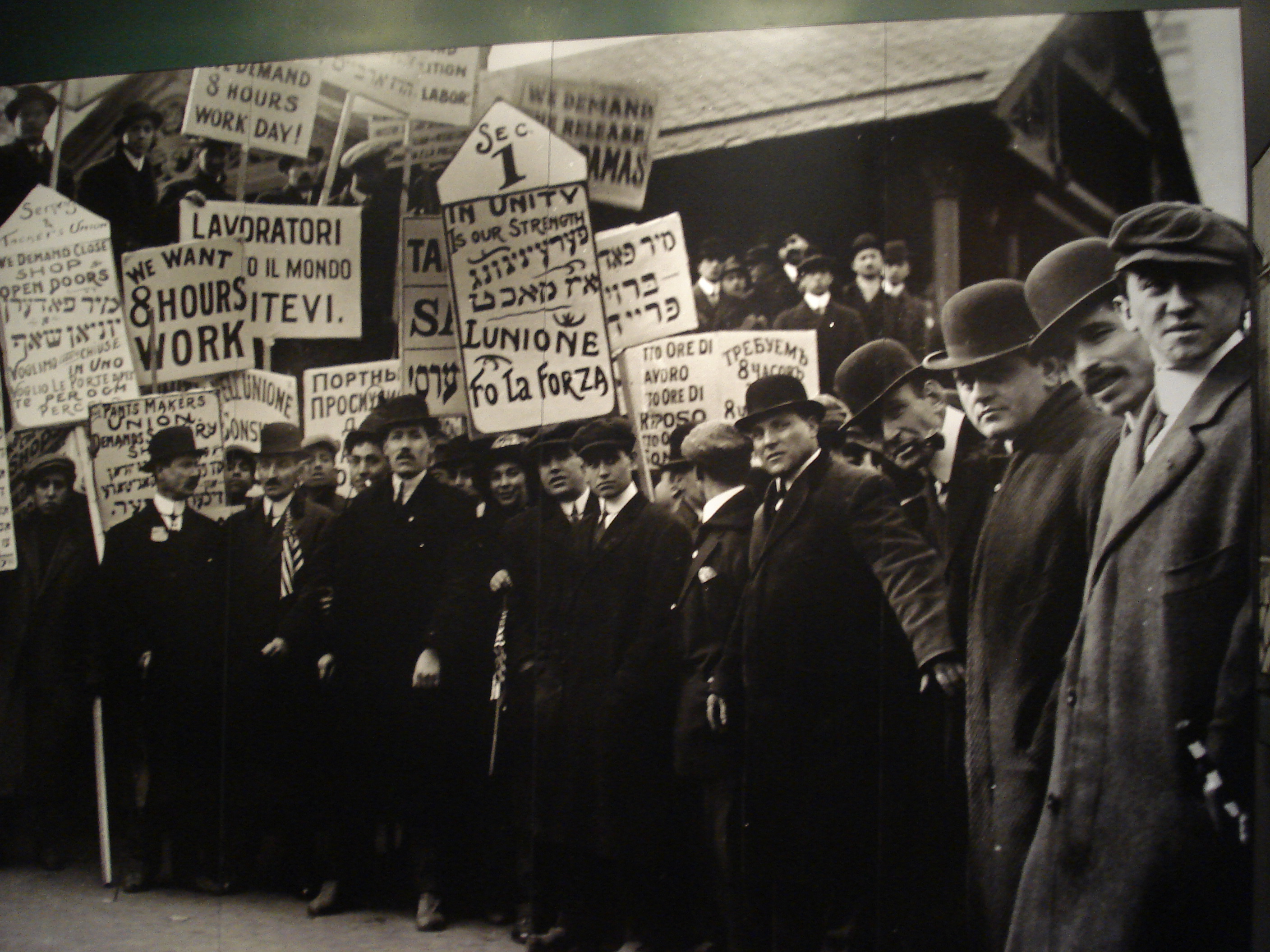
Garment workers on strike, holding banners in Italian as well as English, Yiddish and Russian, 1913.

In terms of job searching, newly arrived Italians typically signed up with a "padrone". For a fee this Italian businessman found jobs and negotiated wages. The Italians earned well below average rates. Their weekly earnings in manufacturing and mining (for the entire national economy) in 1909 came to $9.61 (equal to US$333.36 in 2024), compared to $13.63 for German immigrants and $11.06 for Poles. A goal of returning to Italy in two years with $200 thus meant saving $2 a week.

== Neighborhoods ==
The first New York neighborhood to be settled by large numbers of Italian immigrants – primarily from Southern Italy (mostly from Sicily) – was East Harlem, which became the first part of the city to be known as "Little Italy". The area, which lies east of Lexington Avenue between 96th and 116th Streets and east of Madison Avenue between 116th and 125th Streets, featured people from different regions of Italy on each cross street, as immigrants from each area chose to live in close proximity to each other.

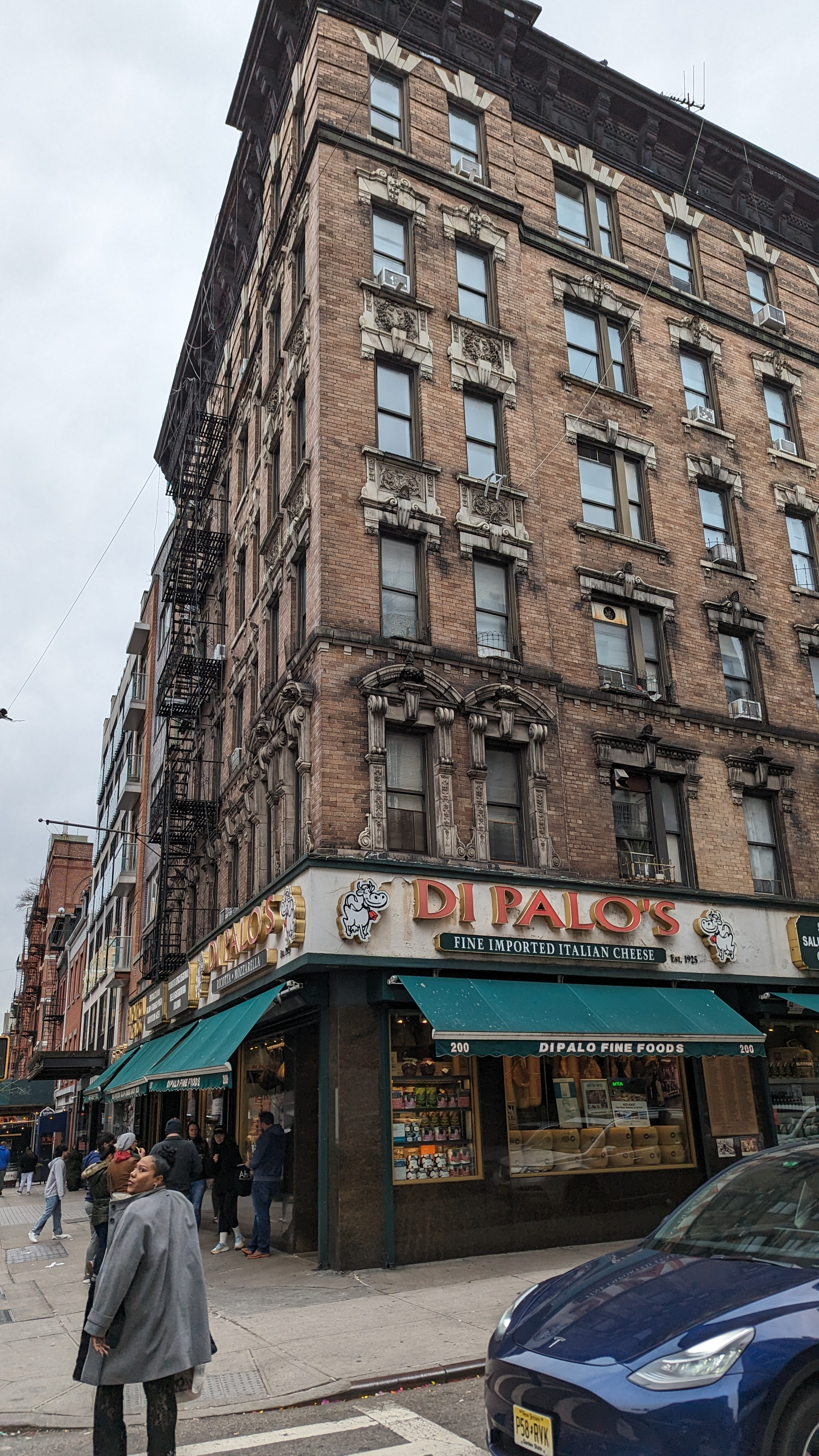
Di Palo's Fine Foods, in Little Italy since 1925.

"Italian Harlem" approached its peak in the 1930s, with over 100,000 Italian-Americans living in its crowded, run-down apartment buildings. The 1930 census showed that 81 percent of the population of Italian Harlem consisted of first- or second- generation Italian Americans. This was somewhat less than the concentration of Italian Americans in the Lower East Side’s Little Italy with 88 percent; Italian Harlem’s total population, however, was three times that of Little Italy. Remnants of the neighborhood's Italian heritage are kept alive by the Giglio Society of East Harlem. Every year on the second weekend of August, the Feast of Our Lady of Mount Carmel is celebrated and the "Dancing of the Giglio" is performed for thousands of visitors.

After World War II, the original Italian settlements such as East Harlem declined as Italian Americans moved to the North Bronx, Queens and Brooklyn's southern tier. The geographic shift coincided with a new wave of Italian immigration. An estimated 129,000 to 150,000 Italian immigrants entered New York City between 1945 and 1973. Bypassing Manhattan, they settled in Italian American neighborhoods in the outer boroughs and helped reinvigorate Italian culture and community institutions. With the influx of postwar immigrants, Bensonhurst became the largest Italian community in New York City, with 150,000 Italian Americans in the 1980 census.

The best-known "Little Italy" in Manhattan is the area currently called that, which centers around Mulberry Street. This settlement, however, is rapidly gentrifying as the older Italian residents die and their children move elsewhere. Arthur Avenue in Belmont is now the largest Little Italy in New York City. As of the 2000 census, 692,739 New Yorkers reported Italian ancestry, making them the largest European ethnic group in the city. In 2011, the American Community Survey found there were 49,075 persons of Italian birth in New York.

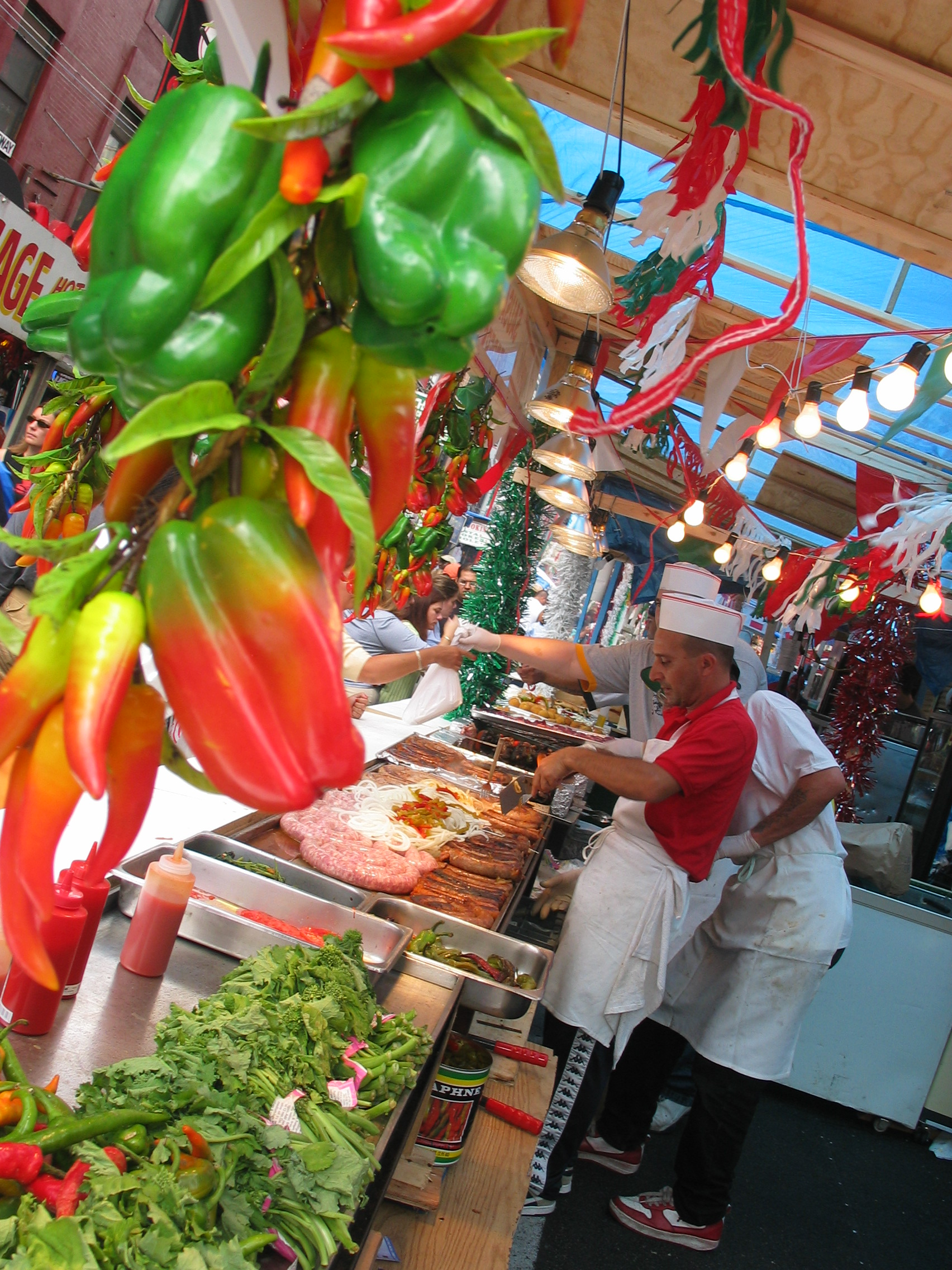
Street vendors at the Feast of San Gennaro in Manhattan's Little Italy.

== Italian-American neighborhoods in New York ==
- Annadale, Staten Island
- Arrochar, Staten Island
- Arthur Avenue (the Bronx's Little Italy)
- Bay Ridge, Brooklyn
- Bensonhurst, Brooklyn (Brooklyn's Little Italy)
- Belmont, Bronx
- Bergen Beach, Brooklyn
- Bushwick, Brooklyn
- Carroll Gardens, Brooklyn
- City Island, Bronx
- Cobble Hill, Brooklyn
- Dongan Hills, Staten Island (Staten Island's Little Italy)
- Dyker Heights, Brooklyn
- East Village, Manhattan
- Eltingville, Staten Island
- Greenwich Village, Manhattan
- Howard Beach, Queens
- Huguenot, Staten Island
- Middle Village, Queens
- Mill Basin, Brooklyn
- Morris Park, Bronx
- Mulberry Street, Little Italy, Manhattan
- Ozone Park, Queens (Queens's Little Italy)
- Park Slope, Brooklyn
- Pelham Bay, Bronx
- Pleasant Avenue, East Harlem (Italian Harlem), Manhattan
- Ridgewood, Queens
- Schuylerville, Bronx
- South Village, Manhattan
- Staten Island
- Throggs Neck, Bronx
- Tottenville, Staten Island
- Whitestone, Queens
- Windsor Terrace, Brooklyn
- Williamsburg, Brooklyn

== Education ==
The Italian international private school La Scuola d'Italia Guglielmo Marconi, serving grades Pre-Kindergarten through 12, is located in Manhattan. It is the sole bilingual English-Italian day school in North America. Despite the large Italian American population, the vast majority of bilingual day schools in North America are French speaking.

== Institutions ==
The Consulate-General of Italy in New York is located on the Upper East Side of Manhattan.

The John D. Calandra Italian American Institute, founded in 1979 and located in Midtown Manhattan, is an academic institute that studies matters pertaining to the history of Italians in the United States.

The Italian American Museum is located in Manhattan's Little Italy. Located in a former bank, Banca Stabile, its current building had a "soft opening" in September 2008, and a formal opening in October.

=== Churches ===
- Church of the Most Precious Blood, Little Italy
- Our Lady of Pompeii Church, Greenwich Village
- St. Anthony of Padua Church, South Village

== Recreation ==
Columbus Day and the San Gennaro Festival are celebrated in New York.

== See also ==
- Italian Americans
- Luigi Fugazy (1839–1930) a prominent Italian padrone and businessman.
- Il Progresso Italo-Americano, daily newspaper 1880–1988
