= Father Demo Square =

Square in Manhattan, New York

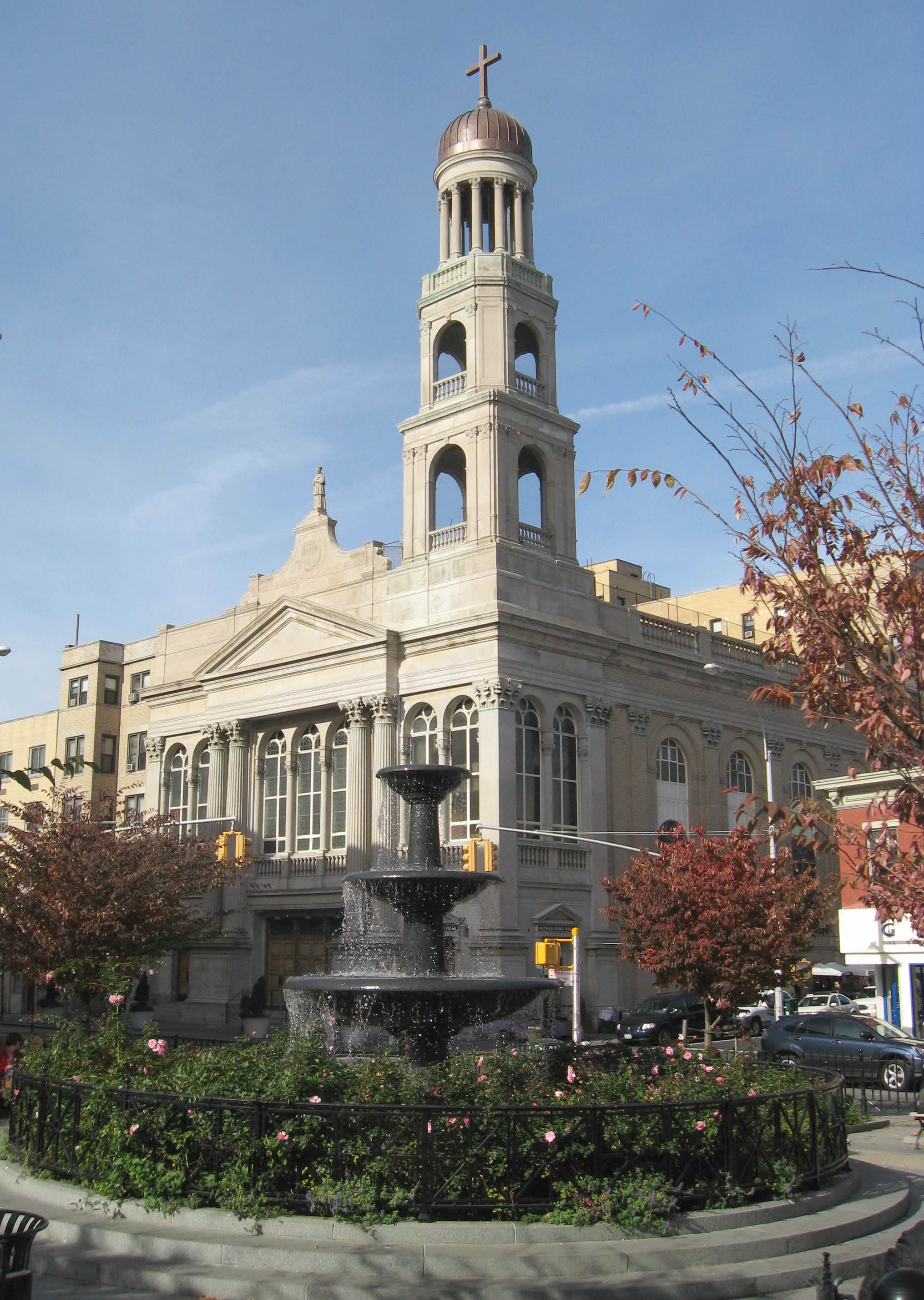
- Square in 2008 with Our Lady of Pompeii Church in the background

- Location within Lower Manhattan Location within New York City Location within New York
- Location: South Village, Manhattan, New York City
- Coordinates: 40°43′48.9″N 74°0′7.9″W
- Area: 0.25 acres (0.10 hectares)
- Created: 1923

Father Demo Square is a 0.25-acre (0.10-hectare) triangular park and piazza bounded by Sixth Avenue, Bleecker Street, and Carmine Street in the South Village neighborhood of Lower Manhattan, New York City. The park is named for Father Antonio Demo, who was the pastor of the neighboring Our Lady of Pompeii Church from 1897 to 1935. The church was relocated to Carmine Street in 1926–1928 to accommodate an extension of Sixth Avenue south of Bleecker Street, which created the triangular plot of land. The park, located opposite Carmine Street from the church, was established in 1923 with the Sixth Avenue extension and the land was improved as a park, being named in a tribute to Demo.

The square was renovated in 2007, which entailed the installation of the current stone fountain, the low fence around the square, and the expansion of the sidewalk into Bleecker and Carmine Streets.

== See also ==
- Italian Americans in New York City
- List of New York City parks
