= Pietro Bandini =

Italian Catholic missionary

The Reverend Pietro Bandini
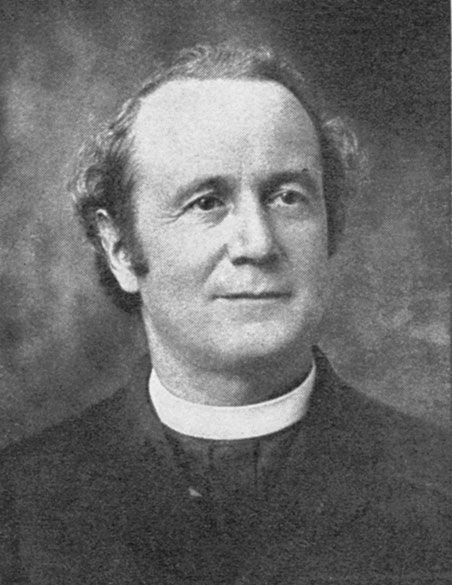
- Bandini in 1898

Orders
- Ordination: September 30, 1877

Personal details
- Born: March 31, 1852 Forlì, Emilia-Romagna, Kingdom of Italy
- Died: January 2, 1917 (aged 64) Little Rock, Arkansas, U.S.
- Buried: Tontitown, Arkansas
- Denomination: Roman Catholic

Pietro Bandini (March 31, 1852 – January 2, 1917) was an Italian Catholic priest and missionary to the United States who was prominent in the Italian American community. He began his career as a Jesuit missionary in the Western United States, where he worked with Native American tribes, and went on to establish the Saint Raphael Society for the Protection of Italian Immigrants and Our Lady of Pompeii Church in New York City. He led a group of Italians to Sunnyside Plantation in Arkansas in the hopes of establishing an immigrant colony and later founded the city of Tontitown with them. For his work on immigration, he was lauded by Pope Pius X and the Queen Mother Margherita.

== Early life ==
Pietro Bandini was born on March 31, 1852, in Forlì, a comune of the Emilia-Romagna region of the Kingdom of Italy to an upper-class family. He had two older brothers, one of whom became a Jesuit priest. He entered the Jesuit novitiate in Monaco in 1869 and remained there, studying philosophy, until 1871. In September 1874, as part of his priestly formation, he began his regency at the Jesuit seminary in Aix en Provence, France, where he studied theology. On September 30, 1877, Bandini was ordained a priest in Bertinoro, Italy, and went on the found a school there.

== Missionary work ==
In 1882, Bandini was sent to the Montana Territory of the United States to work in the Jesuits' Rocky Mountain mission. He was stationed as a missionary in the Sacred Hearts of Jesus and Mary Church in Helena, Montana, where he learned English and various Native American languages. The following year, he was sent to St. Ignatius Mission in St. Ignatius, Montana; there, he built a church and school and preached the faith in Crow and Kootenai villages. Eventually, he established a mission to the Cheyenne Indians.

=== New York City ===
In March 1889, he returned to Italy and was appointed the vice rector of St. Thomas Aquinas College in Cuneo. One year later, Bandini returned to the United States. In 1890, in New York City, Bandini established the Saint Raphael Society for the Protection of Italian Immigrants. The purpose of this society was to care for Italian immigrants to the United States who were subject to usury and labor exploitation. Through the society, Bandini assisted them in a much broader range of matters, such as finding work and housing. He also assisted 20,000 Italians to prepare for their American citizenship examinations by holding instructional classes. In addition to aiding them with their worldly needs, Bandini also tended to the immigrants' spiritual needs in New York by establishing a chapel that he named after Our Lady of Pompeii. This chapel served the Italians in Greenwich Village in Manhattan and was housed in a building at 113 Waverly Place that Bandini purchased. Eventually, this chapel became Our Lady of Pompeii Church, of which Bandini was pastor from 1892 to 1896.

=== Arkansas colony ===
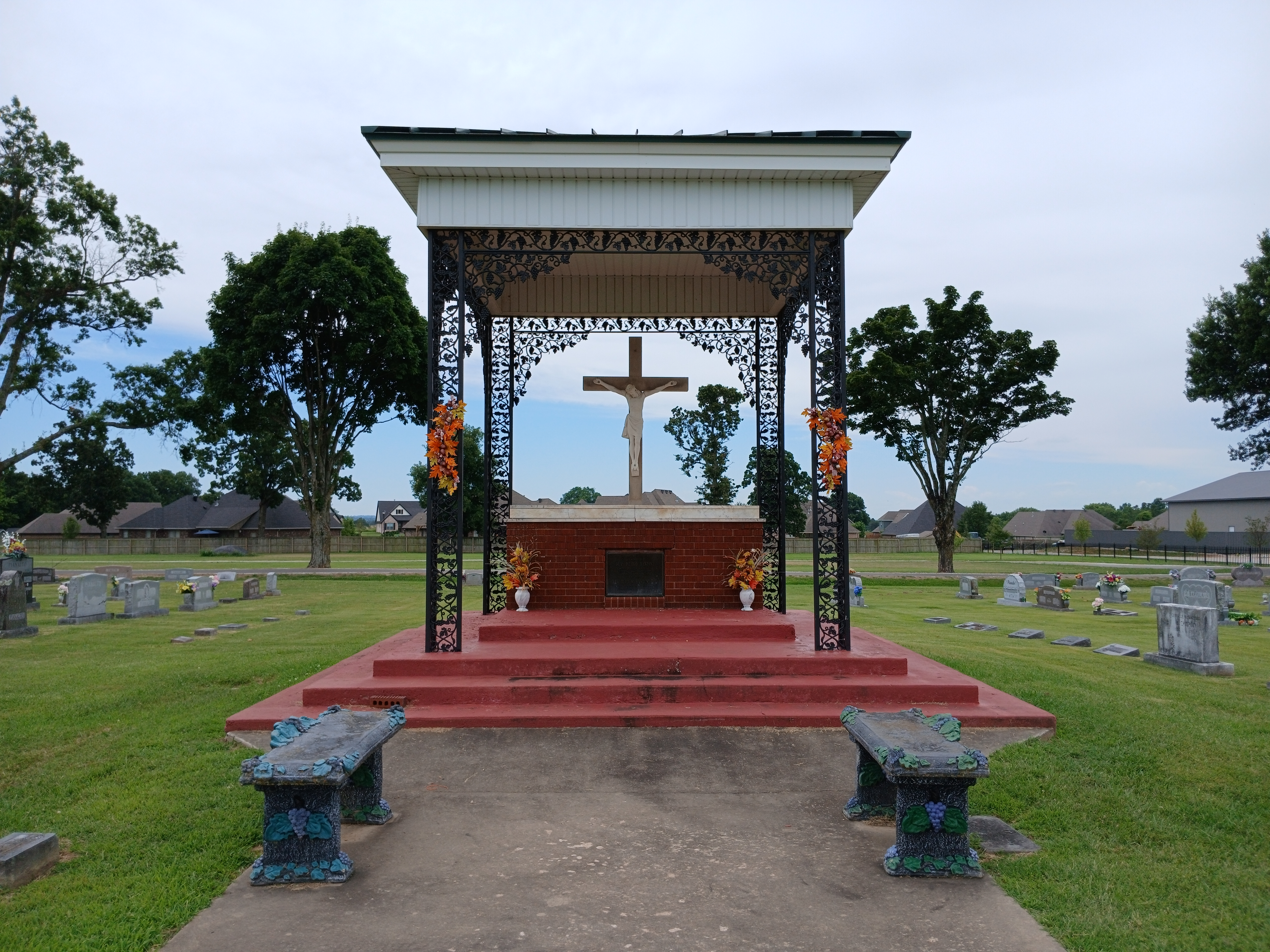
Memorial to Bandini and his nephew in Saint Joseph Cemetery, Tontitown

Bandini theorized that Italian immigrants would prosper if located in a colony whose agricultural environment was similar to that they were used to in Italy. Therefore, in December 1896, his Jesuit superior permitted him to relocate with a group of Italian immigrants to Sunnyside Plantation in Chicot County, Arkansas, whose owner, Austin Corbin, was seeking laborers. Bandini's first wave of Italians arrived in the port of New Orleans on November 26, 1895, and traveled to Sunnyside Plantation. Bandini followed them in January 1897. Immediately, his project met problems, as more than 125 people out of the 100 families that moved to Sunnyside died of malaria due to unsanitary conditions, unsafe drinking water, and a mosquito-favorable climate. The living conditions of the Italians continued to deteriorate when the plantation came under new ownership in June 1896, forcing the few families that could afford to move back to Italy to do so.

Recognizing the squalor of the plantation, Bandini purchased 800 acres (320 hectares) of land in northwest Arkansas, where forty families from Sunnyside had already moved. He believed this land, due to its 1,500-foot (460 m) elevation and workable soil, was sufficiently similar to the Italian climate the immigrants had known. He settled here with his community of Italian immigrants in 1898. This community went on to become incorporated in 1909 as Tontitown, Arkansas, which he named after the Italian explorer Henri de Tonti. Bandini was elected mayor of the city. The first winter forced the residents to live in abandoned farm buildings and survive off of meager sustenance. Bandini then established a schoolhouse and church, and divided the land into ten-acre parcels and distributed the allotments randomly. On the land, the immigrants grew their own food and cultivated grape vineyards, which became commercially prosperous; the Italian ambassador to the United States visited and spoke approvingly of the colony in 1905.

== Later years ==
Bandini returned to Italy in 1911, where his colonization theory of immigration impressed Pope Pius X and the Queen Mother Margherita, who vowed to improve immigration conditions. For his work, Bandini was awarded a gold chalice and set of red vestments from the pope, a medal from the Italian government, and a set of white vestments from the Queen Mother Margherita.

Bandini once again returned to the United States, where he died on January 2, 1917, at St. Vincent Infirmary in Little Rock, Arkansas, and was buried in St. Joseph Cemetery. A memorial to him and his nephew, Tito Bandini, was built in the cemetery.
