= Matthew Del Gaudio =

American architect (1889–1960)

- Born: March 16, 1889
- Died: September 17, 1960 (aged 71); Bedford Park, Bronx, New York City
- Education: Cooper Union; Columbia University
- Occupation: Architect
- Buildings: Our Lady of Pompeii Church
- Military career
- Allegiance: United States
- Branch: (United States) Army Reserve
- Years: 1917–1943
- Rank: Major

Matthew W. Del Gaudio (March 16, 1889–September 17, 1960) was an American architect. He primarily designed churches, apartment buildings, and public housing in New York City.

== Biography ==
Matthew W. Del Gaudio was born on March 16, 1889, and attended Public School 83 in New York City. Upon graduation, he enrolled at Cooper Union and received his degree in 1908. From 1905 to 1909, Del Gaudio worked as a draftsman at Moore & Lanseidel, partially overlapping with his time at Cooper Union. From 1917 to 1919, he served in World War I and again in World War II in the U.S. Army Reserve, remaining in the Reserves until 1943, when he was discharged with the rank of major. He eventually opened his own practice, which was based at 545 Fifth Avenue in Manhattan. He was licensed as an architect in New York, New Jersey, Illinois, and California.

He was a member of the New York Society of Architects from 1930 to 1937, and was its president between 1935 and 1937. Additionally, he was the director of the New York State chapter of the American Institute of Architects from 1941 to 1945 and the president of the New York State Association of Architects from 1945 to 1947. In 1956, Del Gaudio received the Cooper Union President's Citation and, in 1958, the Gano Dunn Award, and was admitted into the Cooper Union Hall of Fame in 2009.

Del Gaudio died on September 17, 1960, at the age of 71 in his home at 2873 Bainbridge Avenue in The Bronx. In 1971, the New York State chapter of the American Institute of Architects created the annual Matthew W. Del Gaudio Service Award, which is presented to a member for service to the organization and advancement of the profession.

== Architectural works ==
Del Gaudio designed or was the supervising architect on:

- Gravesend Houses in Coney Island
- Our Lady of Pompeii Church and School in Greenwich Village, Manhattan - for this project, Del Gaudio was personally selected by Antonio Demo, the pastor of the church
- Patterson Houses in the Mott Haven section of The Bronx
- St. Joseph Church in Chinatown
- Vladeck Houses on the Lower East Side of Manhattan
