= Arthur Crooks =

American architect

- Born: 1838; England
- Died: 1888 (aged 49–50); New York City
- Known for: Architect

Arthur Crooks (1838–1888) was an English-American architect who practiced from offices located in New York City. He was highly regarded for his design of ecclesiastical buildings in New York and Connecticut for Roman Catholic clients.

== Early life and career ==
Crooks was born in 1838 in England and immigrated to America prior to the Civil War. He was employed by architect and fellow Englishman Richard Upjohn before starting his own firm in the 1860s. Crooks died unexpectedly in December 1888.

== Works Include ==
=== Connecticut ===
- St. Patrick Church, Waterbury, Connecticut

=== New York ===
- Theiss Music Hall, New York City
- Kingston City Hall, Kingston, New York
- St. Peter's Church, Rosendale, New York
- St. Joseph Church, Middletown, New York
- St. Anthony of Padua Church, New York City
- St. John the Evangelist Church, New York City
- St. Joseph Church, alteration, New York City
- Sacred Heart Rectory, New York City
