= End of slavery in the United States =

Abolition of slavery in the various states of the US over time: Abolition of slavery during or shortly after the American Revolution (Vermont, 1777; Massachusetts [including Maine], 1783) The Northwest Ordinance, 1787 Gradual emancipation in New York (starting 1799, ended 1827), Pennsylvania (1780–1857), New Hampshire (1783–1857), Connecticut [including the Western Reserve] (1784–1848), Rhode Island (1784–1853) and New Jersey (starting 1804; ended by Thirteenth Amendment, 1865) The Missouri Compromise, 1821 Effective abolition of slavery by Mexican or joint US/British authority Abolition of slavery by Congressional action, 1861 Abolition of slavery by Congressional action, 1862 Emancipation Proclamation as originally issued, 1 Jan 1863 Subsequent operation of the Emancipation Proclamation in 1863 Abolition of slavery by state action during the Civil War Operation of the Emancipation Proclamation in 1864 Operation of the Emancipation Proclamation in 1865 Thirteenth Amendment to the US constitution, 18 Dec 1865 Territory incorporated into the US after the passage of the Thirteenth Amendment

From the late 18th century to the 1860s, various states of the United States (and its federal district (D.C.); and territories) allowed the enslavement of human beings, most of whom had been transported from Africa during the Atlantic slave trade or were descendants of people who had. The institution of chattel slavery was established in North America in the 16th century under Spanish, British, French, and Dutch colonization. As the colonies that would become the United States developed, slavery became especially important to the Southern economy, where enslaved labor was used to produce major agricultural crops.

The National Park Service explains that slavery also became one of the major issues dividing the country and eventually contributed to the conflict that led to the American Civil War (1861–1865). After the United States was founded in 1776, the country split into slave states (states permitting slavery) and free states (states prohibiting slavery). Slavery became concentrated in the Southern United States. The Act Prohibiting Importation of Slaves banned the Atlantic slave trade starting in 1808, but not the domestic slave trade or slavery itself. Slavery was finally ended throughout the entire country after the American Civil War, in which the U.S. government defeated a confederation of rebelling slave states that attempted to secede from the U.S. During the war, U.S. president Abraham Lincoln issued the Emancipation Proclamation, which ordered the liberation of all slaves in rebelling states. In December 1865, the Thirteenth Amendment to the U.S. Constitution was ratified, abolishing chattel slavery nationwide. Native American slave ownership also persisted until 1866, when the federal government negotiated new treaties with the "Five Civilized Tribes" in which they agreed to end slavery. Some argue slavery continues to exist because the Thirteenth Amendment contains an exception for people convicted of a crime.

In June 2021, Juneteenth, a day that commemorates the end of slavery in the U.S., became a federal holiday.

== Background ==
Chattel slavery was established throughout the Western Hemisphere ("New World") during the era of European colonization. During the American Revolutionary War (1775–1783), the rebelling states, also known as the Thirteen Colonies, limited or banned the importation of new slaves in the Atlantic Slave Trade and states split into slave and free states, when some of the rebelling states began to abolish the institution. Slavery became an ever more contentious issue in the 19th century, leading to major controversies and compromises, especially with respect to whether new states would be admitted as slave states or free states.

== American Civil War ==
The Civil War in the United States from 1861 until 1865 was between the United States of America ("the Union" or "the North") and the Confederate States of America (Southern states that voted to secede: "the Confederacy" or "the South"). (Note: A formal declaration of war by the United States was never issued by either the United States Congress or the Congress of the Confederate States, as their legal positions made it unnecessary.) The central cause of the war was the status of slavery, especially whether to allow it to expand into territories acquired after the Mexican–American War. On the eve of the Civil War in 1860, four million of the 32 million Americans (nearly 13 percent) were black enslaved people, mainly in the southern United States.

The practice of slavery in the United States was one of the key political issues of the 19th century; decades of political unrest over slavery led up to the war. At the start of the Civil War, there were 34 states in the United States, 15 of which permitted slavery. After Lincoln's election but before he took office, seven of these slave states, after conventions devoted to the topic, issued declarations of secession from the United States and created the Confederate States of America. Four more joined them after the war began, and all eleven were represented in the Confederate Congress. The slave states that stayed in the Union – Maryland, Missouri, Delaware, and Kentucky (called border states) – continued to be represented in the U.S. Congress. Because the Emancipation Proclamation, which was issued on January 1, 1863, applied only to states "in rebellion", it did not apply in the border states, nor in Tennessee, because Tennessee had come under Union control. During the war, the abolition of slavery was required by President Abraham Lincoln for the readmission of Confederate states.

The U.S. Congress, after the departure of the powerful Southern contingent in 1861, was generally anti-slavery. In a plan endorsed by Abraham Lincoln, slavery in the District of Columbia, which the Southern contingent had protected, was abolished in 1862. The Union-occupied territories of Louisiana and eastern Virginia, which had been exempted from the Emancipation Proclamation, also abolished slavery through state constitutions drafted in 1864. The State of Arkansas, which was not exempt but came partly under Union control by 1864, adopted an anti-slavery constitution in March of that year. The border states of Maryland (November 1864) and Missouri (January 1865), and the Union-occupied Confederate state, Tennessee (January 1865), all abolished slavery prior to the end of the Civil War, as did the new state of West Virginia (February 1865), which had separated from Virginia in 1863 over the issue of slavery. However, slavery persisted in Delaware, Kentucky, and (to a very limited extent) in New Jersey – and on the books in 7 of 11 of the former Confederate states.

== Emancipation Proclamation ==
The Emancipation Proclamation was a presidential proclamation and executive order issued by United States President Abraham Lincoln on January 1, 1863, during the Civil War. Lincoln preceded it with the Preliminary Emancipation Proclamation on September 22, 1862, which read:

That on the first day of January in the year of our Lord, one thousand eight hundred and sixty-three, all persons held as slaves within any State, or designated part of a State, the people whereof shall then be in rebellion against the United States shall be then, thenceforward, and forever free; and the executive government of the United States, including the military and naval authority thereof, will recognize and maintain the freedom of such persons, and will do no act or acts to repress such persons, or any of them, in any efforts they may make for their actual freedom.

On January 1, 1863, the Proclamation changed the legal status under federal law of more than 3.5 million enslaved African Americans in the secessionist Confederate states from enslaved to free. As soon as enslaved people escaped the control of their masters, either by running away across Union lines or by being left behind when their masters fled the advance of federal troops, they became permanently free. However, the Emancipation Proclamation did not immediately abolish slavery throughout the entire country. It applied only in areas in rebellion and allowed slavery to continue in loyal states and territories. The proclamation was a wartime measure rather than a permanent ban on slavery. It required the Thirteenth Amendment's ratification on December 6, 1865, to fully end chattel slavery in the United States.

The Emancipation Proclamation nevertheless represented a major change in the federal government's position on slavery. It connected the Union's military effort directly to emancipation and allowed African American men to serve in the United States military. The proclamation also changed the purpose of the war by making the destruction of slavery an important part of the Union's war effort. It also ended the threat to the Union that Britain and France, which were anti-slavery, would recognize the Confederacy. U.S. Secretary of State William Henry Seward reminded "Europeans that Lincoln's proclamation made intervention tantamount to rescuing American slavery from its doom".

== Juneteenth ==
On June 19, 1865 – Juneteenth – U.S. Army general Gordon Granger arrived in Galveston, Texas, and announced General Order No. 3, proclaiming freedom for slaves in Texas, which was the last state of the Confederacy with slavery. Juneteenth has been celebrated annually on June 19 ever since in various parts of the United States. It became a federal holiday in the United States on June 17, 2021, when President Joe Biden signed the Juneteenth National Independence Day Act into law. It is observed not only to commemorate the emancipation of African-American slaves but also to celebrate African-American culture.

During the American Civil War (1861–1865), emancipation came at different times to different places in the Southern United States. Large celebrations of emancipation, often called Jubilees (recalling the biblical Jubilee in which enslaved people were freed) occurred on September 22, January 1, July 4, August 1, April 6, and November 1, among other dates. Although June 19, 1865, was not the actual end of slavery even in Texas (like the Emancipation Proclamation, General Gordon's military order had to be acted upon), and although it has competed with other dates for emancipation's celebration, ordinary African Americans created, preserved, and spread a shared commemoration of slavery's wartime demise across the United States.

== Thirteenth Amendment to the United States Constitution ==
The Thirteenth Amendment (Amendment XIII) to the United States Constitution abolished slavery and involuntary servitude, except as punishment for a crime. It was passed by the Senate on April 8, 1864, and by the House of Representatives on January 31, 1865. The Thirteenth Amendment was ratified by the 27th of the then 36 states, fulfilling the constitutional requirement of ratification by 3/4 of states, on December 6, 1865. Secretary of State William H. Seward announced the adoption of the Thirteenth Amendment on December 18, 1865.

The Thirteenth Amendment was the first of the three Reconstruction Amendments adopted following the American Civil War, the other two being the Fourteenth and Fifteenth Amendments. The amendment's passage did more than end an existing institution; it established a constitutional principle that slavery could no longer legally exist in the United States.Ultimately, the abolition of slavery was a long and complicated process. The United States moved from a nation divided over the existence and expansion of slavery to one in which slavery was constitutionally prohibited.

== Padrone Act of 1874 ==
The end of slavery effectively occurred with the federal Padrone Act of 1874 (18 Stat. 251), which was enacted on June 23, 1874, "in response to exploitation of immigrant children in forced begging and street crime by criminalizing the practice of enslaving, buying, selling, or holding any person in involuntary servitude."

== Brussels Conference and slavery in the 20th century ==
Since the abolition of slavery in the United States in 1865, efforts have been made to eliminate other forms of slavery. In 1890, the Brussels Conference Act adopted a collection of anti-slavery measures to end the slave trade on land and sea. In 1904, the International Agreement for the suppression of the White Slave Traffic was signed. In 1926, the Convention to Suppress the Slave Trade and Slavery was ratified.

Even after slavery became illegal more than a century ago, many criminal organizations continued to engage in human trafficking and slave trading. For this reason, human trafficking was made a federal crime. In 2000, the Victims of Trafficking and Violence Protection Act of 2000 was signed.

== Slavery in the 21st century ==
In 2014, the Human Trafficking Prevention Act was created. It amended the Trafficking Victims Protection Act of 2000 to require training for federal government personnel related to trafficking in persons. On 12 Dec 2000 the Protocol to Prevent, Suppress and Punish Trafficking in Persons, Especially Women and Children was adopted by the United Nations General Assembly, and the United Nations Office on Drugs and Crime was put in charge of implementing the protocol. In 2002, the Polaris Project was founded. Polaris is one of the few organizations working on all forms of trafficking, including both sex trafficking and labor trafficking. It furnishes support for survivors, whether male, female, transgender, or children, and whether U.S. citizens or foreign nationals.

== Media ==
- The documentary film, 13th, explores the "intersection of race, justice, and mass incarceration in the United States." Its title alludes to the Thirteenth Amendment to the United States Constitution, adopted in 1865, which abolished slavery and involuntary servitude in the United States, except as a punishment for a crime. The film asserts that slavery has since been silently perpetuated by criminalizing behavior and enabling police to arrest poor black people and forcing them to work for the state. In addition, "carceral states" are managed by for-profit prison corporations.
- Traces of the Trade: A Story from the Deep North, is a 2008 documentary film that focuses on the descendants of the DeWolf family, a prominent slave-trading family who settled in Bristol, Rhode Island and trafficked Africans from 1769 to 1820, and on the legacy of the slave trade in the North of the United States.

== See also ==
- Timeline of abolition of slavery and serfdom
- History of civil rights in the United States
- Abolitionism
- History of unfree labor in the United States
- Slave Trade Act
- Slavery Abolition Act 1833
- Abolitionism in the United Kingdom
- Supplementary Convention on the Abolition of Slavery
- Slavery in the 21st century
- Convict leasing
