= Padrone Act of 1874 =

United States Act

- Long title: An Act to protect persons of foreign birth against forcible constraint or involuntary servitude.
- Enacted by: the 43rd United States Congress
- Effective: June 23, 1874

Citations
- Public law: Pub. L. 43–464
- Statutes at Large: 18 Stat. 251

Codification
- Titles amended: 18 U.S.C.: Crimes and Criminal Procedure
- U.S.C. sections created: 18 U.S.C. ch. 77 §§ 1581–1588

Legislative history
- Introduced in the House as H.R. 3581 by John Cessna (R-PA) on June 1, 1874; Passed the House on June 1, 1874 (Passed); Passed the Senate on June 22, 1874 (Passed); Signed into law by President Ulysses S. Grant on June 23, 1874

Padrone Act of 1874 (18 Stat. 251) was authorized by the 43rd United States Congress and enacted into law in the United States on June 23, 1874. The Act of Congress was a response to the exploitation of immigrant children dependent on forced begging which criminalized the practice of enslaving, buying, selling, or holding any person in involuntary servitude.

According to the US Department of State brochures and resources on human trafficking and slavery, the 1874 statute is recognized being a milestone legal force as regards the vulnerabilities of human chattel condition and law of the United States. In sum, the law was an anti-slavery law and the first human trafficking law criminalizing the slavery, buying and selling of Italians and Sicilians.

In the chronology of slavery, the University of Houston shows that in 1874 Congress enacted the Padrone statute "to prevent the practice of enslaving, buying, selling, or using Italian children" as street musicians and urchins.

1948 Federal criminal law is amended to enact 18 U.S.C. §§ 1581–1588, which ban peonage and involuntary servitude. The amendments are a consolidation of the 1874 Padrone Statute (formerly 18 U.S.C. § 446 (1940 ed.)) and the 1808 Slave Trade statute, as amended in 1909 (18 U.S.C. § 423 (1940 ed.)).

In the 1870s, according to the New York Times article "Slavery in New York", Aug. 21, 1873, the New York Times addresses Italian and Sicilian slavery that exists in 1873. This is referenced in the US Department of Labor resources.

== Associated United States Federal Statute ==
United States legislation establishing criminal punishment and penal code as related to peonage and slave trade purposes for the contiguous United States.

Date of Enactment	Public Law Number	Statute Citation	Legislative Bill	Presidential Administration
March 4, 1909	P.L. 60-350	35 Stat. 1088	S. 2982	Theodore Roosevelt

== See also ==
- Atlantic slave trade
- End of slavery in the United States
- Padrone system
