= Antonio Demo =

Italian-American priest

The Reverend Antonio Demo C.S.
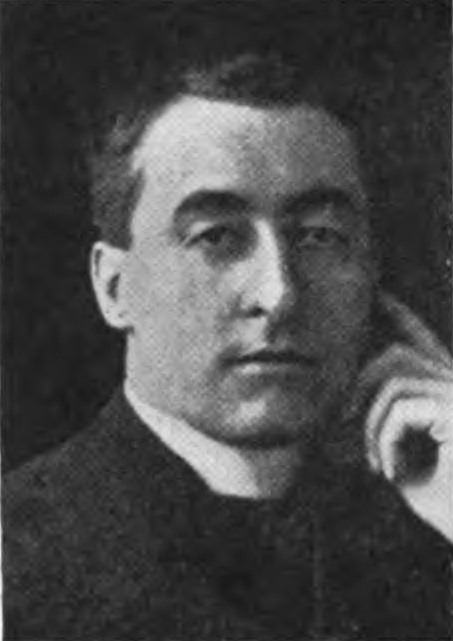

Orders
- Ordination: July 20, 1896

Personal details
- Born: April 23, 1870 Lazzaretto di Bassano, Veneto, Italy
- Died: January 2, 1936 (aged 65) New York City, United States
- Denomination: Catholic

Antonio Demo CS (April 23, 1870 – January 2, 1936) was an Italian American Catholic priest and civic activist.

== Career ==
Demo studied at seminaries in Italy and entered the Scalabrinian Order in 1894. Prior to his ordination, Demo served in the Italian military. He was ordained a priest on July 20, 1896, the same year he emigrated to the United States.

He initially did missionary work for two years in the parish of the Sacred Heart in Boston, which served a congregation of Italian immigrants mostly from Genoa. On July 19, 1899, he was assigned as assistant pastor of Our Lady of Pompeii Church, established in 1892 by Fr Pietro Bandini in New York City's Greenwich Village on Bleecker and Carmine Streets. In 1900, he was appointed pastor of the church, which served what was then one of largest Italian-American communities in America.

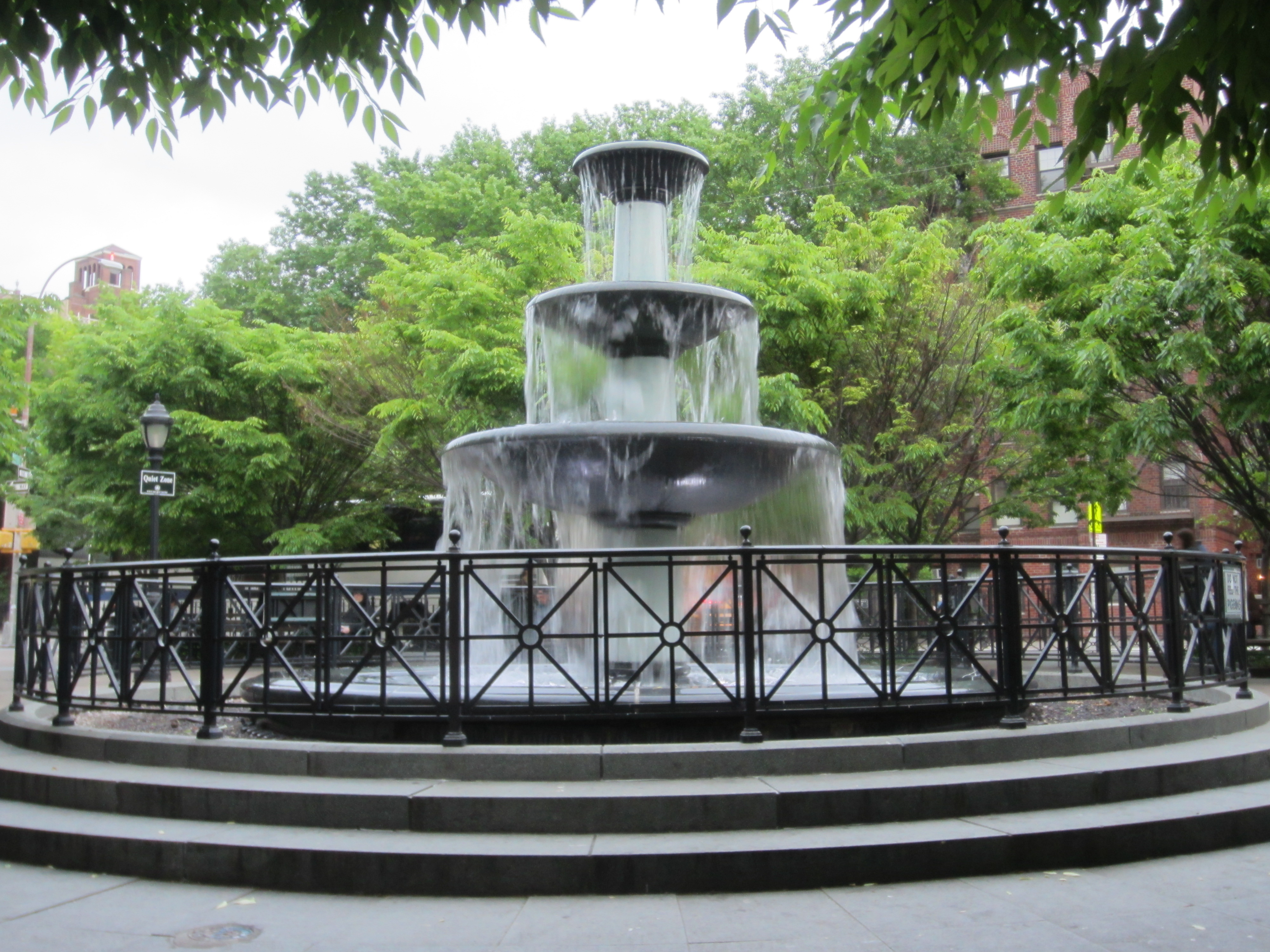
Father Demo Square

Demo exercised his apostolate among the Italian immigrants, serving until 1923 also as the director of the St. Raphael Society for the Protection of Italian Immigrants, an organization that had been specifically formed in 1891 by Bandini to assist newly arrived immigrants and that he helped to strengthen. His spiritual care and leadership were put to test on March 25, 1911, when he had to respond to the tragic Triangle Shirtwaist Company fire, which claimed the lives of 146 female employees. Because of his many merits in the care of the Italian community, he was decorated with the "Cross of Knight of the Crown of Italy".

In 1923 Demo learned that the church would have to be demolished to allow extension of the Sixth Avenue. Father Demo organized a campaign to buy a nearby property and with the help of a leading Italian American architect, Matthew Del Gaudio, build a new church and rectory. The new church was available for the congregation in May 1927. In late summer of 1931, the parochial school also was opened.

In 1935, Demo became Pompeii's pastor emeritus and superintendent of its parochial school. He died in 1936 in Greenwich Village in New York City, and thousands of parishioners and friends, including Mayor Fiorello La Guardia, paid their respects.

== Legacy ==
In 1941, the intersection of Bleecker Street and Sixth Avenue was named Father Demo Square. In 2009, after a renovation, Father Demo Square was honored with a Village Award by the Greenwich Village Society for Historic Preservation.

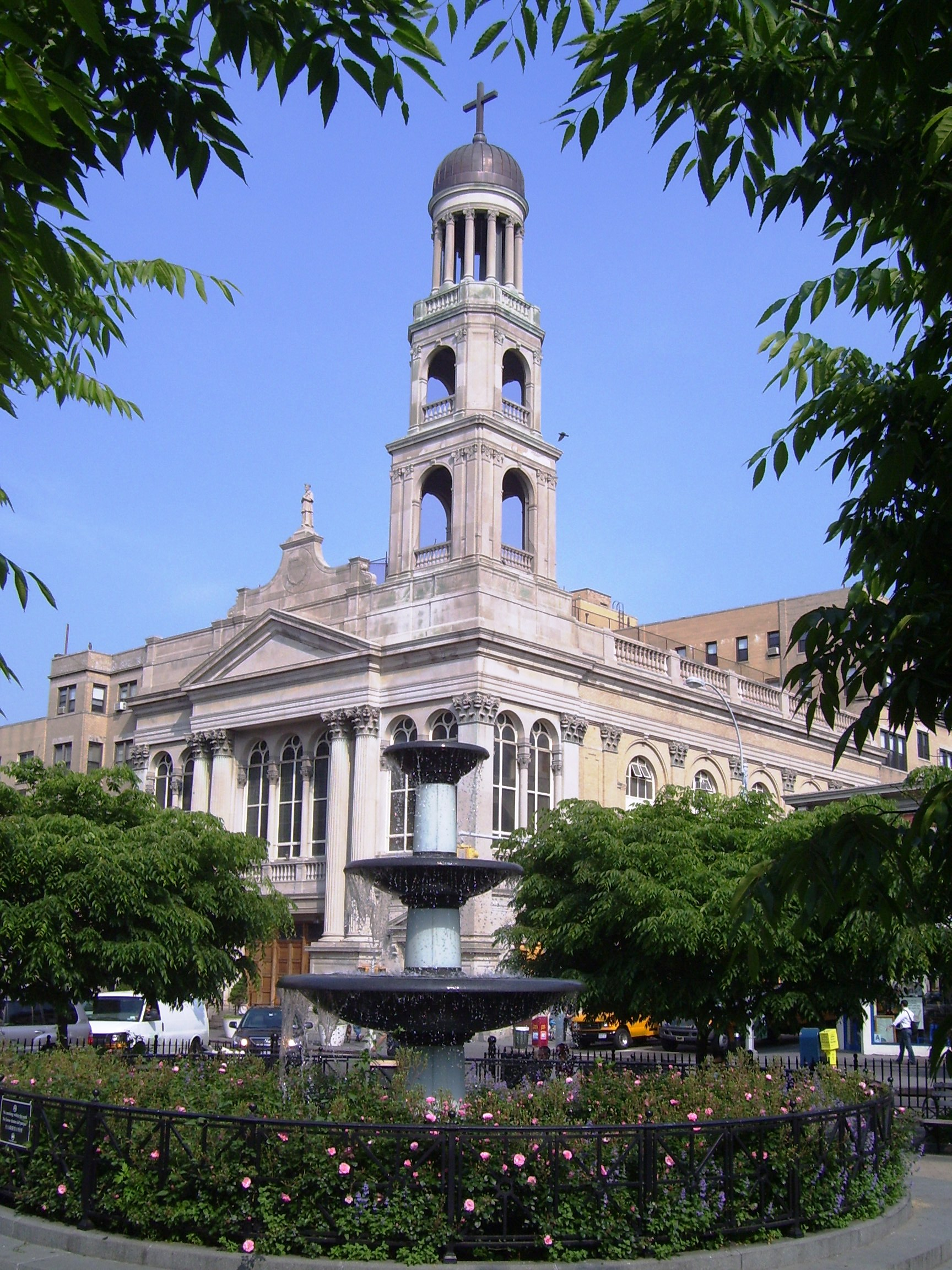
Our Lady of Pompeii Church as seen through Father Demo Square
