= St. Anthony of Padua Church (Manhattan) =

Coordinates: 40°43′38″N 74°00′05″W

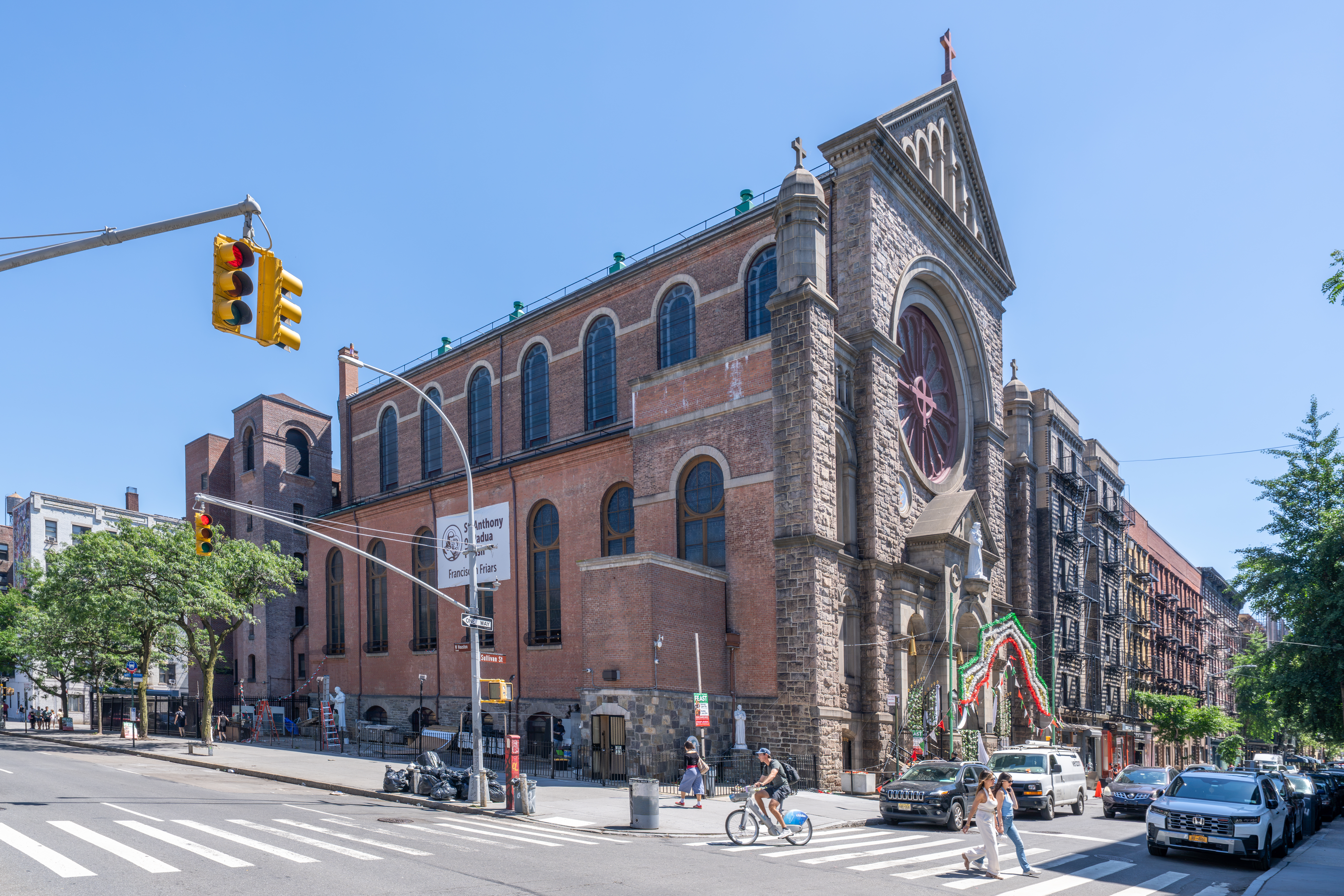
- This photo shows the decorated Sullivan Street facade (right) and the plain Houston Street side, which was originally hidden by tenement buildings (left)
- St. Anthony of Padua Church
- Location: 154 Sullivan Street, New York, New York 10012
- Country: United States
- Denomination: Catholic Church
- Religious institute: Order of Friars Minor
- Website: http://www.stanthonynyc.org/

History
- Status: active
- Founded: (First parish) 1859; (re-established) 1866
- Founder(s): Rev. Mr. Sanguinetti; Friar Leo Pacilio
- Dedication: St. Anthony of Padua
- Dedicated: April 10, 1866 (first church);

Architecture
- Architect: Arthur Crooks
- Style: Romanesque Revival
- Years built: 1886–1888

Administration
- Archdiocese: New York

Clergy
- Pastor: Rev. Mario Julian

The Church of St. Anthony of Padua is a Catholic parish church in the Archdiocese of New York, located at 155 Sullivan Street at the corner of West Houston Street, in the South Village and SoHo neighborhoods of Manhattan, New York City. It was established in 1859 as the first parish in the United States formed specifically to serve the Italian immigrant community.

== History ==
The parish was founded by a priest named Sanguinetti who had come from Italy with the approval of John Hughes, the Archbishop of New York, to help provide the services of the Catholic faith to his countrymen who had emigrated to the United States. With no clergy available to serve these immigrants in their native language, many had stopped practicing the faith or had begun to join other denominations. The congregation initially worshiped at the former site of the Church of St. Vincent de Paul built in 1841 on Canal Street, which Sanguinetti leased from that parish. He lasted in that ministry for only about a year, however, as he returned to his homeland, feeling overwhelmed and disheartened from the various obstacles which arose for the parish.

The Italian community did not wish to lose the work Sanguinetti had begun. Hughes' successor, John McCloskey, appealed for help to Pamfilo of Magliano, the Minister Provincial of the Franciscan friars then based at St. Bonaventure College in Allegheny, New York. Father Pamfilo agreed to take responsibility for this ministry. He assigned Friar Leo Pacilio, a native of Naples, to this task. The parish was thus re-established in 1866 at what had been built in 1839 at 149 Sullivan Street as the Sullivan Street Methodist Episcopal Church, which had relocated to become the Washington Square United Methodist Church. The parish was served by the Franciscan friars, who continue to administer it. The church was solemnly dedicated on April 10, 1866, by McCloskey, by then the first cardinal of New York.

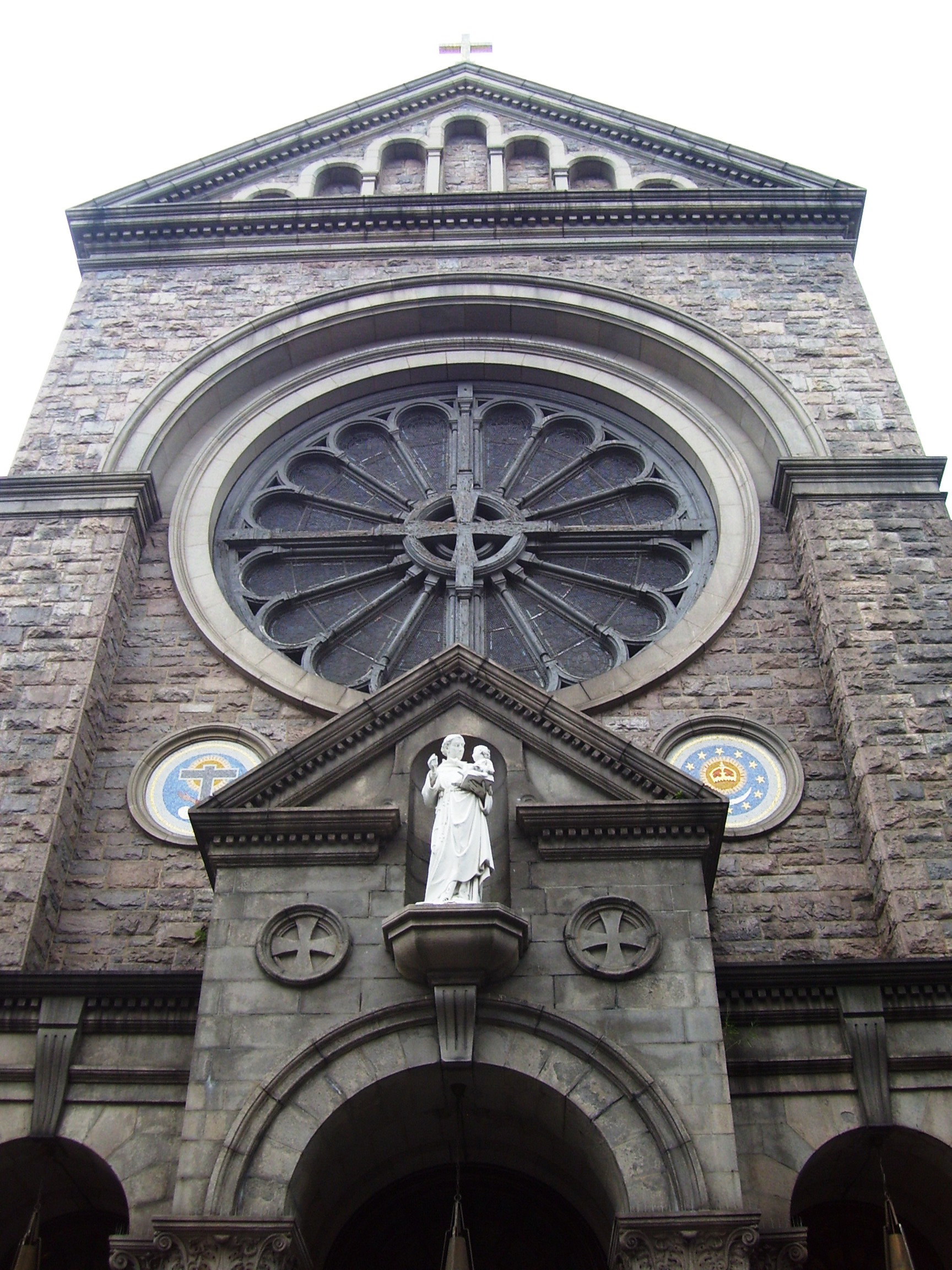
A view of the facade of the church

Between 1886 and 1888, the parish funded the building of a new church on Sullivan Street, designed by Arthur Crooks in the Romanesque Revival style. The friars had originally taken up residence with the first church structure, but by this period a separate friary was built for them on Thompson Street directly behind the church. This came to also serve as provincial headquarters for their Minister Provincial.

The Houston Street facade of the building was originally blocked by tenement buildings, which were demolished when Houston Street was widened in the early 1930s, exposing the plain facade. The church now uses this space as a garden. From 1902 to 2005 the parish operated a school (K–8) on Mac Dougal Street.

=== Father Fagan Park ===
On the night of November 4, 1938, the friary caught fire. A young friar, Richard Fagan, initially escaped the flames but then went back into the building twice to rescue two other friars, Fathers Louis Vitale and Bonaventure Pons. Returning a third time, he was trapped and badly burned. He escaped by breaking through a window and landed on the roof of a neighboring building. He was found and taken to Columbus Hospital, where he died of his injuries at the age of 27. A small park at the intersection of Sixth Avenue and Prince Streets was named in his honor by the City of New York in 1941.

== Pastors ==
- Rev. Father Leo Pacilio (1866–?)
- Rev. Joachim Guerrini (?–1871)
- Rev. James Titta (1871–1877)
- Rev. Anacletus Di Angelis (1877–1890)
- Rev. Arthur Lattanzi (c. 1950s, 1960s)
- Rev. Roderick Crispo (1970s)
- Rev. Felician Napoli (1970s)
- Rev. Patrick D. Boyle (1980s)
- Rev. Daniel B. Morey (1990s)
- Rev. Joseph F. Lorenzo (1990s)
- Rev. Mario Julian (through 2022)
- Rev. Michael Corcione (2022 - present)

== See also ==
- Our Lady of Pompeii Church
- Italian Americans in New York City
