= Padrone system =

System of immigration to the United States

The padrone system was a contract labor system utilized by many immigrant groups to find employment in the United States, most notably Italian, but also Greeks, Chinese, Japanese, and Mexican Americans. The word 'padrone' is an Italian word meaning 'boss', 'manager' or 'owner' when translated into English. The system was a complex network of business relationships formed to meet a growing need for skilled and unskilled workers. Padrones were labor brokers, usually immigrants or first-generation Americans themselves, who acted as middlemen between immigrant workers and employers.

Transoceanic travel became more efficient and less expensive due to introduction of the steamship in the 1860s. This made enticements by labor agents attractive to individuals who were looking for better wages, but did not want to make the United States their permanent home. In the U.S., these 'birds of passage' were employed in growth areas nationwide where the local labor force was too small. They worked for mining and railroad companies and agribusinesses, dug canals, and raised livestock.

The Padrone Act of 1874 was an attempt to ban the system. and by the late 19th century and early 20th century, both the government and the Italian immigrant community struggled to fight the system. The government enacted laws, and the Italian immigrant community by organizing movements. The system was virtually extinct by 1911. The First World War stopped the flow of immigrants from Europe from August 1914; it finally abolished the system.

== Negative and positive images ==
Harney reexamines the negative image of the padrone system, in which immigrants are viewed practically as powerless slaves. This image relies on the assumption that the immigrants, especially men from southern Italy, were too stupid to understand what was happening and too ignorant to learn from the many immigrants who had already returned to their village. In reality, Harney argues, padrones were both exploiters and helpful patrons of the immigrants. They provided jobs the immigrants would not otherwise find. They provided housing, food, and transportation to the highest paying jobs available the padrone could discover. They were the spokesmen and advocates for the immigrants versus the police and local authorities and prevented them from being exploited by the company that hired them. Padrones served as the cultural link to Italy. They facilitated letters, the sending of money back to the families, and arranging transportation back when the term of employment was over. The padrone was paid for his services, taking money both from the immigrant and from the employer. Complaints that some took too much money led to criticism for "exploitation."

According to historian Alfred T. Banfield:

Criticized by many as slave traders who preyed upon poor, bewildered peasants, the 'padroni' often served as travel agents, with fees reimbursed from paychecks, as landlords who rented out shacks and boxcars, and as storekeepers who extended exorbitant credit to their Italian laborer clientele. Despite such abuse, not all 'padroni' were dastardly and most Italian immigrants reached out to their 'padroni' for economic salvation, considering them either as godsends or necessary evils. The Italians whom the 'padroni' brought to Maine generally had no intention of settling there, and most were sojourners who either returned to Italy or moved on to another job somewhere else. Nevertheless, thousands of Italians did settle in Maine, creating "Little Italies" in Portland, Millinocket, Rumford, and other towns where the 'padroni' remained as strong shaping forces in the new communities.

Celso Caesar Moreno was an international adventurer of Italian origin. In 1886, he fought the padrone system persuading Congressman Henry B. Lovering of Massachusetts to introduce a bill to ban importation of slave contract labor from Italy into the United States. On October 29, 1895, Moreno was condemned for libel against Italian minister to the United States, Baron Saverio Fava, whom he had accused of corruption.

Italian emigration inspector Adolfo Rossi, following an investigative journey across the United States in 1904 for the Italian General Commissariat of Emigration (Italian: Commissariato Generale dell'Emigrazione), urged the Italian government to provide legal assistance to emigrants and to support their employment and job placement. His goal was to protect impoverished migrants—many of whom were illiterate and unfamiliar with the English language—from exploitation by criminal networks and local bosses operating through the padrone system. The practical realization of these recommendations became the focus of his second mission in 1905. Among the proposals he advanced were the creation of dedicated funds that consuls could use to defend Italian nationals in court, and the establishment of a labour office in New York, with branches in key emigration hubs. These measures were eventually implemented, though with some modifications.

== Sources of padrone income ==
Collecting payments for transportation was just one of the methods padrones used to augment their income. Sometimes families would contract or sell their sons into servitude to a padrone. The terms of the contract ranged from a sum paid to the parents to exchanging passage for labor. Immigrant workers were also charged a fee for initial job placements, and often had to pay a monthly fee in order to keep the position. Pozetta shows that in Florida, railroads allowed padrones to run the commissaries at job sites, and there were complaints that they charged a 50 to 100% markup. However, he concludes, the padrone system, with its faults, on the whole was a success. Pozetta says:

The padrone served the needs of American employers such as the Florida East Coast Railway and immigrant newcomers by acting as a middle man. Native businessmen rarely understood the old world traditions, customs, and languages of foreign workers and, hence, found it difficult or impossible to deal with them directly. This was particularly true of employers, such as those in Florida, who were away from the immigrant-filled cities of the North. Similarly, these newcomers often were ignorant of American employment practices and economic trends. For the most part they lacked contacts with native firms, and few possessed the language skills necessary to acquire them. Labor agents [padrones] were normally foreigners themselves who had acquired some use of English and who had made connections with American contractors. As such they were in a position to act as intermediaries between the country's burgeoning economy and the immigrant masses.

== Corporate predecessors of padrones ==
The American Emigrant Company (AEC) was established in 1864 to take advantage of the “act to encourage immigration” passed by Congress that same year. Its mission was to transport skilled and unskilled workers from Europe directly to North American companies suffering labor shortages. Potential candidates found the length of service required, at least a year, unappealing; only a few thousand workers ever contracted with the company. Additionally, individuals who accepted employment through AEC frequently abandoned their positions at the first opportunity to do so. By 1870, the American Emigrant Company was bankrupt.

A group of Chinese merchants, known as the Six Companies, oversaw the emigration of 180,000 Chinese immigrants to the American Northwest between 1849 and 1882 from its base in San Francisco, California. The Chinese organization did not sign contracts until after arrival stateside; it preferred a credit-ticket system. Under the auspices of a company agent, immigrants then entered contracts with American corporations that not only specified length of employment but which also allowed for garnishment of wages to reimburse the Six Companies for ship tickets and other expenditures.

Although recognized as hard workers, Chinese immigrants had to frequently go on strike to protest low wages and physical abuse. In contrast, the presence of Chinese workers or rumors of their imminent arrival on a job site spurred white laborers to join unions and refuse membership to the Chinese. White workers also exerted pressure on the government to oust Chinese from the country. While demands to deport all Chinese were unsuccessful, the United States Congress compromised with passage of the Chinese Exclusion Act in 1882.

== Immigration and naturalization policies: 1864–1929 ==
While immigrant contract labor was promoted by the United States government in 1864, laws were passed to prohibit contract labor. The Chinese Exclusion Act was passed in the 1880s to end Chinese immigration.

- 1864 Immigration Act — “An act to encourage Immigration.” Authorized the president to appoint a commissioner of immigration (reported to secretary of state); labor contracts entered into by immigrants prior to arrival in the United States were valid in all states and territories and might be enforced, providing no more than 12 months wages were required to repay costs of emigration; established the office of Superintendent of Immigration in New York.38th Congress, Session I, Chap. 246, July 4, 1864, p. 386,
- 1875 Page Law — “An act supplementary to the acts in relation to immigration.” United States consuls, or consuls general residing at ports of departure were responsible for ensuring Chinese, Japanese, and other Asian immigrants were not coerced into emigrating. Any citizen of the United States who attempted to transport them without their consent faced fines and imprisonment. Transporting women from Asian countries for the purpose of prostitution was forbidden and the ladies were refused entry; preexisting contracts for their labor were voided, and the persons responsible were subject to fines and imprisonment. The same penalties applied to anyone who transported Coolie labor. All ships were subject to inspection if there was any suspicion of illegal immigrants or undesirables on board the vessels. All illegal immigrants denied access had the right to contest their status in a court of law. Forty-third Congress, Session II, Chap. 141, March 3, 1875, 477.
- 1882 Chinese Exclusion Act — The act barred entry of Chinese laborers for 10 years and denied citizenship to those already living in the United States. Persons wishing to leave the United States temporarily had to register with the customs house nearest the point of imminent departure. Chinese diplomats, along with their families, domestic help, and office staff were exempt. Forty-seventh Congress, Session I, Chap. 126; 22 Stat. 58, May 6, 1882. This Act was extended in 1892, 1902, and 1904.
- 1882 Immigration Act — “An act to regulate immigration.” A 50-cent tax was to be levied on all aliens landing at United States ports. The State Commission and officers were responsible for examining passengers arriving in U.S. ports. Individuals thought to be convicts, mentally disabled, or indigent were not permitted to disembark. Forty-seventh Congress, Session I, Chap. 376; 22 Stat. 214, August 3, 1882.
- 1885 Alien Contract Labor Law — “An act to prohibit the importation and migration of foreigners and aliens under contract or agreement to perform labor in the United States, its territories, and the District of Columbia.” The 1885 Contract Labor Law prohibited American citizens or organizations from entering into labor contracts with individuals prior to their immigration to the United States and ship captains from transporting said immigrants. Forty-eighth Congress, Sess. II, Chap. 164; 23 Stat. 332, February 26, 1885. This law was amended on February 23, 1887, at which time the secretary of the treasury was given the power to exclude or deport contract laborers. It was amended once again on October 9, 1888 to give the secretary of the treasury the authority to deport within a year any immigrant who had arrived contrary to the 1885 law.
- 1903 Alien Act — “An Act to regulate the immigration of aliens into the United States.” A head-tax is instituted for all arriving passengers, whatever their mode of transportation, with the exception of citizens from the Canadian Dominion, or the Republics of Cuba and Mexico. The act forbade entry by individuals deported within the previous year for working as contract laborers; however, skilled contract laborers were allowed if there were no native workers possessing the appropriate skills to fill positions. Entertainers, religious ministers, professors and other professionals, and domestics were exempt.
- 1907 Immigration Act — Authorized the president to refuse admission to immigrants whose entry would have a deleterious effect on labor conditions in the United States; the main purpose of the act was to exclude Japanese laborers.
- 1907-1908 — “Gentlemen’s Agreement between the United States and Japanese government, which volunteers to stop emigration of laborers.”
- 1911 — United States Joint Immigration (Dillingham) Commission published a forty-two volume report in which it declared immigration was harming the nation and asked for limitation of immigrants from eastern and southern Europe.
- 1917 Immigration Act (Also known as the Asiatic Barred Zone Act) — Persons from “any country not owned by the U.S. adjacent to the continent of Asia” along certain latitudes and longitudes were prohibited from entering the United States. An eight-dollar head tax was imposed on immigrants over the age of 16 years as well as a literacy test; those seeking refuge from religious persecution were exempt.
- 1921, 1924, and 1929 — Immigrant quotas were established in 1921 and became more restrictive over the next eight years. Preference was given to immigrants from western and northern Europe.

== Notable padrones ==
- Luigi Fugazy – a prominent Italian padrone in New York City

== Bibliography ==
- Banfield, Alfred T. “The padrone, the sojourners, and the settlers: a preface to the 'little Italics' of Maine." Maine Historical Society Quarterly (1992) Vol. 31 Issue 3/4, pp 114–141.
- Calabrese, Victoria. "From Basilicata to New York City: Ending the Exploitation of Italian Fanciulli Girovaghi in the 1860s and 1870s." Italian American Review 15.2 (2025): 117-135.
- Fitzgerald, Patrick and Brian Lambkin. Migration in Irish History, 1607-2007. New York: Palgrave Macmillan, 2008.
- Gabaccia, Donna. "Neither Padrone Slaves nor Primitive Rebels: Sicilians on Two Continents." in Dirk Hoerder, ed., Struggle a Hard Battle": Essays on Working-Class Immigrants (1986) pp 113+
- Harney, Robert F. "The Padrone and the Immigrant," Canadian Review of American Studies (1974) 5#2 pp 101–118
- Nelli. Humbert S. "The Italian padrone system in the United States." Labor History 5.2 (1964): 153–167. https://doi.org/10.1080/00236566408583942
- Moquin, Wayne with Charles Van Doren, eds. A Documentary History of the Italian Americans. New York: Praeger Publishers, 1974.
- Peck, Gunther. "Divided loyalties: immigrant padrones and the evolution of industrial paternalism in North America." International Labor and Working-Class History 53 (1998): 49–68.
- Peck, Gunther Peck, Reinventing Free Labor: Padrones and Immigrant Workers in the North American West, 1880-1930, (Cambridge University Press, 2000), a major scholarly survey regarding Greeks, Italians and Mexicans in the western areas of US and Canada\
- Pozzetta, George E. " A Padrone Looks at Florida: Labor Recruiting and the Florida East Coast Railway," Florida Historical Quarterly 54#1 (1975) pp 74–84 online
- Romanato, Gianpaolo (2015). "Le molte vite di Adolfo Rossi: Emigrante, giornalista, ispettore, diplomático" [The Many Lives of Adolfo Rossi: Emigrant, Journalist, Inspector, Diplomat] (PDF). Zibaldone: Estudios italianos de La Torre del Virrey (in Italian). 3 (1): 111-121. ISSN 2255-3576.
- Rossi, Adolfo (1904). "Per la tutela degli italiani negli Stati Uniti. Lettere dell'ispettore cav. Adolfo Rossi, scritte al Commissariato dell'emigrazione nel corso di una sua missione negli Stati Uniti dell'America del Nord". Bollettino dell'emigrazione (in Italian) (16). Commissariato Generale dell'Emigrazione: 3–136.
- Thomas, Teresa Fava. "Arresting the Padroni problem and Rescuing the White Slaves in America: Italian Diplomats, Immigration Restrictionists & the Italian bureau 1881-1901." Altreitalia Riviste 192 Tesi 194 (2010) 40: 57–82. online
- Ueda, Reed. Postwar Immigrant America: A Social History. (Bedford Books of St. Martin's Press, 1994).

== Online sources ==
- Harvard University Open Collection Program. "The present aspect of the immigration problem." Immigration Restriction League (U.S.), 1894. Link label
- Harvard University - Widener Library, Abstracts of reports of the Immigration Commission :with conclusions and recommendations, and views of the minority (in two volumes). Washington : G.P.O., 1911.
- U.S. Immigration Legislation Online, ed. Sarah Starkweather, University of Washington-Bothell. (Last revised 2007) Link label
