= Our Lady of Pompeii Church (Manhattan) =

Catholic church in New York City

- Shrine Church of Our Lady of Pompeii
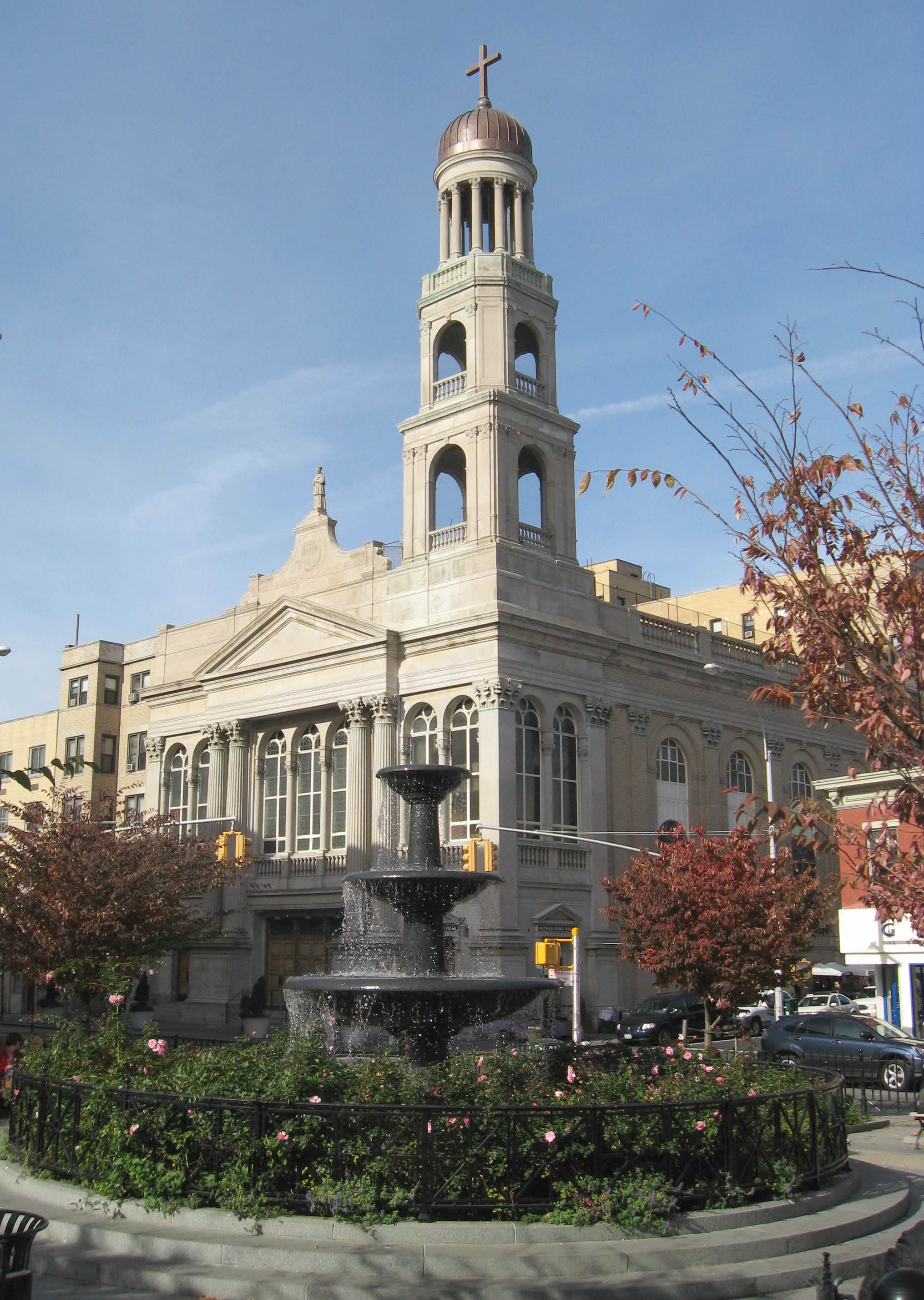
- The church viewed from the neighboring Father Demo Square in 2008

- Location within Lower Manhattan Location within New York City
- 40°43′50″N 74°0′10″W
- Location: South Village, New York City, United States
- Denomination: Catholic Church
- Religious institute: Scalabrini Fathers
- Website: olpnyc.org

History
- Status: Parish church, national parish, shrine
- Founded: 1892
- Founder: Pietro Bandini
- Dedication: Our Lady of the Rosary of Pompeii
- Dedicated: October 7, 1928

Architecture
- Architect(s): Matthew Del Gaudio; Antonio D'Ambrosio
- Style: Romanesque Revival
- Groundbreaking: 1926
- Completed: September 1928

Administration
- Archdiocese: Archdiocese of New York

Our Lady of Pompeii Church, or more formally, the Shrine Church of Our Lady of Pompeii, is a Catholic parish church located in the South Village neighborhood of Manhattan, New York City, in the United States. The church is staffed by Scalabrini Fathers, while the Our Lady of Pompeii School is staffed by Apostles of the Sacred Heart of Jesus. It is located across from Father Demo Square, which is named for the church's third pastor, Antonio Demo.

The church was founded in 1892 as a national parish to serve Italian-American immigrants who settled in Greenwich Village, eventually becoming the American counterpart to the Shrine of Our Lady of the Rosary of Pompei in Italy and a shrine in its own right. The church has resided at its present location since 1926, when construction on its current edifice began. While it has remained a largely Italian American parish, the church has come to incorporate many other immigrant groups.

== History ==
=== Origins ===
The parish of Our Lady of Pompeii was founded in 1892. The origins of the parish lie in the arrival of Father Pietro Bandini, an Italian Jesuit priest, in New York City in 1890. His purpose was to establish a chapter of the Saint Raphael Society for the Protection of Italian Immigrants, an organization that sought to defend Italian immigrants from usury and labor exploitation. Bandini purchased a building at 113 Waverly Place to use its first-floor storefront as a chapel for the Society. He named it the Our Lady of Pompeii chapel, in honor of the Virgin Mary under her title of Our Lady of the Rosary of Pompeii. The first Mass was said in the chapel on May 8, 1892. In addition to his spiritual ministry, Bandini assisted new immigrants with legal matters, assimilating to the United States, and finding work.

The chapel was established within the territorial parish boundaries of St. Joseph's Church, whose pastor was Fr. Denis O'Flynn. He vehemently protested the establishment of another church near his, several having already been erected, that might draw parishioners away from his congregation. However, he also refused to allow Italians admittance to his church, which was mostly Irish in composition. To allay O'Flynn's fears of poaching parishioners, Bandini posted a notice on the entrance to his chapel that it was to serve only Italian Catholics. O'Flynn, nonetheless, accused Bandini of stealing parishioners before the archdiocese's chancery office within three months of the chapel's establishment.

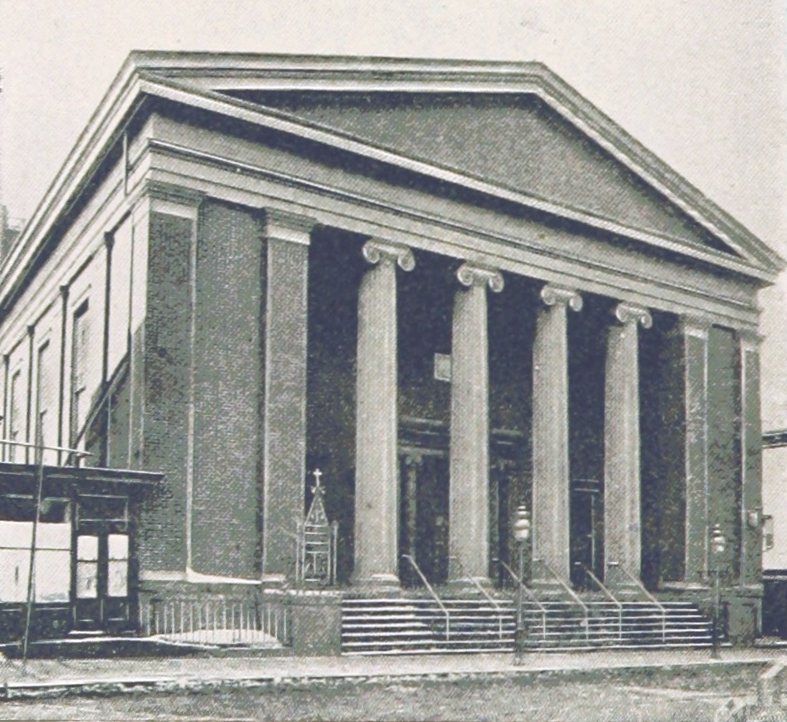
210 Bleecker Street in 1893, which the church occupied from 1898 to 1928

Many immigrants who arrived from the northwestern Italian town of Chiavari to settle in Greenwich Village attended Our Lady of Pompeii chapel. Bandini requested that the community be elevated to the status of a parish in the Archdiocese of New York. The location of the church changed in 1895 when Bandini began renting a building at 214 Sullivan Street. It had originally been built in 1810 for an African American Baptist church and had more recently housed the Bethel Methodist Colored Church. Archbishop Michael Corrigan officially declared the community a parish in 1895. Rather than a territorial parish, Our Lady of Pompeii was a national parish, which served an ethnicity, namely Italians, rather than a geographic population. In this capacity, it became the second national parish in New York City for Italians, following St. Anthony of Padua Church. In 1896, Bandini left the church for Sunnyside Plantation in Arkansas to minister to the Italian workers there, and went on with the workers to found the city of Tontitown. Upon his departure, several unidentified priests impressed upon Archbishop Corrigan that he should close down the parish, but he decided against it.

Bandini was succeeded as pastor of the church by Father Francesco Zaboglio in 1896, who held the role for only a year. In 1897, he was badly injured in a gas explosion in the church basement, which killed two other men employed by the parish and damaged the church building. With Zaboglio's retirement and return to Italy, Father Antonio Demo, a man prominent in the Italian-American community became the next pastor; he would serve in this position until 1935. While at the time of its founding, more than 80 percent of the church's parishioners hailed from Northern Italy, many of whom came specifically from the region of Liguria, by 1898 Southern Italians constituted a plurality of the congregation. On March 7, 1898, the parish of Our Lady of Pompeii was legally incorporated.

The church on Sullivan Street was subsequently destroyed by fire, and the congregation relocated to a Greek Revival building at 210 Bleecker Street on May 8, 1898. The building had been originally commissioned in 1836 by a Unitarian Universalist church. Since 1883 it had been occupied by St. Benedict the Moor Catholic Church whose African American parish was moving north in Manhattan. Around this time, the parish received permission from Bartolo Longo, the founder of the Shrine of Our Lady of the Rosary of Pomepi in Italy, to promote itself as the American shrine to Our Lady of the Rosary of Pompeii. There is some indication that by around 1899 tension had begun to build between Our Lady of Pompeii and St. Anthony of Padua Church. While the latter was the older of the two Italian national parishes in the area, the Italians took a liking to the Scalabrinians over the Franciscans (who ran St. Anthony's). For this reason, Our Lady of Pompeii's membership equaled that of St. Anthony of Padua within ten years of the former's founding.

The parish was impacted by the Triangle Shirtwaist Factory fire in 1911, which took place nearby. Father Demo was active in consoling the mourning families. By 1917, the number of parishioners had grown to more than 20,000. For a time, Mother Cabrini taught at Our Lady of Pompeii.

=== Present church ===
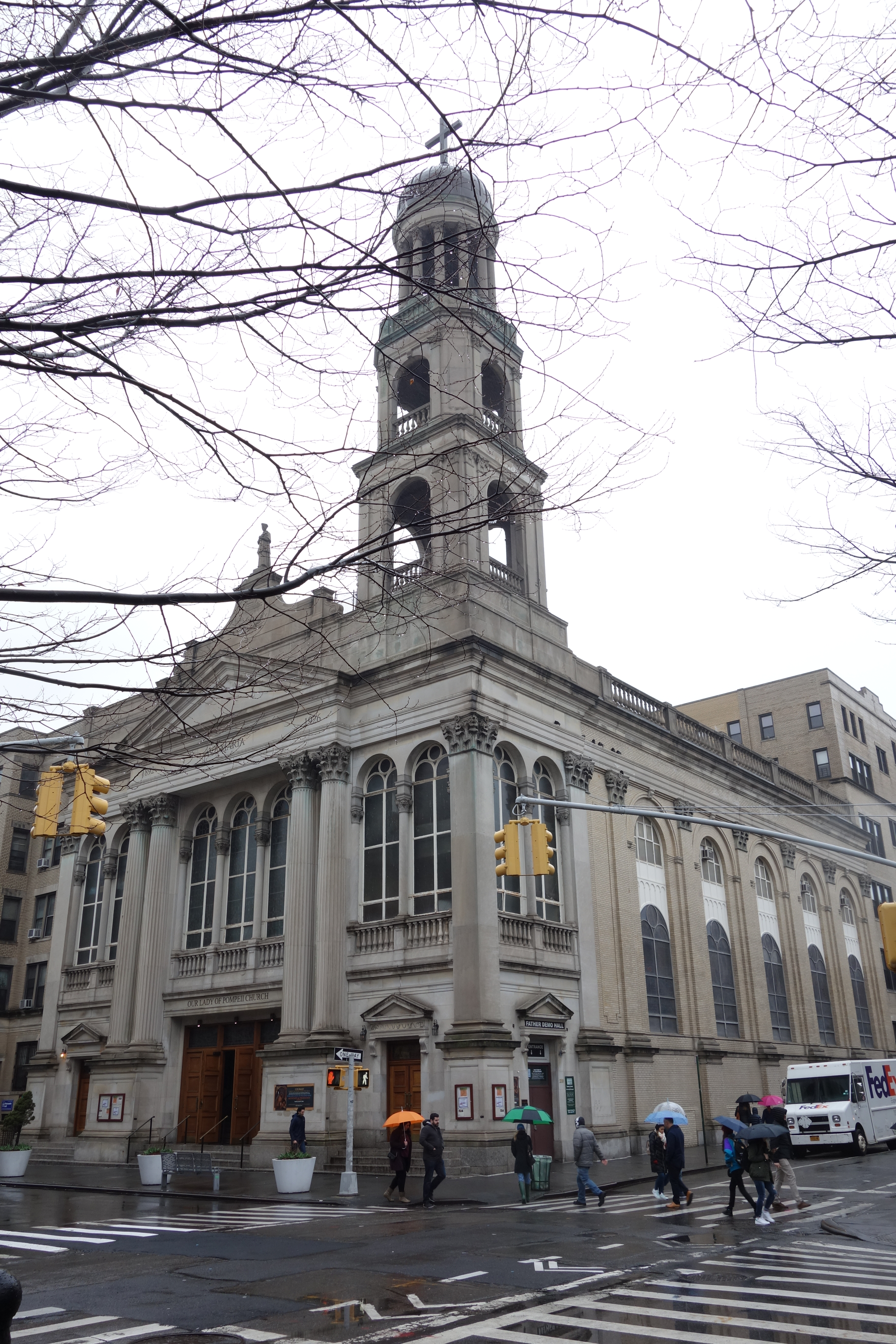
Church at the intersection of Carmine and Bleecker Streets on an overcast day in 2018

In 1923, the City of New York decided to extend Sixth Avenue southward through the area occupied by the church and several dozen other buildings. Using eminent domain, the city seized, condemned, and eventually demolished the structures. Before demolition, Demo formed committees of parishioners to organize moving the parish to a new location. The pastor and the committees began purchasing land on the corner of Bleecker Street, eventually acquiring house numbers 17 through 25. There, they built a new church building, a rectory that opened in 1928, a parochial school that opened in 1930 staffed by the Missionary Zelatrices of the Sacred Heart of Jesus, and a convent that opened in the 1950s. Father Demo personally selected Matthew W. Del Gaudio to be the architect of the church.

The existing buildings on the land were cleared, and ground was broken for the new church in 1926. On New Year's Day 1928, during construction, a 3-year-old girl named Zita Triglia was killed when a 10-foot-long beam fell from the belfry scaffolding, knocking her from her father's arms. The church was completed in September of that year. It was dedicated on October 7, 1928, the feast day of Our Lady of the Rosary, in a solemn mass said by Cardinal Patrick Hayes with more than 2,000 worshipers in attendance.

Father Demo was recalled to Rome in 1933 and died three years later; in his stead, John Marchegiani served as acting pastor and then pastor, and eventually as procurator. In 1933 American-born Italians represented a majority of the parish for the first time. When Marchegiani was recalled to Rome in 1937, he was succeeded by Ugo Cavicchi. He advanced the school, decorated the interior of the church, and welcomed the Society of Saint Vincent de Paul, which assisted the poor and taught hundreds of Italian immigrants to take the American citizenship exam. During Father Mario Albanesi's pastorship from 1952 to 1964, the church property expanded with the purchase of houses on Carmine and Leroy Streets.

Today, the church stands at 25 Carmine Street, at the northern corner of the intersection with Bleecker Street. It is directly across from Father Demo Square, which is located on the eastern corner of Carmine and Bleecker Streets. The church is staffed by priests who are Missionaries of St. Charles Borromeo (Scalabrini Fathers) and the school is staffed by sisters of the Apostles of the Sacred Heart of Jesus. While the church was founded for Italian immigrants and remained a parish primarily for Italian Americans for most of its history, in recent times its parishioners have included a range of immigrant groups. This is reflected by the fact that Mass is offered in English, Italian, Spanish, Portuguese, and Tagalog. Since its second expansion in 2010, Our Lady of Pompeii Church has been located within the Greenwich Village Historic District.

== Architecture ==
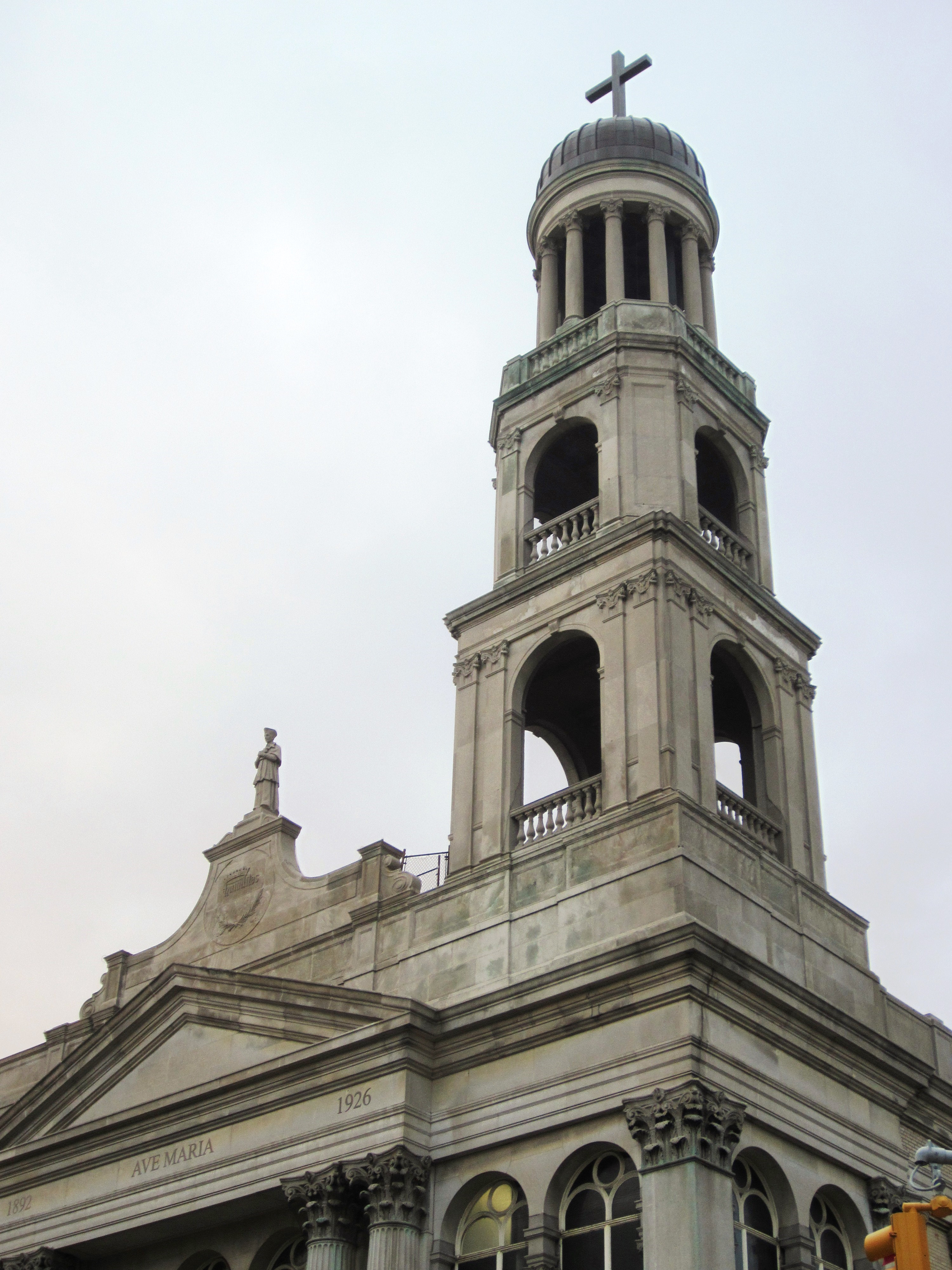
Closeup of the campanile

Del Gaudio's façade facing Carmine Street is built of limestone, while beige brick faces Bleecker Street. In total, the edifice cost over $1 million to construct, equivalent to $18.8 million in 2025. On the exterior of the Romanesque Revival church, the building is accented by large Corinthian columns supporting a closed pediment over the entrance and a balustrade along the roofline. The façade is topped with an asymmetrically placed, three-story campanile enclosed by a copper dome and a finial cross. Inside this campanile, a new carillon was installed in 1988. It was Del Gaudio's intention to draw from the Romanesque style common to parishioners' homes and churches in Italy. For this reason he included shallow front steps, a flat façade that was close to the street, the domed sanctuary, and a campanile on the church, modeled after that of the Shrine of Our Lady of the Rosary of Pompei. On the roofline is a pediment topped by an acroterion statue of St. Charles Borromeo.

=== Interior furnishings ===
The interior of the church was decorated in the Romanesque Revival style, between 1934 and 1937, by Antonio D'Ambrosio, the founder of D'Ambrosio Ecclesiastical Art Studios. The nave is lined with polished marble Corinthian columns, above which is a frieze bearing a Latin inscription of the Hail Mary in golden letters. Above the frieze, within the barrel vault of the ceiling, are painted depictions of the Joyful Mysteries of the Rosary on the right side of the nave, and depictions of the Sorrowful Mysteries on the left side. On the ceiling are depictions of the Glorious Mysteries.

The marble reredos contains a painting that is an exact replica of one in the Shrine of Our Lady in Pompei. It was given to the church in 1895 as a gift by Annie Leary. The painting is situated within a Romanesque arch and depicts the Virgin Mary holding the child Jesus who is handing a rosary to St. Dominic, while his mother hands a rosary to St. Catherine of Siena. This painting originally adorned the church's 210 Bleecker Street building and was cut and moved to its present location with the construction of the church. It was before this painting that many Italian emigrant parishioners would pray for safe travels before voyaging back to Naples or pray in thanksgiving upon returning to America.

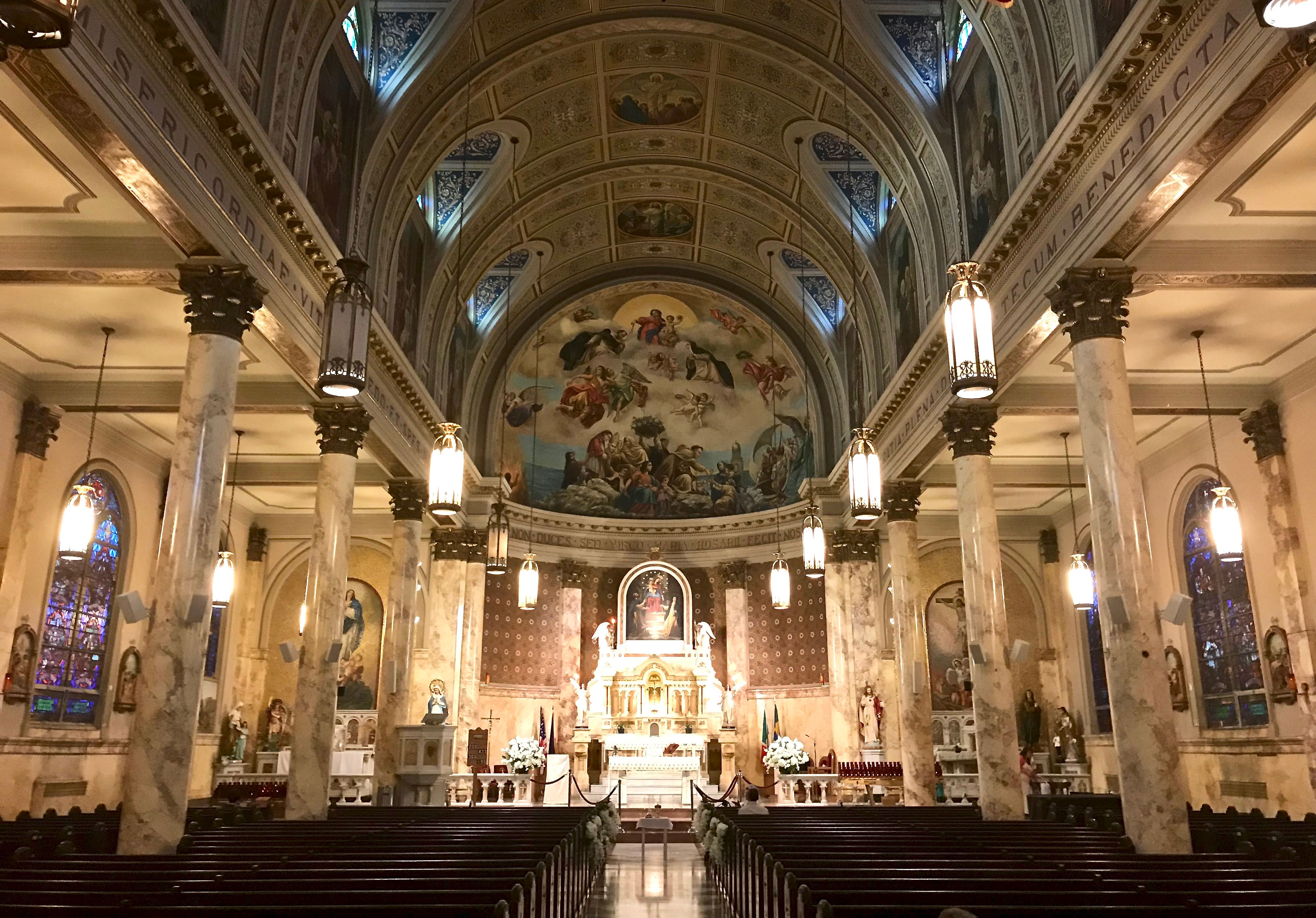
Interior of the church in 2018

To the left of the mural in the apsidal dome is a depiction of the Church Penitent, represented by souls in purgatory awaiting salvation. To the right is a depiction of the Church Triumphant, specifically the saints in heaven. Beneath the mural in the apse is another frieze that bears the Latin inscription:

NON ARMA · NON DUCES · SED VIRGO MARIA ROSARII FECIT NOS VICTORES
(Neither arms nor leaders, but the Virgin Mary of the Rosary made us victors)

The largest painted accent in the interior is the mural in the semi-dome above the altar, which was created in 1937 and illustrates the Church Militant. The mural depicts the Virgin Mary and Jesus as a child in her lap, as she stands on a cloud, in front of the Sun. Mary is presenting St. Dominic, who is holding and contemplating the cross, with a rosary. St. Catherine of Siena looks on from the distance, as angels fly about them. The lower right corner of the mural, against a background of sky and sea, depicts a galleon in the naval Battle of Lepanto on October 7, 1571. The miraculous Spanish victory was attributed to divine intercession in response to prayer to Our Lady of the Rosary. One of the angels is handing a rosary to a soldier, which is depicted as the decisive weapon in the battle. Imagery of the Shrine of Our lady of the Rosary in Pompei, Italy is present above the battle, including the shrine's campanile. The religious are tending to poor immigrants, and a woman receives a rosary from a Franciscan friar, symbolizing that the Franciscans from St. Anthony of Padua Church were the first ministers to the Italian immigrants in New York. The mural also depicts St. Charles Borromeo in red, who is the patron saint of the Scalabrinians, and Saint Giovanni Battista Scalabrini, their founder, as a bishop in white, their founder. Also visible is St. Martin de Porres holding a basket of roses, acknowledging the African American community that worshiped at Our Lady of Pompeii's previous church. This mural was removed in the 1970s, and replaced with less dramatic imagery consistent with the persuasion of the Second Vatican Council. It was later recreated by Antonio D'Ambrosio's son, Anthony D'Ambrosio, based on his father's original drawings.

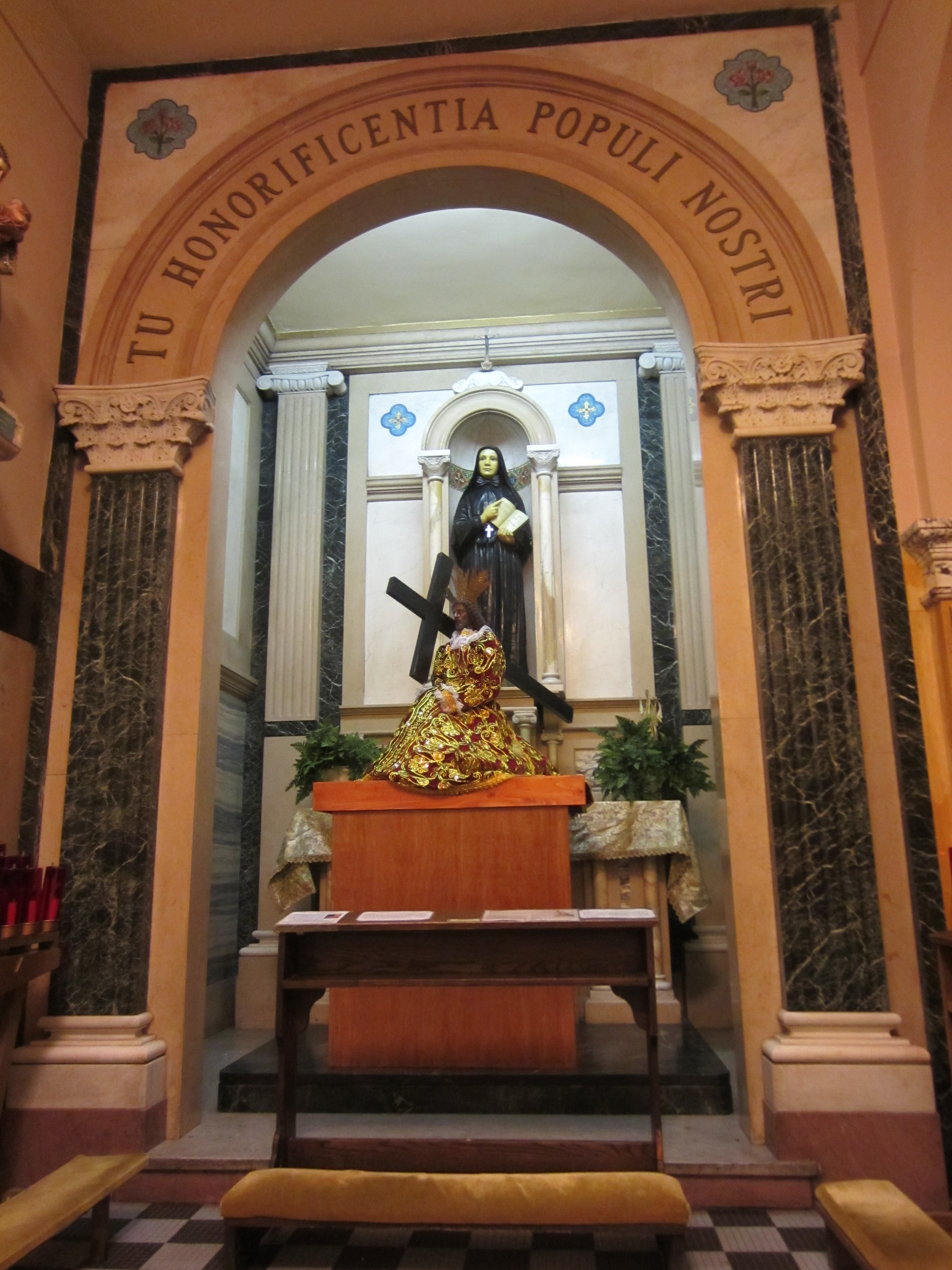
Shrine to Mother Cabrini and Jesus Nazareno

Work on the stained glass windows that enclose either aisle began in 1928 and continued into the 1940s. They show scenes from the lives of the saints, the catechism, and the Gospel; in particular, the saints are shown in such a way that illustrates each of the Beatitudes with which they are associated. Individuals depicted in the windows include: St. Stephen, St. Catherine of Siena, St. John the Baptist, St. Peter, St. Paul, the Four Evangelists, and Pope Leo XIII with Mother Cabrini. Additional stained glass windows were added over the narthex in 1986. They depict the Exodus from Egypt, the Holy Family, Christopher Columbus giving thanks for reaching America, and Ellis Island, symbolizing the parish's immigrant and Italian heritage.

In addition to architectural furnishings, the interior also contains a significant amount of statuary. To one side of the entrance is a shrine to Mother Cabrini, the patroness saint of immigrants, and a statue of Jesus Nazareno, which is revered by Filipino pilgrims to the Pompei shrine in Italy. Additionally, there is a statue of San Gaetano that was gifted by devotees, a statue of Saint Jude that was bequeathed in 1955, a bust of Giovanni Scalabrini from 1955, and statues of St. Rose of Lima, St. Lucy, and Padre Pio. There is also a statue of St. Gerard that had resided in the maternity ward of St. Vincent's Hospital and was given as a gift by the Sisters of Charity upon the hospital's closing. The oldest statues in the church are those of the Blessed Mother and St. John the Evangelist, which date to the 1880s. The statues of St. Joseph and the Sacred Heart date to at least as early as 1909.

The pipe organ at the rear of the church, designed by George Kilgen & Son, was installed at the time the church was built, incorporating many old pipes that may have been taken from the 1918 organ of the previous church at 214 Bleecker Street. It was expanded over the years, at one point incorporating pipes from a 1928 organ in the Immaculate Conception Church in Trenton, New Jersey.

== Pastors ==
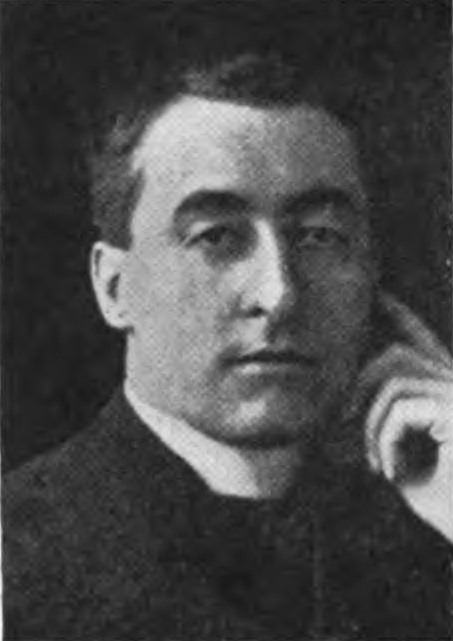
Father Antonio Demo was an influential pastor of the church

The following priests, in chronological order, served as pastor of the church:

- Pietro Bandini, S.J. (1892–1896)
- Francesco Zaboglio (1896–1897)
- Antonio Demo, C.S. (1897–1935)
- John Marchegiani (1935–1937)
- Ugo Cavicchi (1937–1946)
- Joseph Bernardi (1946–1952)
- Mario Albanesi (1952–1964)
- Anthony Del Bacon (1964–1967)
- Guido Caverzan (1967–1970)
- James Abbarno (1970–1975)
- Edward Marino (1975–1980)
- Charles Zanoni (1980–1989)
- Tarcisius Bagatin (1989–1993)
- Ralph Bove, C.S. (1993–unknown)
- John Massari, C.S. (unknown–2013)
- Walter Tonelotto, C.S. (2013–present)

== See also ==
- Anti-Italianism
- Catholic Church in the United States
- History of New York City (1898–1945)
- Italian Americans in New York City
