= South Village =

Neighborhood of Manhattan in New York City

- South Village Historic District
- U.S. National Register of Historic Places
- U.S. Historic district
- New York State Register of Historic Places
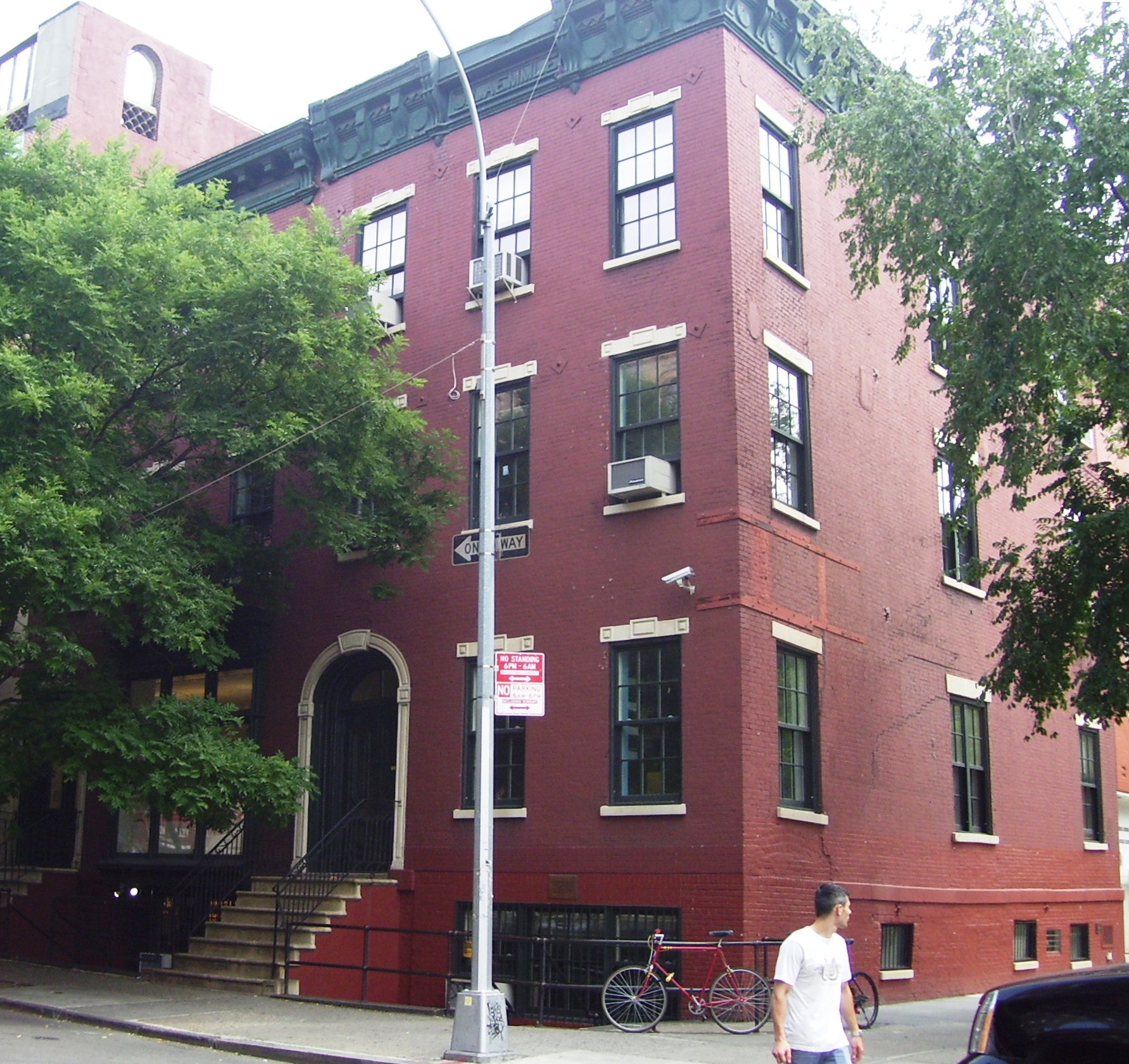
- 200 Bleecker Street, part of the Little Red School House in the South Village

- Location within Manhattan Location within New York City Location within New York
- Location: Roughly Bedford, Carmine, Downing, Grand, Jones, Leroy, MacDougal, Prince, W. 3rd Sts., Manhattan, New York
- Coordinates: 40°43′45″N 74°0′3″W
- Area: 74.9 acres (30.3 ha)
- NRHP reference No.: 14000026

Significant dates
- Added to NRHP: February 24, 2014
- Designated NYSRHP: December 24, 2013

The South Village is a largely residential area that is part of the larger Greenwich Village in Lower Manhattan, New York City, directly below Washington Square Park. Known for its immigrant heritage and bohemian history, the architecture of the South Village is primarily tenement-style apartment buildings, indicative of the area's history as an enclave for Italian-American immigrants and working-class residents of New York.

The South Village is roughly bounded by West 4th Street and Washington Square Park on the north, Seventh Avenue South and Varick Street on the west, Canal Street on the south, and West Broadway and LaGuardia Place on the east. West Broadway separates the predominantly residential South Village from SoHo, dominated by factory and loft buildings, to the east.

The South Village includes the Charlton–King–Vandam Historic District, the MacDougal–Sullivan Gardens Historic District, and the Sullivan–Thompson Historic District.

== History ==
Originally home to a merchant class in the early 19th century, by the late 19th century the area was dominated by immigrants, largely from Italy. The Italian immigrants built their own distinct parishes, to distinguish them not only from their Protestant neighbors on the north side of Washington Square Park (in Greenwich Village), but their Irish neighbors in the South Village. By the late 19th century, Italians outnumbered the Irish in the area, but were not preeminent in the local church hierarchy, especially the parish of St. Patrick's, which covered this area. In response, the Italian-American communities of the South Village built Our Lady of Pompeii and St. Anthony of Padua churches, which remain the area's defining religious edifices. The Italian-American community was very poor, and its parish churches often had to be subsidized by third parties; Our Lady of Pompeii Church was the personal charity of a woman named Annie Leary who is buried in the crypt of Old St. Patrick's Cathedral.

By the 1920s, however – the Village having fallen out of fashion with New York's patricians – artists, bohemians, and radical thinkers began to populate the area, and the institutions which served them, such as jazz clubs and speakeasies became commonplace throughout the area. By the 1950s and 1960s, many of these had become coffeehouses and folk clubs for hippies, beatniks, and artists. These South Village establishments were frequented by some of the most significant players in these cultural movements, including Bob Dylan, Jack Kerouac, James Agee, Miles Davis, John Coltrane, Sam Shepard and Jackson Pollock.

== Preservation ==
The South Village was left out of the Greenwich Village Historic District designated by the New York City Landmarks Preservation Commission (LPC) in 1969, though Village activists had pushed to include much of it. Perhaps because much of the significant history of the area was relatively recent, associated with the Beats, the Folk Revival, and modern American Theater and progressive education – and because the architecture was more reflective of the Village's late 19th- and early 20th-century working-class, immigrant evolution, rather than its 19th-century patrician origins – the area was sidestepped for inclusion in the historic district. There was much speculation that New York University, located on its edges and in its midst, may have also played a role in the area's exclusion.

Two small sections of the area were designated early on by the LPC, however, as well as being listed on the New York State and National Registers of Historic Places: the Charlton-King-Vandam Historic District in 1966, and the MacDougal-Sullivan Gardens Historic District in 1967. Several buildings also were individually landmarked, including Judson Memorial Church; 26, 28, and 30 Jones Street; 203 Prince Street; and 83, 85, and 116 Sullivan Street.

The neighborhood remained relatively free of demolitions and out-of-scale new development until the 1980s, when New York University (NYU) erected the high-rise D'Agostino Hall on West Third Street. The pace of change quickened in the late 1990s and early 2000s with the demolition of the historic Poe House and Judson Houses on West Third Street by NYU to make way for the new Furman Hall Law School Building. The relatively modest, mid-century modern NYU Skirball Student Center on Washington Square South also was demolished to make way for the considerably larger and more prominent NYU Kimmel Student Center, which was criticized for blocking the view downtown through Washington Square Arch. This increased calls for landmark and zoning protections for the South Village, which became a campaign led by the Greenwich Village Society for Historic Preservation (GVSHP).

=== Renewing the call ===
The GVSHP researched the history of every one of approximately 750 buildings in the 25-block area and commissioned noted architectural historian Andrew Dolkart to write a history of the area to buttress GVSHP's proposal for a South Village Historic District. The report, research, and landmarking proposal were submitted to the LPC in December 2006.

The LPC divided the proposed district into three sections, promising to consider only one at a time. While the Commission considered the proposal, several key buildings were lost, including the Tunnel Garage, an early Art Deco building; the Provincetown Playhouse and Apartments, demolished by NYU to make way for another Law School building; the Circle in the Square Theater, the first non-profit theater; an 1861 rowhouse at 178 Bleecker Street; and 186 Spring Street, an 1824 rowhouse which gay activists and GVSHP rallied to save because it served as the home to some of the most important and influential figures in the post-Stonewall LGBT rights movement.

The first phase of GVSHP's proposed South Village Historic District, covering approximately 11 blocks and 235 buildings west of Sixth Avenue, were landmarked in 2010, officially designated the "Greenwich Village Historic District Extension II" – or more informally, the "South Village Extension" of the Greenwich Village Historic District.

After this, the LPC stalled on the two remaining phases of the proposed South Village Historic District, in spite of promises to move ahead. In 2012, developer Trinity Real Estate applied for a rezoning of the adjacent Hudson Square area, which would require the approval of both the NYC Planning Commission and City Council. The proposed rezoning would have allowed high-rise residential development in the manufacturing district directly bordering the South Village, which according to the developer's own draft environmental impact statement, would have had a "direct adverse impact" upon the remaining, un-landmarked part of the proposed South Village Historic District. In its part of the environmental review for the proposed Hudson Square rezoning (which included an examination of all potential historic resources within a 400-foot radius of the proposed rezoning), the LPC also acknowledged that the remaining un-landmarked portion of the proposed South Village Historic District was "landmark-eligible".

=== Rezoning politics ===
The Greenwich Village Society for Historic Preservation used this potential harm to spearhead a campaign to insist that the City Council not approve the Hudson Square Rezoning unless the proposed South Village Historic District was also approved. This put pressure on City Council Speaker Christine Quinn, who represented the area. Quinn had long claimed to support designation of the proposed South Village Historic District, but had not exerted any political pressure to get the city to act. GVSHP waged a letter-writing campaign, took out ads in local papers, and published op-eds demanding that Quinn vote down the rezoning unless she was also able to get the city to move ahead with the long-delayed South Village Historic District.

The strategy partly paid off. On March 13, 2013, the City Council announced an agreement by the city to move ahead before year's end with Phase II of GVSHP's proposed South Village Historic District – the area east of Sixth Avenue and north of Houston Street, as well as to survey Phase III – the area south of Houston Street. While GVSHP and other advocates claimed victory, they pointed out the shortcomings in the Quinn-brokered deal: the landmarking would not take effect until months after the rezoning, which was to be voted on that spring; the deal only included a commitment to survey Phase III, with no assurances about the outcome of the survey; and even the Phase II commitment was nebulous, in that no boundaries for the proposed district were offered, and the commitment of "a vote" by year's end did not guarantee passage.

When the LPC announced its proposed boundaries for Phase II – to be called "The South Village Historic District" – in April 2013, several key sites were excluded from the district, including two NYU properties, the Kevorkian Center and Vanderbilt Hall, the latter of which occupied a full block on Washington Square South and could have, under existing zoning and without landmark protections, been replaced with a 300 feet (91 m)-tall dorm. GVSHP called for the proposed district to be expanded to include the two NYU sites and a row of ten altered 1840s houses on West Houston Street, and began a campaign to convince Speaker Quinn, who brokered the deal, to pressure the LPC to bring these sites into the proposed district.

The strategy again worked, and the LPC and Quinn announced in May that the three sites, along with another NYU building, D'Agostino Hall, which was surrounded by the other sites, would be formally added into the proposed district for consideration. At the time of the scheduled vote in December 2013, the LPC could vote to exclude any site from the district or deny landmark status to the entire proposed district. By that time Quinn, who was running for mayor and thus sensitive to pressure, would be past her election bid.

=== Designation ===
The LPC voted to designate the South Village Historic District on December 17, 2013. From the beginning, the LPC expressed skepticism of the landmark-worthiness of the row of ten houses on West Houston Street, and they did in fact exclude those houses. However, in a victory for GVSHP and other advocates of the landmark campaign, LPC designated more than 250 buildings on more than a dozen blocks in the South Village, including the NYU buildings – even the full-block Vanderbilt Hall with its potential for replacement by a 300-foot (91 m)-tall dorm.

At the end of December, LPC Chairman Robert B. Tierney wrote to GVSHP saying that the commission's survey found the third phase of the proposed South Village Historic District was unworthy of landmark designation, and therefore the LPC would not be moving ahead with consideration of it. However, with a new Mayor taking office in January 2014, Bill de Blasio, Tierney was replaced. GVSHP and advocates are continuing the campaign to landmark the entire South Village, including the Phase III area south of Houston Street.

In December 2013, GVSHP's nomination of the entire South Village to the State and National Registers of Historic Places was accepted, and the South Village was formally listed in the State and National Registers of Historic Places in the spring of 2014.

The LPC held a public hearing on Phase III – which it referred to as the "Sullivan-Thompson Historic District" – in late November 2016, which provoked a "spirited debate". Politicians such as Manhattan Borough President Gale Brewer, New York State Assemblyperson Deborah Glick, and City Council member Corey Johnson, had voiced their support for the project, and Johnson has attempted to use his support for the proposed district as leverage for the rezoning and redevelopment of St. John's Terminal at 550 Washington Street, using air rights from the city-owned Pier 40. The proposed five-building complex would have a hotel, 400,000 square feet (37,000 m^{2}) of retail space, and more than 1,500 apartments.

Organizations that spoke in favor of the historic district included the GVSHP, the New York Landmarks Conservancy – whose representative, Gale Umberger, said "This district is part of the narrative of New York City" – and the Historic Districts Council, whose representative said that the proposed district "most notably demonstrates New York City's evolution of housing development spanning two centuries". Concerns were expressed about the Trump SoHo, which was said to be out of character for the neighborhood, and the recent real estate purchases in the area by Jared Kushner, Donald Trump's son-in-law.

Others, such as Joseph Rosenberg of the Catholic Community Relations Council, said that the landmarking of Phase III would put an undue burden on St. Anthony of Padua Church and the work it does for the immigrant community, and some residents complained that landmarking would make the upkeep of their buildings more difficult and expensive, with one remarking "Landmarking our block will force us to sell our building as we'll no longer be able to afford to maintain it. You will have created a museum but destroyed a community."

On December 13, 2016, the LPC voted to create the Sullivan-Thompson Historic District.

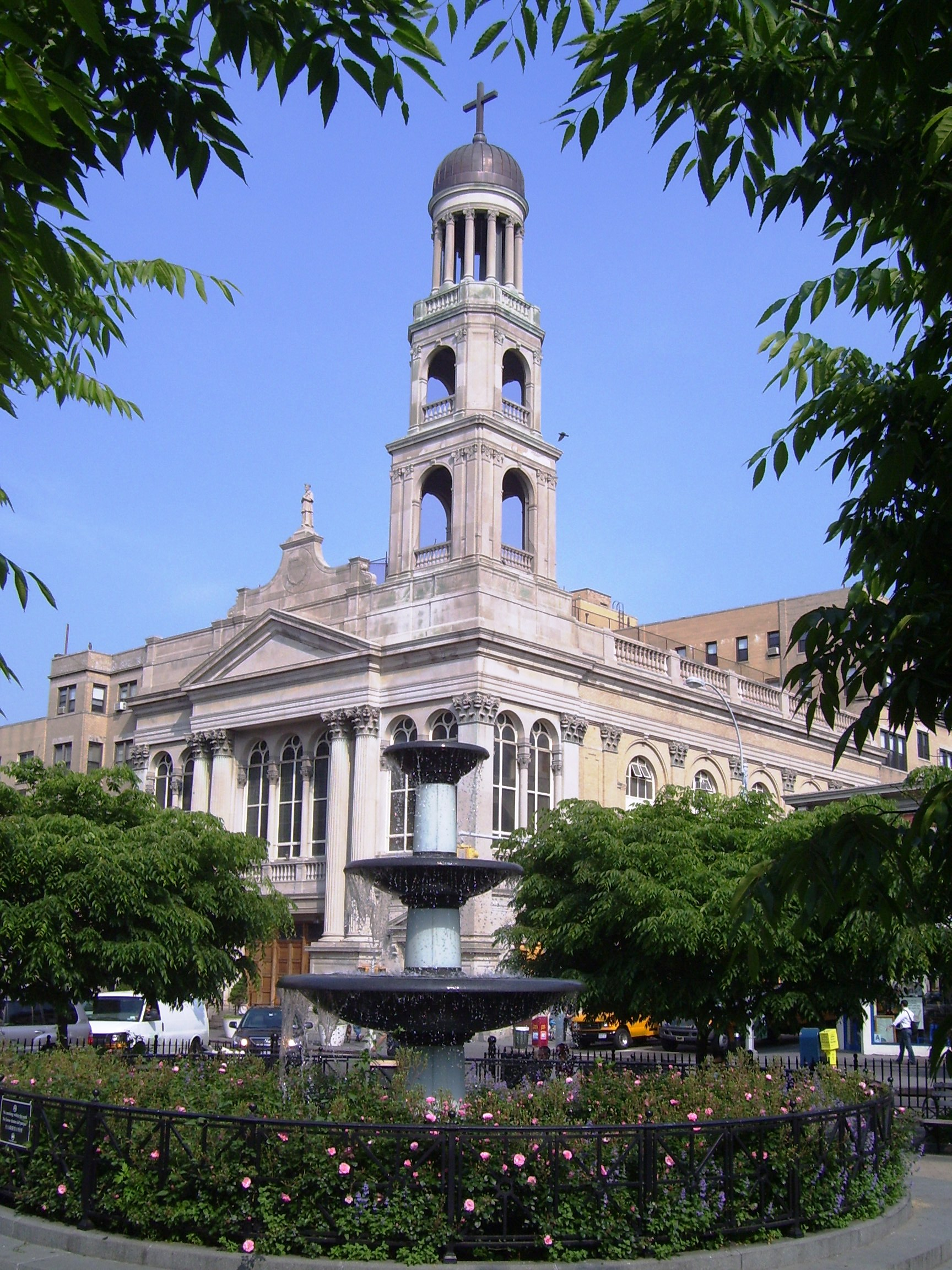
Our Lady of Pompeii Church seen through Father Demo Square

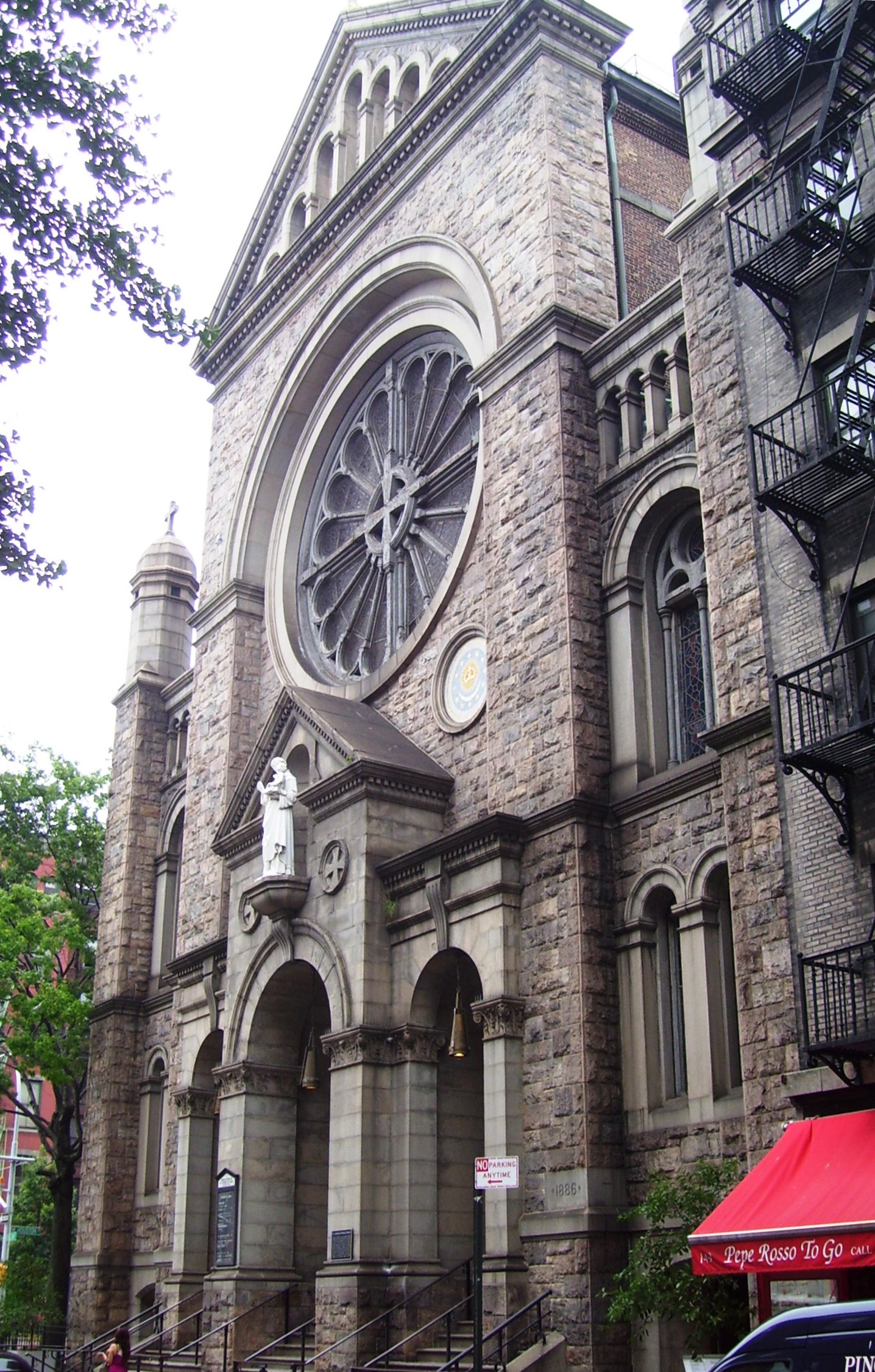
St. Anthony of Padua Church on Sullivan Street between Prince and Houston Streets

== Sites and attractions ==
- Father Demo Square
- Our Lady of Pompeii Church
- Greenwich House
- Provincetown Playhouse
- Comedy Cellar
- The Bitter End
- Caffe Cino

== Transportation ==
New York City Subway service is located at:

- West Fourth Street – Washington Square at Sixth Avenue; serving the A, B, C, D, E, F, <F>, and M trains
- Spring Street at Sixth Avenue; serving the A, C, and E trains
- Canal Street at Sixth Avenue; serving the A, C, and E trains

New York City Bus routes in the area include M55, M20, M21.

== See also ==
- Greenwich Village
- Hudson Square
- Italian American
- Greenwich Village Society for Historic Preservation
