= List of closed churches in the Roman Catholic Archdiocese of New York =

The following churches were once parishes or missions in the Archdiocese of New York that have been closed for some reasons such as financial constraints or lack of personnel.

For a listing of current parishes in the archdiocese, please visit List of churches in the Roman Catholic Archdiocese of New York.

== Churches in New York City ==
=== Churches in Staten Island ===
- Old Church of St. Joachim and St. Anne (Staten Island, New York), Hylan Boulevard, between Sharrott and Richmond Aves
- St. Benedicta, West Brighton – established 1922, merged with Our Lady of Mt. Carmel 1957.
- St. Mary of the Assumption, Port Richmond – established in 1877, merged with Our Lady of Mt. Carmel August 2015. Our Lady of the Assumption deconsecrated November 2017.

=== Churches in Manhattan ===
- Chapel of SS. Faith, Hope & Charity (Park Ave. at 58th St.) – established in 1958 and closed in 1986; formerly located at Park Ave. at 59th St. (1958–1978).
- Chapel of St. Teresa of Jesus (187th St. at Broadway) – established in 1932 and closed in 1935; formerly a mission of Our Lady of the Miraculous Medal.
- Church of Our Lady of Guadalupe (14th Street and Seventh Avenue) – established in 1913 as the first parish to serve the Spanish-Speaking; formerly staffed by the Augustinians of the Assumption. Merged with St. Bernard Parish in 2003.
- Church of Our Lady of the Miraculous Medal (114th St. at Seventh Ave.) – established in 1927 to serve the Spanish-speaking; formerly staffed by the Vincentian Fathers of Spain.
- Church of Our Lady of the Scapular (28th St. at First Ave.) – established in 1889; previously staffed by the Carmelite Friars. Merged with St. Stephen the Martyr parish. Was the original location of the National Shrine of Our Lady of Mount Carmel (est. 1941 and which was moved to Middletown
- Church of Our Lady Queen of Angels (113th St.) – established in 1886 and closed in 2007; formerly staffed by the Capuchin Friars.
- Church of Our Lady of Vilnius (Broome St.) – Founded in 1917 as a Lithuanian National Parish; closed in 2007. Records housed at St. Anthony Shrine Church.

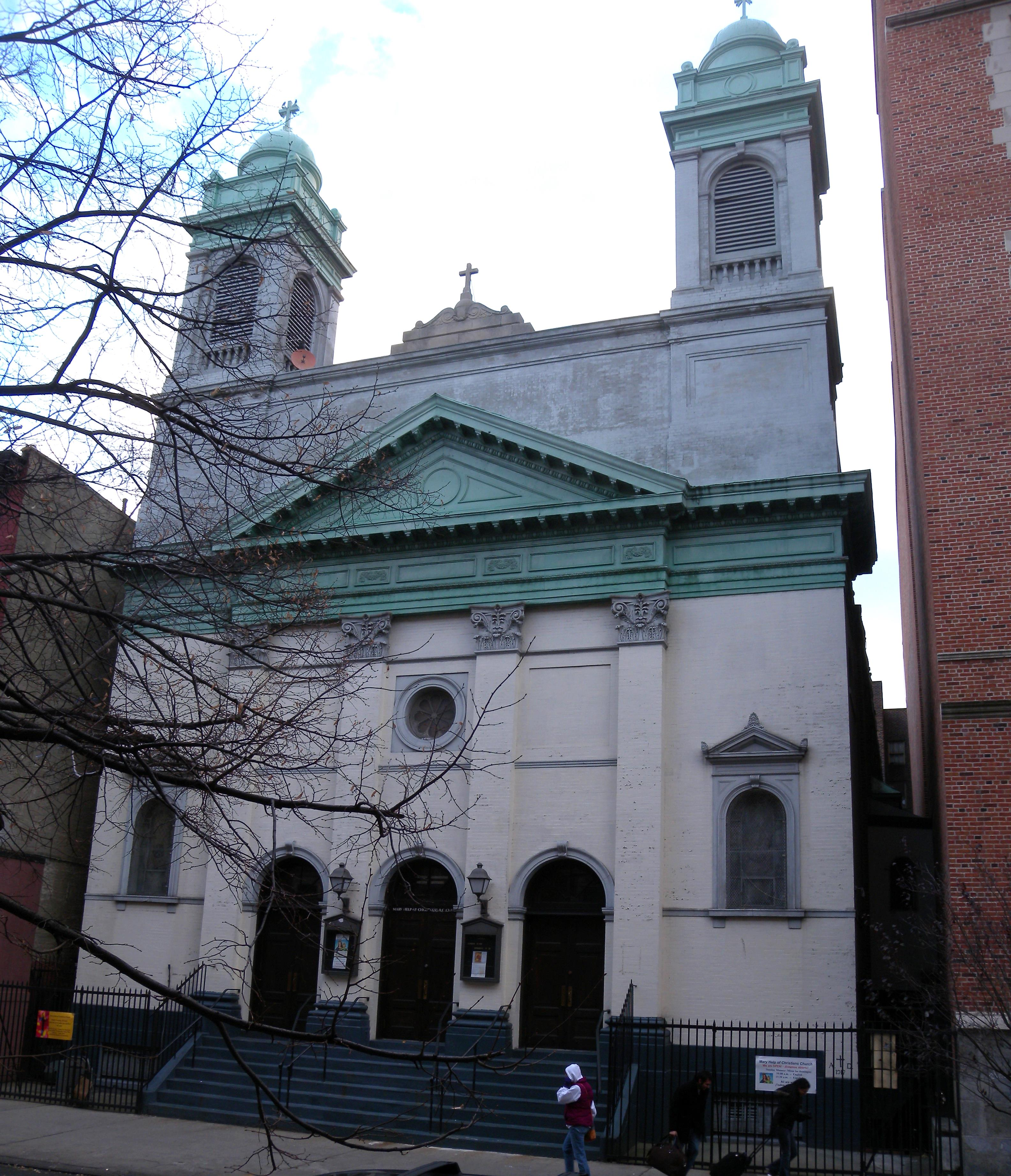
Mary Help of Christians, East 12th St

- Church of St. Albert (429-433 W. 47th St.) – Belgian National Parish
- Church of St. Alphonsus Ligouri (308 W. Broadway) – established in 1866; mission of Most Holy Redeemer (1847–1866). Formerly staffed by the Redemptorist Fathers. Closed in 1980 due to structural damage. Records currently housed at St. Anthony of Padua Shrine Church.
- Church of St. Ambrose (539 W. 54th St.) – established in 1897; closed in 1938.
- Church of St. Ann (110 E. 12th St.) – established in 1852 and closed in 2003; served as the Cathedral for Armenian-Rite Catholics from the 1980s.
- Church of St. Bernard (328 W. 14th St.) – established in 1868; merged in 2003 with Our Lady of Guadalupe Parish under which title it now serves as the parish church.
- Church of St. Boniface (47th St. at Second Ave.) – established in 1868 and closed in 1950. Records are now housed at the Church of the Holy Family.
- Church of St. Clare (W. 36th St.) – established in 1903, formerly staffed by the Franciscan Friars.
- Church of St. Clement Mary Hofbauer (W. 44th St. and 10th Avenue) – established in 1909 as a Polish National Parish; closed in the 1960s.
- Church of St. Gabriel (310 W. 37th St.) – established in 1859 and closed in 1939.
- Church of St. Joachim (26 Roosevelt St.) – established 1888; parish merged with St. Joseph Church, Chinatown (Manhattan) in 1967 due to city urban renewal project, building demolished.
- Church of St. John the Martyr (250 E. 72nd St.) – established in 1903; closed in 2015. Merged with St. John Nepomucene and St. Frances Xavier Cabrini (Roosevelt Island).
- Manhattan State Hospital Chapel of St. Joseph (Manhattan State Hospital Chapel/Ward's Island) – established in 1872; closed in ?
- Church of St. Leo (E. 28th St., between Fifth & Madison Aves.) – established in 1880 and suppressed in 1908; became a mission of St. Stephen Church. Eventually given to the Sisters of Mary Reparatrix as a monastery and retreat house, it was sold to a private developer and demolished in the 1980s.
- Church of St. Mark (Stuyvesant Ave. at Second Ave.)
- Church of St. Mary Magdalen (Avenue D, between 12th & 13th St.) – Previously located at 529 E. 17th St. (??–1945)
- Church of St. Matthew (215 W. 67th St.) – established in 1902 and closed in 1959.
- Church of St. Nicholas (125 E. 2nd St.) – established in 1833 and closed in 1960.
- Church of St. Raphael (552 W. 50th St.) – Transferred from the Italian Friars Minor to the Croatian Custody of the same Order and was renamed Sts. Cyril and Methodius.
- (The Old) Church of St. Rose of Lima (Cannon St., between Broome & Delaney St.) – established in 1868 and closed in the 1960s.
- Church of St. Sebastian (312 E. 24th St.) – Staffed by the Franciscan Friars; opened in 1921 and closed in 1971.
- Church of the Sacred Hearts of Jesus & Mary (307 E. 33rd St.) – established in 1915 as an Italian National parish. Closed 2008 and merged with Our Lady of the Scapular-St. Stephen. Demolished and replaced by a new chapel which opened in 2009 under the same patronage.
- Church of St. Teresa of Avila (184th St. at Broadway) – established in 1933; staffed by the Vincentian Fathers.
- Church of St. Thomas the Apostle (262 W. 118th St.) – established in 1889; staffed by the Salesians of Don Bosco from 1979 to 2003; closed in 2003.
- Church of St. Vincent de Paul (123 W. 23rd St.) – established in 1841 and closed in 2013.
- Church of the Assumption (427 W. 49th St.)
- Church of the Most Holy Crucifix (378 Broome St.) – established in 1925 and closed in 2005.
- Church of the Holy Agony (New York City) – established 1930, merged with St. Cecilia's 2015; Holy Agony deconsecrated 2017.
- Holy Rosary Church (Manhattan) – established 1884, merged with St. Paul Church (New York City) 2015; Holy Rosary deconsecrated 2017.
- Church of Our Lady of Peace – Merged with St. John the Evangelist Church (Manhattan) 2015; OLP building sold to the Egyptian Coptic Orthodox Christian community 2017.

=== Churches in The Bronx ===
- Church of St. Adelbert (Polish) – Located at 150th St. & Robbins Ave. (1897–1899); East 156 St. near Elton Ave. (1899–?)
- Church of St. Eugene (Ogden Ave. at 163rd St.) - closed c. 1983, demolished
- Church of St. Mary (White Plains Ave. at 215th St.) – established in 1866; closed in 2007.
- Church of St. Simon Stock - St. Joseph (Bronx, New York) - St. Joseph's Church (Bronx, New York) - established 1873, merged with Church of St. Simon Stock (Bronx, New York) 2015, St. Joseph's building desacralized November 2017.
- Our Lady of Pity - established 1908, closed 2007, demolished.
- St. Pius V Church (Bronx, New York) (420 E. 145th St.) – established in 1906, merged with St. Rita of Cascia 2015, St. Pius church building deconsecrated 2017.
- Church of St. Roch - Personal (National) parish established 1899, merged with St. Anselm's 2015, building relegated to "profane but not sordid use" November 2017.
- Church of the Visitation of the Blessed Virgin Mary (Bronx) (Bronx, New York) (160 Van Cortlandt Park South) – established in 1928; merged with St. John's Church (Bronx) 2015. Visitation deconsecrated 2017.
- Shrine Church of St. Ann (Bronx) - established 1927, merged with St. Brendan's Church (Bronx, New York) 2015; St. Ann's deconsecrated 2017.

== Churches in Dutchess County ==
- Chapel of Our Lady of Mercy (Clove Valley) - established ca. 1885 and closed ca. 1947.
- Church of the Sacred Heart (Barrytown) – established in 1886 as a parish; formerly a mission of St. Joseph in Rhinecliff. Suppressed as a parish ca. 1975.
- Church of St. Joachim (Beacon) - established in 1860; merged with St. John the Evangelist.
- Church of St. John the Baptist (Poughkeepsie) – established in 1923
- St. Patrick's Chapel (Millerton, New York)

== Churches in Orange County ==
- Chapel of St. Edward (Warwick) - established in 1887 and closed in 2007.

== Churches in Putnam County ==
- Chapel of St. Bernard (Towners) - established as a mission of St. Lawrence O'Toole in Brewster in 1875 and closed in 1957.
- Chapel of St. Paul (Lake Oscawana) - established as a mission of St. Patrick in Yorktown Heights (Westchester). Transferred to St. Columbanus in Cortlandt Manor in 1950 and closed in 1966.

== Churches in Rockland County ==
- Chapel of St. Therese (Valley Cottage) - established as a mission of St. Paul in Congers in 1927 and closed in 1963.
- Church of St. Michael (Rockland Lake) - established as a parish in 1901 and suppressed in 1927; mission of St. Paul in Congers (1927–1963); closed in 1963.

== Churches in Sullivan County ==
- Chapel of All Souls (Shandalee) - established in 1912 and closed in 1970. Formerly attached to St. Aloysius in Livingston Manor.
- Chapel of the Sacred Heart (Hankins) - established in 1919 and closed in ??.
- Chapel of St. Lucy (Cochecton) - established in 1884 as a mission of Holy Cross in Callicoon; closed after 1965.

== Churches in Ulster County ==
- Chapel of Our Lady of La Salette (Boiceville) - Closed in 2006; formerly a mission of St. Francis de Sales in Phoenicia.
- Chapel of Our Lady of Lourdes (Allaben) - Closed in 2006; formerly a mission of St. Francis de Sales in Phoenicia.
- Chapel of Our Lady of the Mountains (West Saugerties) - established in 1939 as a mission of St. Patrick in Quarryville. Merged with St. Patrick in Quarryville in 1969.
- Chapel of the Sacred Heart (Eddyville) - Formerly a mission of Holy Name of Jesus in Kingston.
- Chapel of St. Joan d'Arc (Woodstock, New York) - established in 1922; formerly a mission of St. John in West Hurley.
- Chapel of St. John the Evangelist (Clow Quarries) - established in 1848 as a mission of St. Mary of the Snow in Saugerties and merged with St. Patrick in Quarryville in 1969.
- Chapel of St. Thomas Aquinas (Veteran) - established in 1908 as a mission of St. Patrick in Quarryville. Merged with St. Patrick in Quarryville in 1969
- Chapel of St. Wendelinus (Ruby) - Formerly a mission of St. Anne, Sawkill.
- Church of the Holy Name of Jesus (Kingston) - established in 1887; formerly a mission of St. Joseph in Kingston.
- Church of St. Andrew (Ellenville) - established in 1851; formerly known as St. Mary of the Assumption. Merged with St. Mary Church in 1956.
- Church of St. Mary (Ellenville) - established in 1850; merged with St. Andrew Church in 1956.
- Church of St. Patrick (Quarryville) - established in 1886; formerly a mission of St. Mary of the Snow in Saugerties (1875–1886). Renamed St. John the Evangelist in 1969.
- Church of St. James (Milton) – established in 1874, merged with St. Mary's in Marlboro 2015.

== Churches in Westchester County ==
- Chapel of St. Anthony (Mount Vernon) - Closed in 1949; formerly attached to Our Lady of Mount Carmel in Mount Vernon.
- Chapel of St. George (Mohegan Lake) - established in 1915 and closed in 1981.
- Church of Our Lady of the Rosary (Yonkers) - Closed in 2007.
- Church of the Sacred Heart of Jesus (Port Chester) – Closed and Merged into the parish of St. John Bosco.
- Church of St. Anthony (Yonkers) - established in 1900 and closed in 1968.
- Church of St. Denis (Yonkers) - closed and merged with St. Peter's 2015.
- Church of St. Francis of Assisi (Mount Vernon) - established in 1949; formerly a mission of Our Lady of Mount Carmel in Mount Vernon. Parish moved to Baychester Avenue in the Bronx in 1966.
- Church of St. John the Evangelist (Shrub Oak) - established in 1896; suppressed ca. 1910.
- Church of St. Ursula (Mount Vernon)- Closed in 2015, merged with Sts. Peter and Paul Parish in Mount Vernon
- Church of the Holy Eucharist (Yonkers) - Established in 1909 and closed in 1960.
- Roman Catholic Church of St. Joseph (New Rochelle) - established in 1901, merged with neighboring St. Gabriel's Church in 2015 and subsequently closed in 2022.
