= St. Albert Church (New York City) =

Coordinates: 40°45′44″N 73°59′29″W

St. Albert's Church
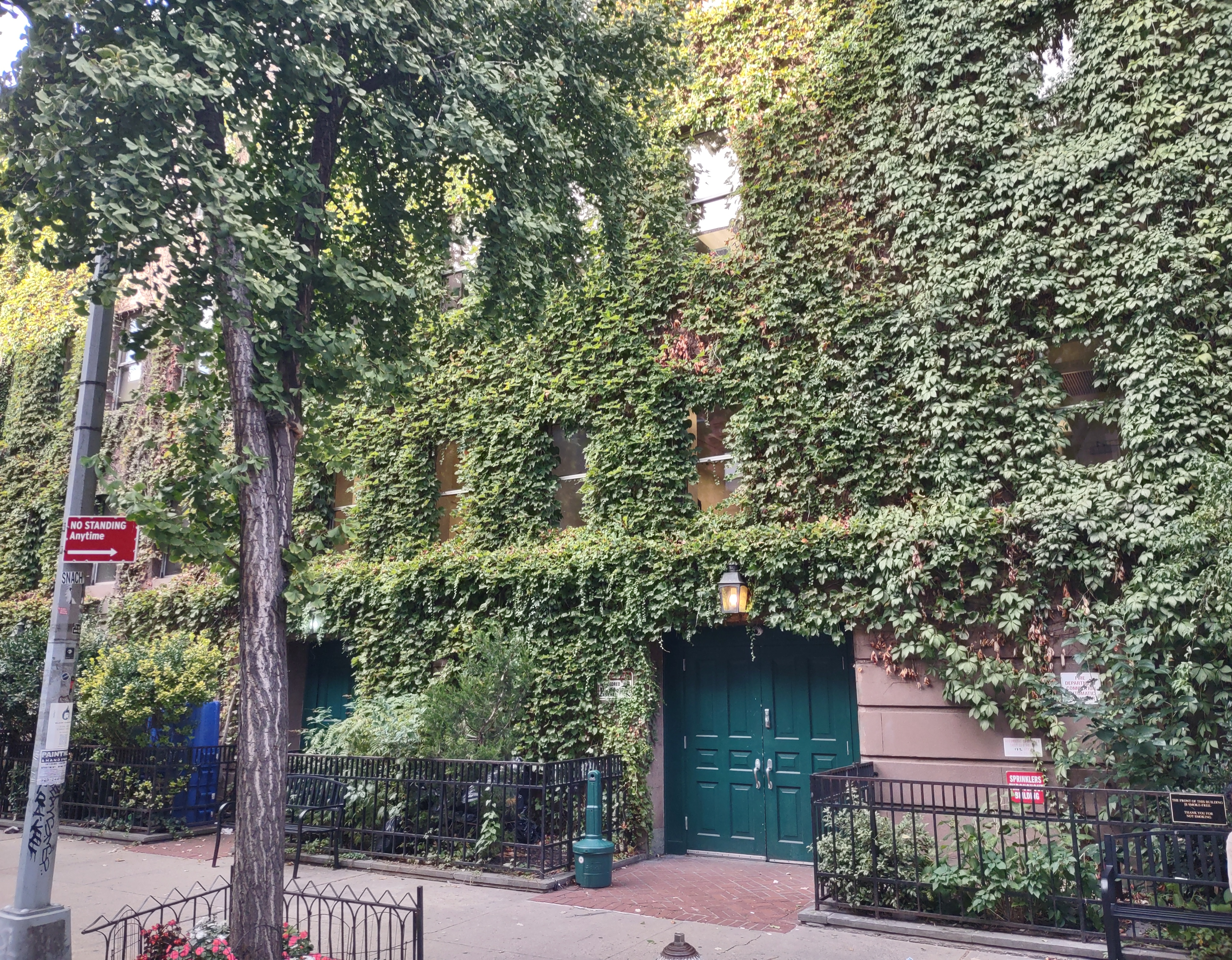
- Interactive map of the St. Albert's Church area

General information
- Location: Manhattan, New York City, United States of America
- Client: Roman Catholic Archdiocese of New York

St. Albert's Church was a Roman Catholic parish church under the authority of the Archdiocese of New York, located at 429-433 West 47th Street in Manhattan, New York City. It was dedicated in 1917 as a national parish for Belgian-Americans. The same building hosted the Belgian and Holland Immigration Bureaus. The first rector (1917-1930) was the Belgian-educated Right Reverend James F. Stillemans. The church is now closed.
