= Church of Our Lady of Pity (Staten Island) =

Roman Catholic church in New York City

Coordinates: 40°36′32.3″N 74°9′41.45″W

The Church of Our Lady of Pity
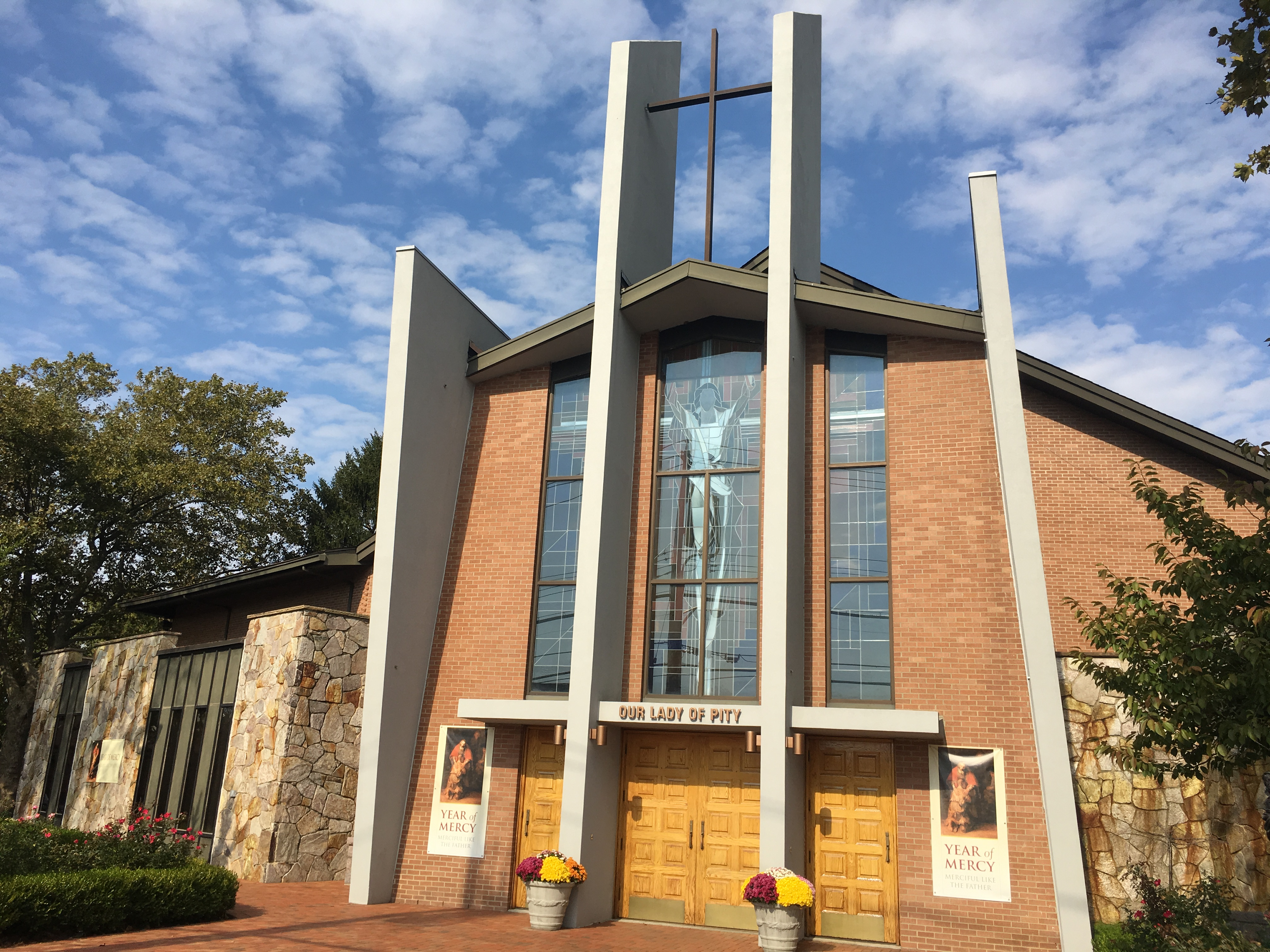
- Church of Our Lady of Pity (Staten Island, New York)
- Interactive map of the The Church of Our Lady of Pity area

General information
- Location: Staten Island, New York, United States of America
- Client: Roman Catholic Archdiocese of New York

The Church of Our Lady of Pity is a Roman Catholic parish church under the authority of the Roman Catholic Archdiocese of New York, located in Staten Island, New York City. The church is located at 1616 Richmond Avenue, just south of the Staten Island Expressway.

== History ==
Our Lady of Pity was established on Christmas 1913 as a mission church of Our Lady of Mount Carmel Parish in West Brighton, to serve members of the Italian Catholic community. Mount Carmel pastor Louis Riccio celebrated Mass in private homes until the dedication of a chapel in 1919 in Graniteville. Four years later, it became an Italian national parish under the title of "Our Lady of Pity, the Sorrowful Mother". Father John Gallo was the first resident pastor. In 1924 a church was erected at 1382 Richmond Avenue. A highlight of parish life was the annual parish feast of St. Michael the Archangel, a weekend of food, dancing and a parade that featured a truck carrying a statue of St. Michael. In 1937 it was staffed by members of the Pious Society of Saint Paul of Alba but later returned to diocesan administration.

During World War II, Staten Island held camps for enemy prisoners of war. Italian POWs were granted day passes and attended services, picnics and dances at Our Lady of Pity, several marrying young women from the parish. With an increasingly diversified population in the area, in 1954 Our Lady of Pity became a territorial parish.

In 1956, in anticipation of the construction of the Staten Island Expressway, Msgr. Ricotti purchased land at 1616 Richmond Avenue, where a parish hall and rectory were constructed. In 1965, territory south and east of the Staten Island Expressway became part of the new Holy Family parish. The parish hall served as a worship site until 1988, when the present church was dedicated by Archbishop John Cardinal O'Connor. In 1998, a Parish Center, named in honor of Cardinal O’Connor, was dedicated. The Cooley's Anemia Foundation of Staten Island hosts blood drives at the Cardinal O'Connor Center.

The parish hosts an annual “Eve of Solemn Remembrance”, sponsored by the Notre Dame Club of Staten Island in commemoration of the 9/11 terrorist attack. The Sri Lankan Catholic Community of New York and New Jersey gathers monthly at Our Lady of Pity.

=== Pastors ===
- Fr. John Gallo
- Father Cyrus Falco
- Father Joseph Cattoggio
- Msgr. Charles Roselli
- Msgr. Anthony Ricotti
- Msgr. Robert Mazziotta
- Msgr. Philip Franceschini

== Merger ==
In 2015 St. Anthony of Padua in Travis merged with Our Lady of Pity. The Feast of St. Anthony is celebrated at both parish churches, with the customary St. Anthony's Bread being distributed. In Travis, a statue of St. Anthony is carried in a procession followed by a reception in the parish hall. Fr. John J. Wroblewski, formerly pastor of St. Anthony's from 1999 to 2012 is pastor of Our Lady of Pity and St. Anthony of Padua.

== Church of St. Anthony of Padua ==
Many immigrants of various nationalities worked in the linoleum factory established in 1873. At first, Irish workers were tended by a priest from St. Mary of the Assumption in Port Richmond. Later, a Polish-speaking priest held services in a social hall. In 1908, St. Anthony of Padua was founded as a mission church by Rev. Joseph Brzoziewski, pastor of St. Adalbert's Church to serve members of the Polish Catholic community in Linoleumville. Father John W. Suchy was the first pastor. A church was built, and in 1929, a parish hall. The red—brick church suffered serious fires, in 1915 and again in 1965. Lightning struck the steeple, causing a fire and some damage in June 2012.

In 1954 it became a territorial parish.

=== Pastors ===
- Fr. John W. Suchy
- Fr. Andrew W. Gryguc, 1920 to 1957
- Fr. Raphael Pakulniewicz, 1967 to 1999
- Fr. John J. Wroblewski, 1999 to 2012
