= Church of St. Joseph in Greenwich Village =

Catholic church in New York City

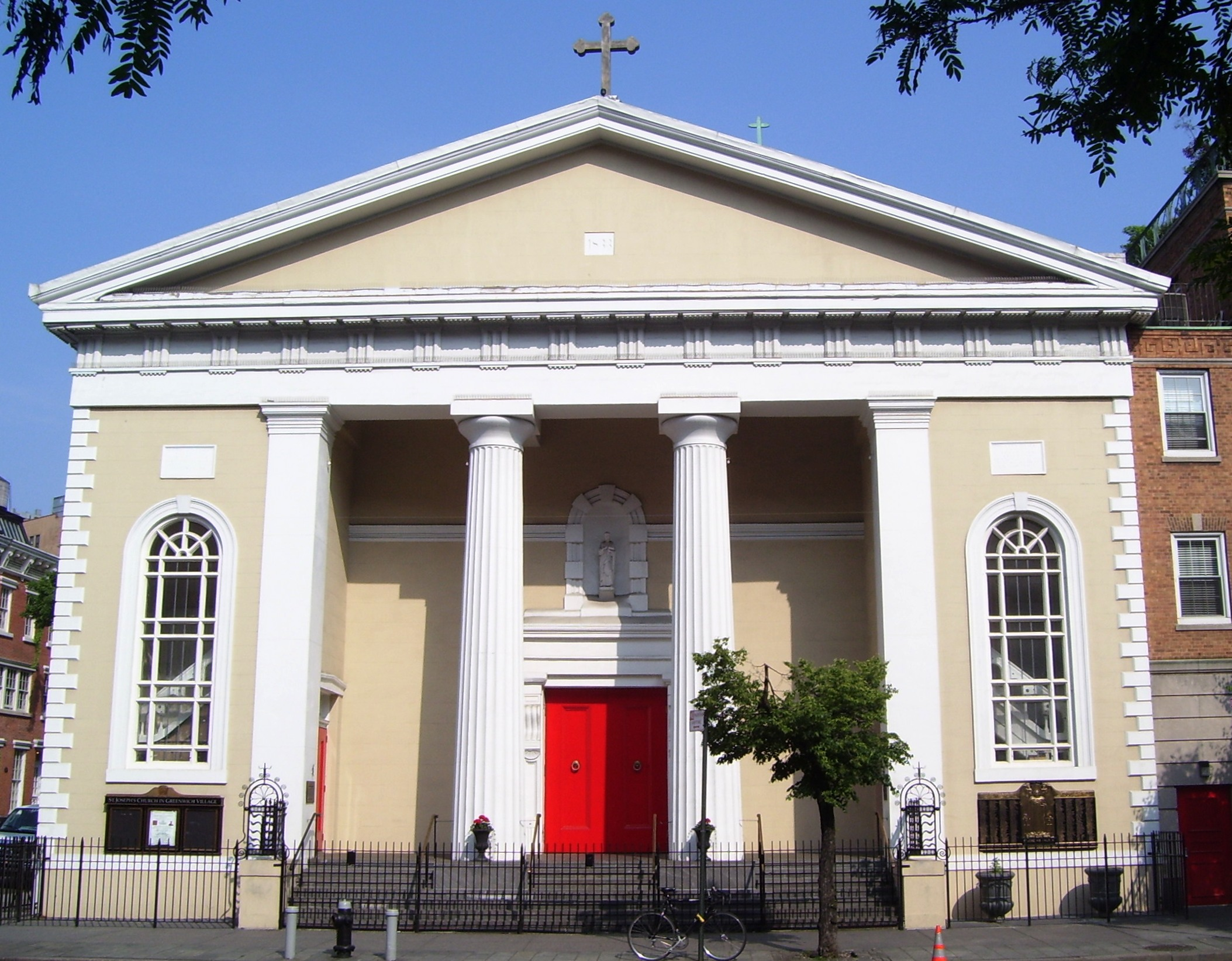
- St. Joseph's Church, Greenwich Village

- Location within Lower Manhattan Location within New York City
- 40°43′57.4″N 74°0′1.8″W
- Location: 365 Sixth Avenue, Greenwich Village, New York City
- Denomination: Catholic Church
- Religious institute: Order of Preachers
- Website: stjosephgv.nyc

History
- Status: Parish church
- Founded: 1829

Architecture
- Style: Greek Revival
- Groundbreaking: June 10, 1833

Administration
- Archdiocese: Archdiocese of New York
- Deanery: South Manhattan

The Church of St. Joseph in Greenwich Village is a Roman Catholic parish church located at 365 Avenue of the Americas (Sixth Avenue) at the corner of Washington Place in the Greenwich Village neighborhood of Manhattan, New York City. Constructed in 1833–1834, it is the oldest church in New York City specifically built to be a Roman Catholic sanctuary. (Note: Although the Church of the Transfiguration on Mott Street was built in 1815, it did not become a Catholic Church until 1853. See Church of the Transfiguration Parish history)

== History ==
St. Joseph's Parish was founded by Bishop John Dubois in 1829. At the time, the population of New York numbered roughly 203,000 and was concentrated in the southern half of Manhattan. Early church records indicate that St. Joseph's first congregants were predominantly Irish-Americans. The parish boundaries stretched from Canal Street to 20th Street, and from Broadway to the Hudson River. As additional parishes were created, St. Joseph's boundaries were trimmed. Today they span from Houston Street to 14th Street, and from University Place to Hudson Street.

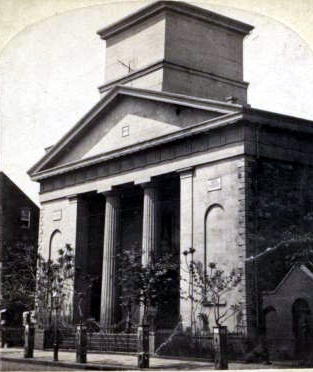
The Church of St. Joseph in Greenwich Village, c. 1860

St. Joseph's was the sixth parish to be established in Manhattan, among those still within the bounds of the Archdiocese of New York. The five parishes that preceded it were St. Peter's on Barclay Street (1785), St. Patrick's Old Cathedral on Mulberry Street (1809), St. Mary's on Grand Street (1826), St. James on Oliver Street (1827), and Transfiguration on Mott Street (1827).

After several years of using a rented hall at Grove and Christopher Streets, the cornerstone of the present church was laid on June 10, 1833. The church was designed by John Doran in the Greek Revival style, but it has been extensively renovated over the years. Two fires, one in 1855 and the other in 1885, caused extensive damage to the interior. Renovations after the second fire were supervised by Arthur Crooks. The interior of the church was restored in 1972, and a fresco of the Transfiguration, after Raphael's original in the Vatican, was discovered under layers of paint. Previously covered by a painting of the Crucifixion with the Blessed Virgin Mary and Saint John the Apostle, the altar fresco was restored. Structural restoration work was performed in 1991–1992.

St. Joseph's School was established in 1855, with Sisters of Charity teaching neighborhood girls and Christian Brothers teaching the boys. The first building was along Leroy Street, replaced in 1897 by a new building adjacent to the church.

The first public education program on AIDS ever held in Greenwich Village was held at St. Joseph's. The first meeting of Gay Men's Health Crisis also took place there. The event organized by parishioner David Pais was originally planned to be held in the school, but so many people attended that it had to be moved to the church.

When then-pastor Aldo Tos retired in 2003, the Archdiocese of New York asked the Dominican Order's Province of Saint Joseph, which was already staffing the nearby Catholic Center at New York University, to staff the parish with priests. The result was a merger of the parish with NYU's Catholic Center in December 2003.

Tos had been removed from ministry following accusations of sexual abuse of a minor, which were determined to be credible by the Archdiocese of New York. His laicization process was pending at his death in 2014.

On July 30, 2023, the Archbishop of New York, Cardinal Timothy Dolan, dedicated St. Joseph's new Divine Mercy Chapel, the first chapel for perpetual adoration in New York City.

== The church today ==
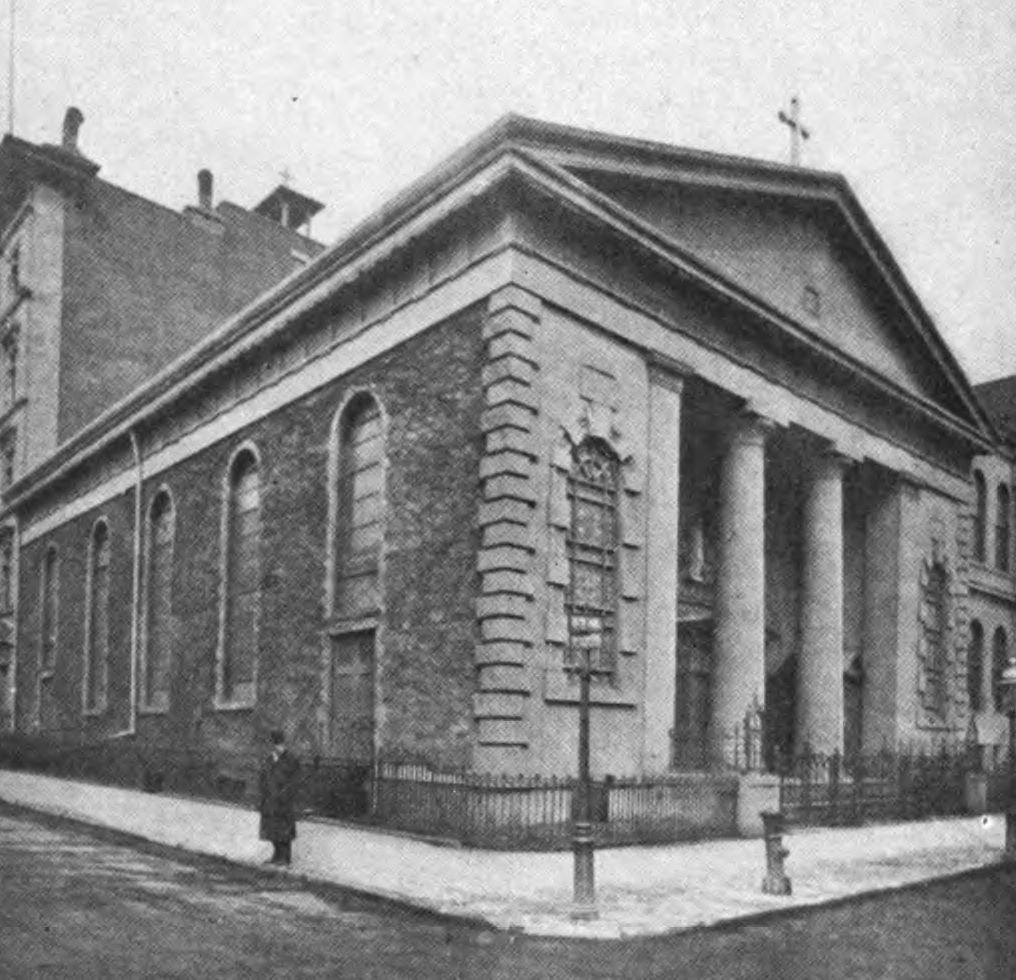
The church c.1914

The Catholic Center provides a wide spectrum of activities, programs, lectures and outreach programs. It is the center of five New York University (NYU) student clubs and for five groups of students and non-students. In addition to its campus ministry and other missions, the parish organized a weekly soup kitchen in 1982 (starting less formally in 1976) that operated for more than 30 years and has continued as an independent charity since 2015.

The parish and Catholic Center host chapters of the Thomistic Institute, an academic institute of the Dominican House of Studies which administers a network of campus chapters across the United States, for New York City and NYU, respectively.

The Parish has served as the focus of a religious and Catholic revival amongst young adults in New York City. While some churches have struggled to fill their seats; St. Joseph's doesn't have enough seats. Pizza to Pews led by Anthony Gross and Kate Depetro have been at the center of this movement. Over 200 adults meet nearby at The Pizza Box and walk to church together afterwards. Church participation, especially among young men is up significantly. 42% of young men said religion was important to them in 2026, up from 28% in 2023.

== Pastors (selection) ==
- Pastor: Jonah Teller, O.P.
  - Parochial Vicar: Basil Burroughs, O.P.
  - Parochial Vicar: Jacek Buda, O.P.
  - Sacristan: Paul Kennedy, O.P.
  - Catholic Center Director and Chaplain: Cassian Derbes, O.P.
  - Catholic Center Associate Director and Chaplain: Vincent Bernhard, O.P.
- Previous pastors:
- Boniface Endorf, O.P.
- John P. McGuire (1943-2016)
- Aldo J. Tos (1928–2014)
- John D. O'Leary (?-2008)
- Robert Wilde (?–2004)
- John McCloskey (1810–1885), later Archbishop of New York and the first U.S. cardinal
- Charles Constantine Pise (1801–1866), previously Chaplain of the United States Senate
- James Cummiskey (?–1850)
- Patrick Duffy (?–1833), first pastor
