= St. Teresa of Avila Church (New York City) =

Church building in Manhattan, New York

Coordinates: 40.852°N 73.934°W

Church of St. Teresa of Avila
- Interactive map of the Church of St. Teresa of Avila area

General information
- Location: Manhattan, New York, United States of America
- Client: Roman Catholic Archdiocese of New York

The Church of St. Teresa of Avila is a Catholic former parish church at 187th Street at Broadway in Manhattan, New York City. The parish was established in 1932 by the Archdiocese of New York in the former Church of St. Elizabeth, staffed by the Vincentian Fathers. The first pastor was Fr. Gabriel Ginard, who was invited by Cardinal Patrick J. Hayes to organize a parish for Spanish-speaking Catholics. He first organized the church as Our Lady of the Miraculous Medal Catholic Church in 1926, renamed as St. Teresa of Avila a few years later. That original church, a historic landmark first built in 1872, was destroyed by a fire in 1935. The new location of the parish has since been closed.
