= St. James Roman Catholic Church (Manhattan) =

Historic church in Manhattan, New York

- St. James' Roman Catholic Church
- U.S. National Register of Historic Places
- U.S. Historic district – Contributing property
- New York City Landmark
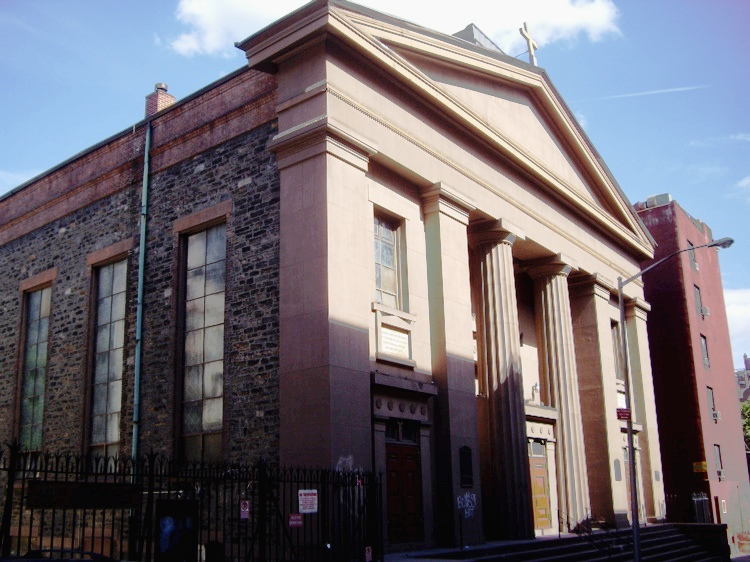
- (2007)

- Location within Lower Manhattan
- Location: 32 James Street; Manhattan, New York City
- Coordinates: 40°42′44″N 73°59′55″W
- Built: 1835–1837
- Architect: attributed to Minard Lafever
- Architectural style: Greek Revival
- Part of: Two Bridges Historic District (ID03000845)
- NRHP reference No.: 72000884
- NYCL No.: 0092

Significant dates
- Added to NRHP: July 24, 1972
- Designated CP: August 29, 2003
- Designated NYCL: January 18, 1966

St. James' Roman Catholic Church is located at 32 James Street between St. James Place and Madison Street in the Two Bridges neighborhood of Lower Manhattan, New York City. It is the second oldest Roman Catholic building in the city, built in 1835–1837 of fieldstone, with a pair of Doric columns flanking the entrance. While the neo-classical church is modeled on the published designs by Minard Lefever, and is sometimes attributed to him, there is no hard evidence of this being true. The building was once topped by a domed cupola.

== History ==
The parish was established by Bishop John Dubois in order to relieve the overcrowding at St. Peter's on Barclay Street. He purchased an Episcopal church building on Ann Street, retaining the name of Christ Church, and asked Father Félix Varela to organize a congregation. Fr. Varela also established a free school. In October 1833, it was discovered that nearby excavation had rendered Christ Church unsound. Pending the completion of a new building on James Street, premises were rented at 33 Ann Street. However, some members of the congregation finding this too far uptown, instead purchased the Reformed Presbyterian church on Chambers Street. This would become the parish of the Transfiguration, with Fr. Varela as the first pastor.

The first Mass was said in the basement of the James St. church on September 18, 1836. The following January it was dedicated under the invocation of St. James the Apostle, by Bishop Dubois. Andrew Byrne was appointed rector. Byrne was succeeded in 1842 by Rev. John Maginnis, who was in turn followed by Rev. John N. Smith. In 1848 Fr. Smith succumbed to "ship fever" contracted when administering last rites to Father Mark Murphy of Staten Island, who had contracted the illness while tending recently arrived immigrants.

Alfred E. Smith served as an altar boy at this church when he was a student at its parochial school, the former St. James Elementary School, located across the street.

The church was ordered to be closed by New York City officials in 1983, because of the danger of its roof collapsing. It was scheduled to be torn down in 1986, but was saved by the efforts of the community, especially the Ancient Order of Hibernians, the first branch of which was organized in the church in 1836. The building suffered significant damage in a fire on January 11, 2011. In 2007, St. James Parish merged with the nearby Parish of St. Joseph. The combined Parish of St. Joseph/St. James was merged again with the Church of the Transfiguration in 2015.

=== Pastors ===
- Fr. Andrew Byrne, 1837–1842
- Fr. John Maginnis, 1842
- Fr. John N. Smith, 1842–1848
- Fr. Patrick McKenna, 1848–1858
- Fr. Thomas Martin O.P. 1858–1859
- Fr. James Brennan, 1859–1865
- Fr. Felix Farrelly, 1865–1880
- Fr. John J. Kean, 1880–1901
- Fr. James B. Curry, 1901–?

== See also ==
- List of New York City Landmarks
- National Register of Historic Places listings in New York County, New York
- St. James' Episcopal Church (New York City)
