= St. Mary Magdalen Church (New York City) =

Former church in Manhattan, New York

Coordinates: 40.726°N 73.974°W

The Church of St. Mary Magdalen
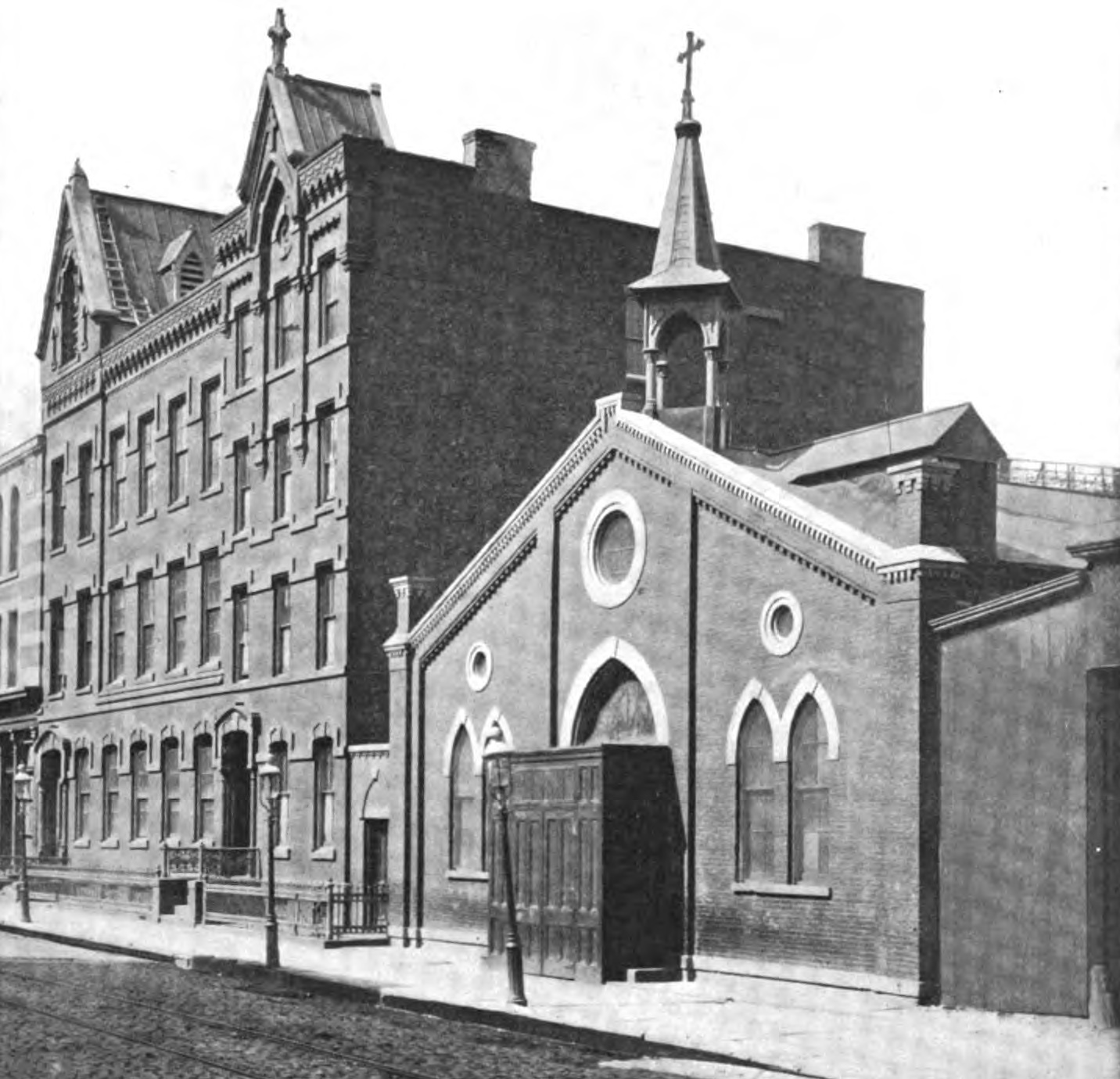
- The church and school around 1914
- Interactive map of the The Church of St. Mary Magdalen area

General information
- Location: Manhattan, New York City, United States
- Completed: 1873
- Demolished: 1940s
- Client: Roman Catholic Archdiocese of New York

The Church of St. Mary Magdalen is a former Roman Catholic parish church under the authority of the Roman Catholic Archdiocese of New York, in Manhattan, New York City.

The church was originally established in 1873 to serve a German Catholic population. It was a mid-block gable-fronted brick single-cell building with Romanesque details located at 529 E 17th Street. In 1877 the parish added a rectory at 527 E 17th Street and a school at 523 E 17th Street. The next year, the Sisters of St. Dominic began operating the school. Their convent was located north of the school at 526 E 18th street. All buildings were demolished in the early 1940s to make way for Stuyvesant Town–Peter Cooper Village.

In 1945, the parish moved to its final location at Avenue D between 12th Street & 13th Street. The parish is now closed.
