= Church of the Transfiguration, Roman Catholic (Manhattan) =

Historic church in New York City

- Church of the Transfiguration
- U.S. National Register of Historic Places
- U.S. Historic district – Contributing property
- New York State Register of Historic Places
- New York City Landmark
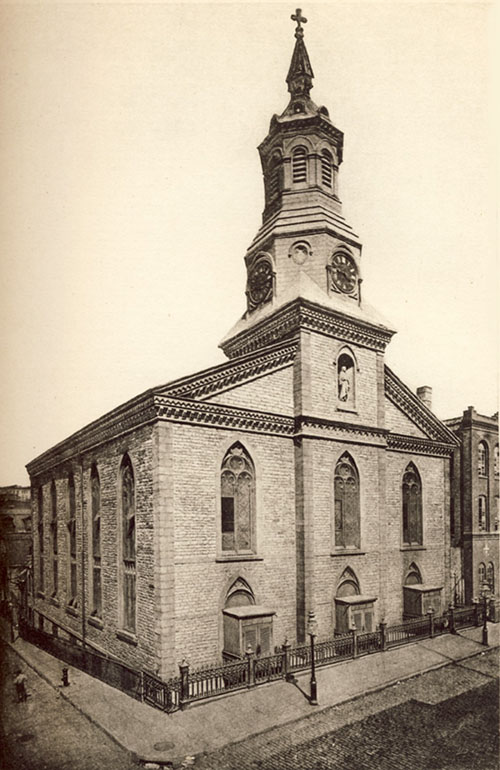
- Church of the Transfiguration, formerly Zion Protestant Episcopal Church, c. 1900
- Location: 25 Mott St. Manhattan, New York City
- Coordinates: 40°42′52.3″N 73°59′56.5″W
- Built: 1801 (rebuilt 1815)
- Architects: steeple and alterations (1868): Henry Engelbert
- Architectural style: Georgian Gothic
- Website: Official website
- Part of: Chinatown and Little Italy Historic District (ID10000012)
- NRHP reference No.: 80002682
- NYSRHP No.: 06101.000426
- NYCL No.: 0085

Significant dates
- Added to NRHP: April 16, 1980
- Designated CP: February 12, 2010
- Designated NYSRHP: June 23, 1980
- Designated NYCL: February 1, 1966

Church of the Transfiguration, Roman Catholic
- Traditional Chinese: 顯聖容 — 聖雅各伯 — 聖若瑟天主教堂
- Simplified Chinese: 显圣容 — 圣雅各伯 — 圣若瑟天主教堂
- Literal meaning: Transfiguration – St James – St Joseph Catholic Church
Transcriptions
Standard Mandarin
- Hanyu Pinyin: xiǎn shèng róng — shèng yǎ gè bó — shèng ruò sè tiān zhǔ jiào táng
Yue: Cantonese
- Jyutping: hin2 sing3 jung4 — sing3 ngaa5 gok3 baak3 — sing3 joek6 sat1 tin1 zyu2 gaau3 tong4

The Church of the Transfiguration is a Roman Catholic parish located at 25 Mott Street on the northwest corner of Mosco Street (formerly Park Street) in the Chinatown neighborhood of Manhattan, New York City. The parish, under the authority of the Archdiocese of New York, was once served by the Salesian Fathers of Don Bosco (1902-1949) and the Maryknoll Fathers (1949-2018). Since 2018, it once again has been served by diocesan clergy.

== History and description ==
The church was built in 1801 in the Georgian style of architecture for the Zion English Lutheran Church, a Lutheran congregation that subsequently converted en masse to the Protestant Episcopal Church. The church then became known as Zion Protestant Episcopal Church. It was rebuilt after a major fire in 1815 which gutted the church and 35 dwellings in the surrounding Five Points neighborhood. The church was rebuilt thanks to the effort of congregation member Peter Lorillard.

The Episcopal congregation sold the building in 1853 to the Roman Catholic Archdiocese of New York, which transferred to this building the congregation of the "Church of the Transfiguration" which was then located on Chambers Street.

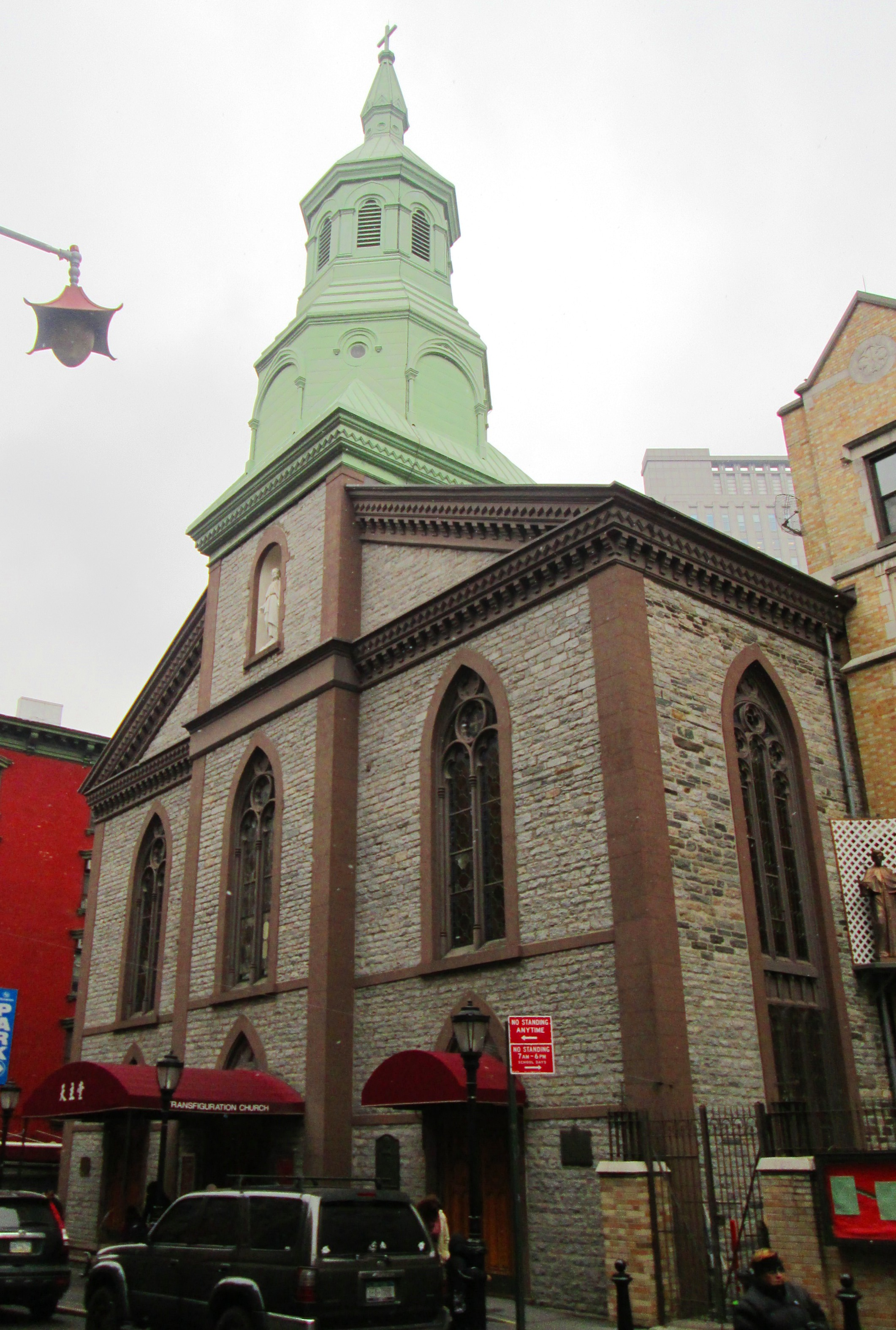
Façade of the church, 2013

The church is one of four on the Lower East Side built from Manhattan schist. The AIA Guide to New York City describes it as "[A] Georgian church with Gothic (small-paned double-hung) windows ... with Gothic tracery ... Dressed Manhattan schist makes neat building blocks, with brownstone detail." A copper-covered, octagonal bell tower designed by Henry Engelbert was added to the church building in 1868, when the Gothic windows are assumed to have been added as well. The church was designated a New York City landmark in 1966, and was added to the National Register of Historic Places in 1980.

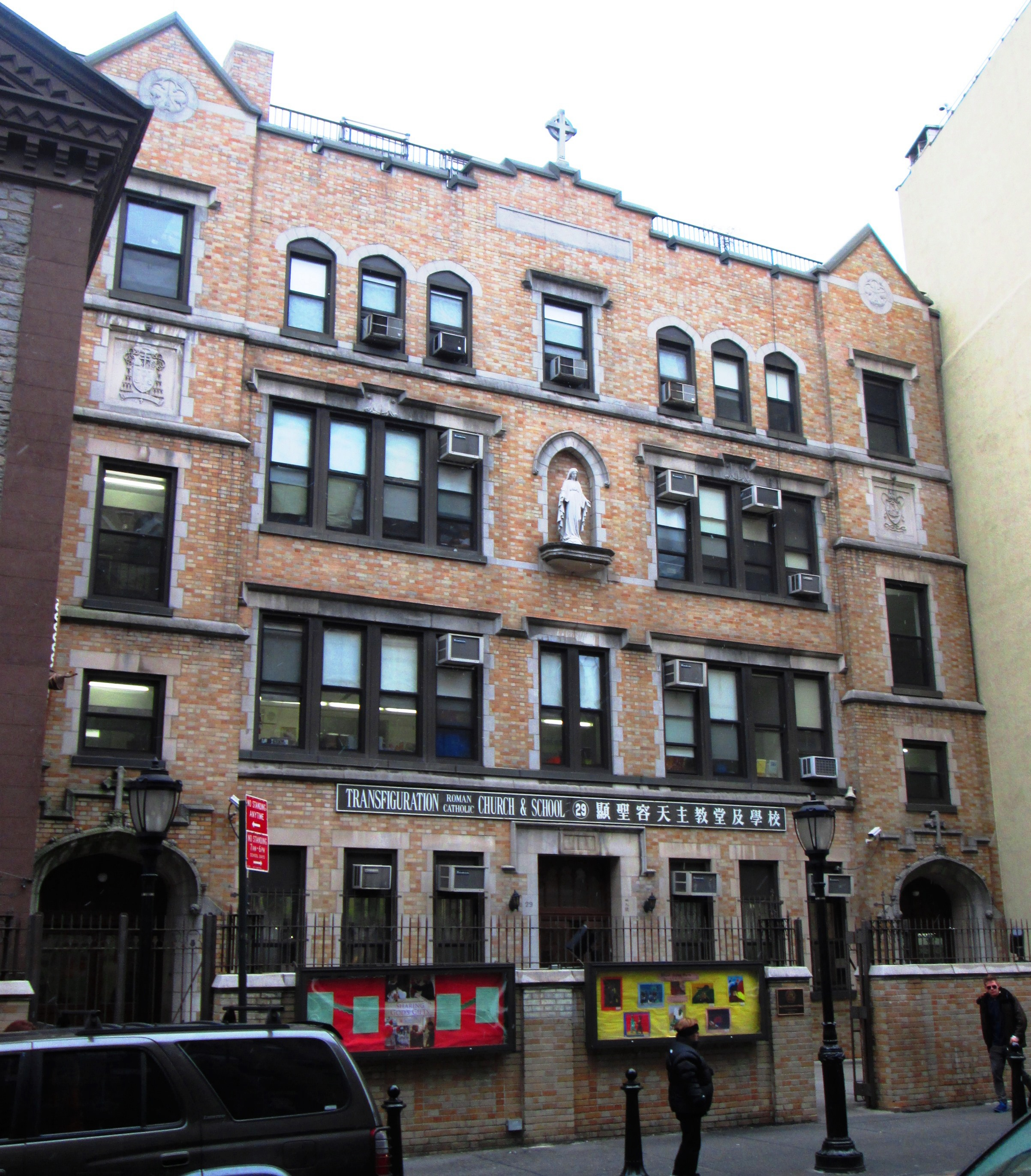
The Transfiguration School building at 29 Mott Street

== Parish ==
The Church of the Transfiguration had its origins in 1827, when the Rev. Félix Varela y Morales purchased the former Episcopalian "Christ Church" on Ann Street to serve as a home for the fourth Catholic parish established on Manhattan. When the building on Ann Street became unsafe to use, in 1836 Father Varela purchased a former Scottish Presbyterian church on Chambers Street, renaming it the "Church of the Transfiguration", and his congregation moved there. The congregation had outgrown the Chambers Street church by 1853, leading to the purchase by the (then) Roman Catholic Diocese of New York of the larger church building on Mott Street to serve as a new home for the parish. The parish therefore has the unusual history of having been in three different locations in the city, and each time having been in a building originally built as a Protestant church.

Over the years, it has continued to serve the Irish, Italian, and more recently Chinese immigrant communities. Today, this parish serves an almost entirely Chinese congregation, with Sunday Masses in English, Cantonese and Mandarin, with a Catholic School open to all religions. The Maryknoll Fathers and Brothers exclusively staff the parish as their order has historical roots in overseas missions to China in particular and the world in general. Among its former pastors was Bishop John W. Comber, M.M. (1967–1969), a Maryknoll Missionary who had served in Fushun.

== Transfiguration School ==
Transfiguration School is the Catholic parochial school linked to the Church of the Transfiguration. It was founded in 1832 by Varela and became open to children of all faiths in 1969.

The school has high academic standards and won the National Blue Ribbon Schools Award in 2011. Focusing on expansion, the school has launched a five-year campaign that will end in 2016. By that time, there will be a student body of 700 across three campuses. The campuses are the Early Childhood Campus, Transfiguration Lower School, and Transfiguration Upper School. Transfiguration Lower School is the school connected to the Church of the Transfiguration. Transfiguration Upper School's current campus was St. James Elementary School's former campus, where New York State governor Al Smith received his only education.

== Mergers ==
In 1967 St. Joachim's Church on Roosevelt Street, which was founded in 1888 by the Scalabrini Fathers, was demolished to make way for a city housing development on Park Row. The parish was merged with the nearby St. Joseph's Church, founded around 1923, also by the Scalabrini Fathers. In 2007, St. James Parish on James Street, established in 1835, merged with the nearby Parish of St. Joseph to create the combined Parish of St. Joseph/St. James. In 2015 St. Joseph/St. James was merged with the Church of the Transfiguration.
