= St. Roch's Church (Staten Island) =

Church building in New York, United States of America

Coordinates: 40°37′42.76″N 74°8′31.94″W

The Church of St. Roch
- Interactive map of the The Church of St. Roch area

General information
- Location: New York City, United States
- Client: Roman Catholic Archdiocese of New York

The Church of St. Roch is a Roman Catholic parish church in the Roman Catholic Archdiocese of New York, located at 602 Port Richmond Avenue, Staten Island, New York City. It was established in 1922. It is sometimes confused with St. Roch's Church St. in the Bronx, which was established in 1899.

== History ==
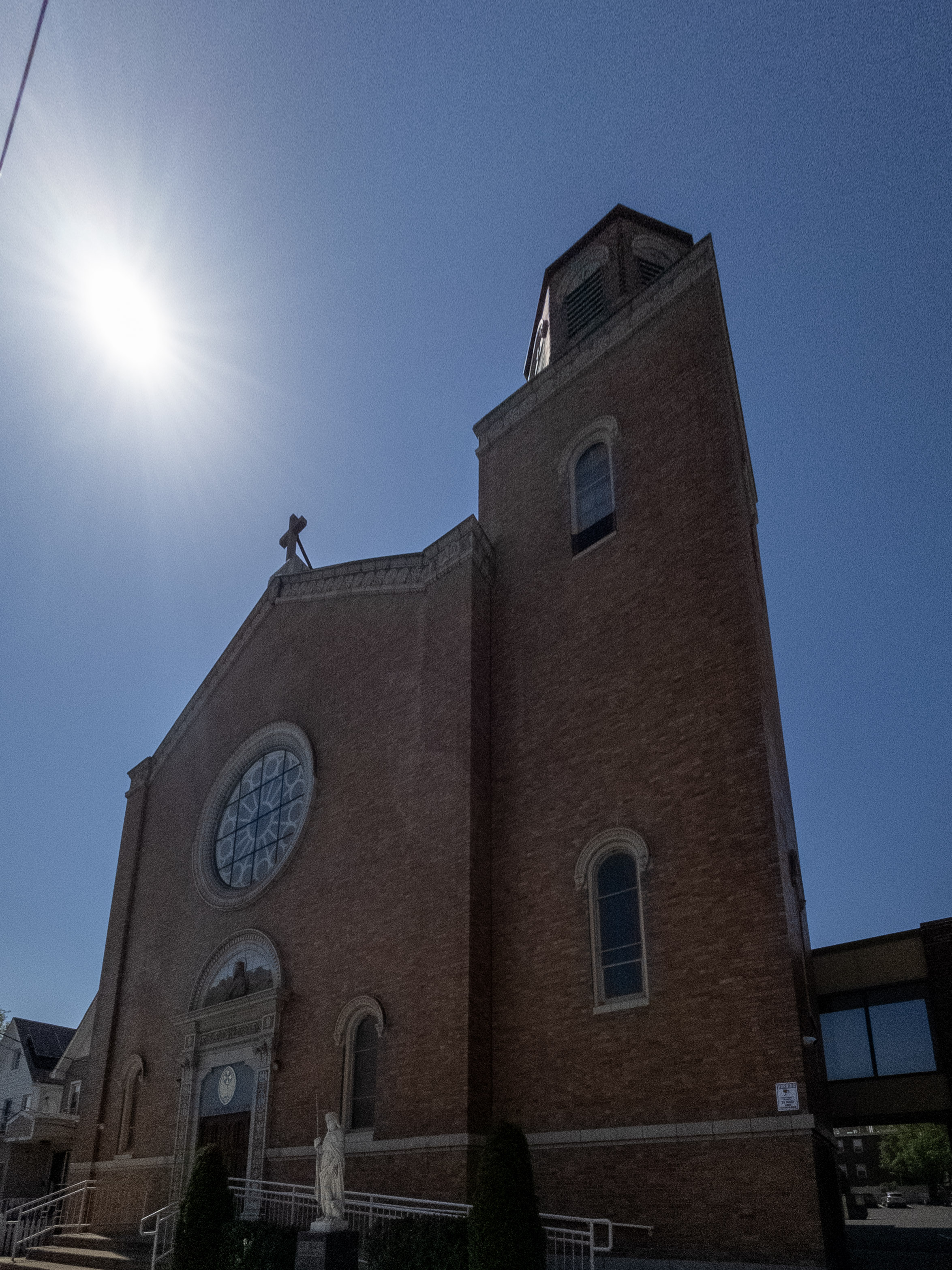
Church of St. Roch, Staten Island, April 2026

St. Roch Church began as a mission of Our Lady of Mount Carmel Church. The parish was founded in September 1922; Fr Catello Terrone was the first pastor. The altar stone held relics of St. Roch, St. Anthony, St. Lucy, St. Rita and St. Ann. Around 1928 the congregation had grown sufficiently that parishioners went door to door to selling "bricks" for $1 to finance a larger building to replace the small wooden church. The new church building was dedicated in 1929.

In 2015, the parish of St Roch merged with St. Adalbert.

=== Pastors ===
- Fr. Catello Terrone, 1922 - 1949
- Fr Pasquale Cannizzaro, 1950 - March 1972
- Fr. Francis Massarone, 1972 - 1983
- Father Alfred Pucci, September 1983
- Fr. Leo R. Prince
- Fr. James H. Hauver, 2011 - 2016

=== School ===
Before the opening of the parish school, students were taught in the parish hall. The school was dedicated by Francis Cardinal Spellman in May 1960. The school was staffed by the Sisters of St. John the Baptist. After almost a decade a declining enrollment, it was among twenty-seven designated by the Archdiocese of New York to close in June 2011.
