= St. Matthew Church (New York City) =

Coordinates: 40.7755°N 73.9840°W

The Church of St. Matthew
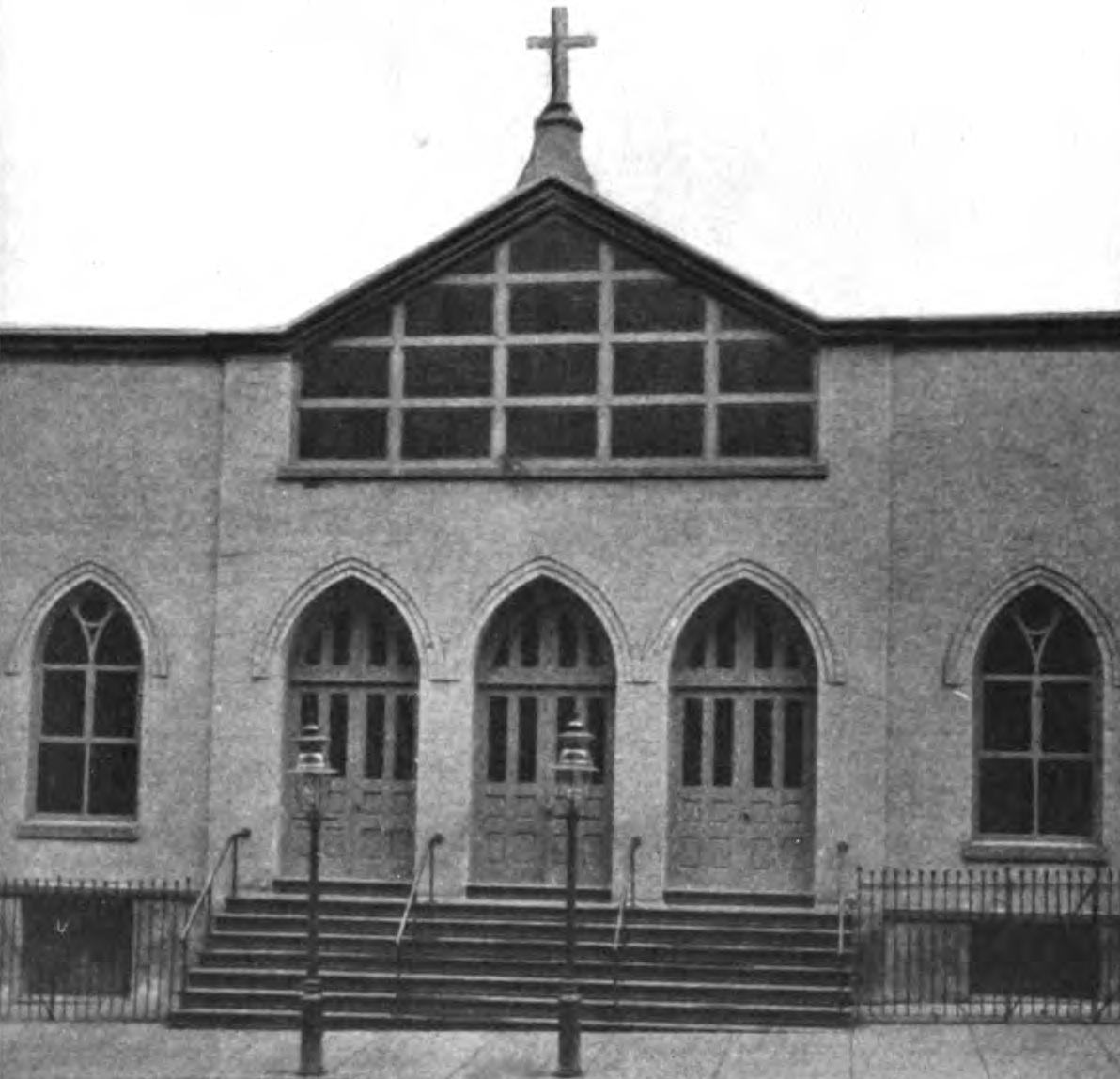
- The church around 1914
- Interactive map of the The Church of St. Matthew area

General information
- Location: Manhattan, New York City, United States
- Client: Roman Catholic Archdiocese of New York

The Church of St. Matthew was a Roman Catholic parish church under the authority of the Roman Catholic Archdiocese of New York, located at 215 West 67th Street in Manhattan, New York City, United States. The parish was organized by priest Patrick F. Maughan and canonically established on September 21, 1902.

Mass was held in a temporary rectory in the basement of 166 West 65th Street in Manhattan until November 29, 1903, when the first mass was said at the church on West 67th Street. The building, which cost less than $10,000 to erect, was of the Gothic architectural style and sat between 600 and 700. In a 1904 piece in Our Sunday Visitor, Maughan was noted as a "energetic worker" who helped with the physical work of building the church, including making the wardrobes and the cabinetry in the vestry, the pedestals on which statues of Matthew the Apostle and the Sacred Heart stood, along with much of the paint work. The church was blessed by Archbishop John Murphy Farley on September 25, 1904.

In October 1906, land was bought for a rectory behind the church, which was completed on May 1, 1907. The parish purchased a nearby Baptist church on September 15, 1911, initially intended to serve as a parochial school, though it turned into a hall for the various societies of the parish, as well as a Sunday school. The parish was suppressed in 1959. The site became part of the Lincoln Towers apartment complex.
