= St. Lucy's Chapel (Cochecton, New York) =

Church in New York, United States

Coordinates: 41.69941°N 75.05380°W

The Chapel of St. Lucy
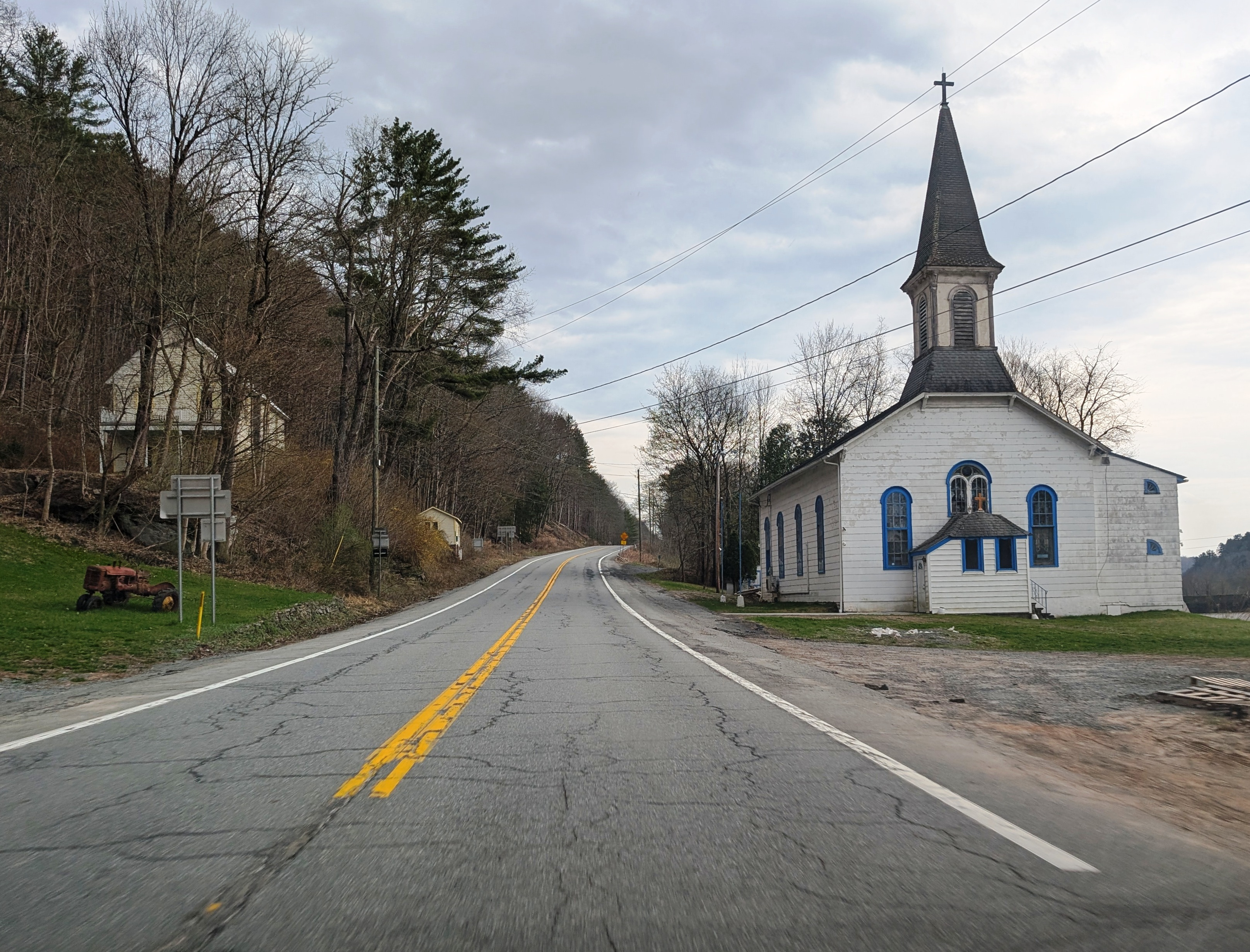
- Chapel seen on the right along NY 97 southbound

General information
- Location: Cochecton, Sullivan County, New York, United States
- Client: Roman Catholic Archdiocese of New York

The Chapel of St. Lucy is a former Roman Catholic parish church under the authority of the Roman Catholic Archdiocese of New York, located in Cochecton, Sullivan County, New York. The church was built in 1878, and the parish was established in 1884 as a mission of Holy Cross in Callicoon; the parish closed after 1965.
