= Church of the Assumption (New York City) =

Coordinates: 40°45′48.5″N 73°59′25.99″W

The Church of the Assumption
- Interactive map of the The Church of the Assumption area

General information
- Location: Manhattan, New York, United States of America
- Client: Roman Catholic Archdiocese of New York

The Church of the Assumption is a former Roman Catholic parish church under the authority of the Roman Catholic Archdiocese of New York, located at 427 West 49th Street in Manhattan, New York City.

== History ==
The parish was established in 1858 by Father Raffeiner, for German Catholics on the Upper West Side. The cornerstone of a new larger church building on W 49th St. was laid by Archbishop John Hughes on May 1, 1859, and was dedicated on December 4 of that year. The church basement served as a school and parish hall until 1873, when a school was erected under pastor Ströhle. The school, which in 1914 had about 450 pupils, was staffed by the School Sisters of Notre Dame, whose convent was on 49th St.

In October 1910 Reverend John P. Neumann became pastor. The Assumption Lyceum, a club for the young men of the parish, was built under his direction.
