= St. Adalbert's Church (Staten Island) =

Church building in New York, United States

Coordinates: 40°37′48.13″N 74°8′48.8″W

The Church St. Adalbert
- Interactive map of the The Church St. Adalbert area

General information
- Location: Staten Island, New York, United States of America
- Client: Roman Catholic Archdiocese of New York

The Church St. Adalbert is a parish church under the authority of the Roman Catholic Archdiocese of New York, located in Staten Island, New York City. The parish was established in 1901.

== History ==
Prior to the founding of a national parish on Staten Island, most members of the Polish Catholic community continued to attend the Church of St. Stanislaus Bishop and Martyr Church (New York City) in the East Village, Manhattan in Manhattan. Efforts to organize for the purpose of establishing a Polish parish on Staten Island were initially hampered by a failure to agree on where to situate a church to serve the widely scattered community. The matter was effectively resolved when John Mojecki donated land in Port Richmond. Committee members the consulted Rev. John H. Strzelecki, the pastor of St. Stanislaus.

Parishioners chose the name of the parish, and the Polish Roman Catholic Church of St. Adalbert, B. M. was incorporated in June 1901. Rev. Michael Slupek was appointed the first pastor and celebrated Mass for in St. Mary's parish hall. The new congregation soon raised funds to construct a small wooden building, which was completed in 1903. On November 13, 1921, a joint church and school building on Morningstar Road was dedicated.

In 1908, a mission church which later became the parish of St. Anthony of Padua was established in Linoleumville. The parish of St. Stanislaus Kostka also developed from St. Adalbert's.

In 1965, due to the condition of the building, Mass was held in the school auditorium, until such time as a new building could be raised. The new St. Adalbert's Church was dedicated in 1968.

St. Adalbert's parochial school opened in 1905 in the basement of the church. The Felician Sisters staffed the school until 1997. In 1960 the school moved to a larger building. The school taught Polish until it was phased out in the 1960s. The parish school can count one priest and eight nuns as alumni. In 1999, St. Adalbert's was named CYO Parish of the Year on Staten Island. In 2001, the ethnic heritage of the parish was about 40 percent Polish, 40 percent Italian and 20 percent others, including Filipino.

=== Pastors ===
- Rev. Michael Slupek, 1901 - November 1902
- Rev. Joseph Brzoziewski, 1902 - 1965
- Monsignor John S. Felczak, 1965 - 1974
- Fr. Alexander Horembala, 1974 - 1992
- Fr. John Hynes, 1992 - 1998
- Fr. Eugene Carrella, 1998 - 2014
- Fr. James Garisto, administrator, 2014
- Fr. Albin Roby, Pastor, 2016

=== Merger ===
In 2015, the parish of St. Adalbert merged with that of St Roch, to form the new parish of St. Adalbert - St. Roch.
