= All Souls Chapel (Shandelee, New York) =

Coordinates: 41°52′39″N 74°52′21″W

The Chapel of All Souls
- Interactive map of the The Chapel of All Souls area

General information
- Location: Shandelee, Livingston, Sullivan County, New York, United States
- Completed: 1917
- Client: Roman Catholic Archdiocese of New York

The Chapel of All Souls is a former Roman Catholic parish church under the authority of the Roman Catholic Archdiocese of New York, located in Shandelee, Livingston, Sullivan County, New York. It was established in 1912 and closed in 1970. It was formerly attached to St. Aloysius in Livingston Manor. The address is on Shandelee Road, Livingston Manor, New York 12758.

"St. Aloysius Church in Livingston Manor was built in 1896. the Sacred Heart Church in DeBruce was built in 1906, the All Souls Church in Shandelee was built in 1917."
