= St. Mary's Church (Bronx) =

Church building in New York City, United States

Coordinates: 40.880°N 73.864°W

The Church of St. Mary
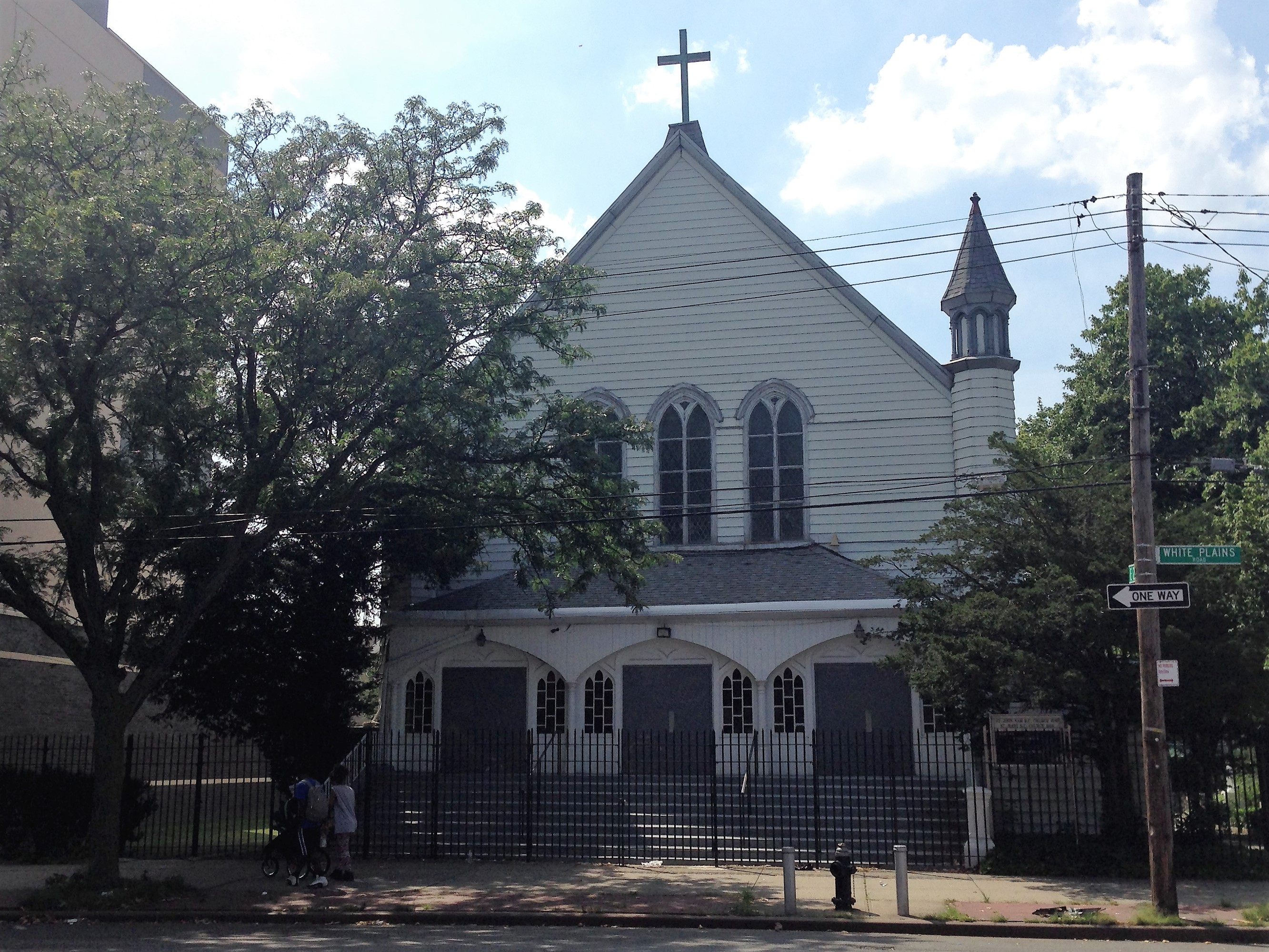
- St. Mary's Church (Bronx)
- Interactive map of the The Church of St. Mary area

General information
- Location: Williamsbridge, Bronx, New York City, New York, United States of America
- Client: Roman Catholic Archdiocese of New York

The Church of St. Mary is a former Roman Catholic parish church under the authority of the Roman Catholic Archdiocese of New York, located at White Plains Road at 215th Street in Williamsbridge, Bronx, New York City, New York. The church served the Williamsbridge area along with a parish school on East 215th Street, and later in the 1950s was closed and relocated to Carpenter Avenue and East 224th Street to accommodate the growing student population and shift of parishioners. The parish church was closed partly due to the community's changing demographics in the 1990s, reducing the Catholic population to a point where the Archdiocese of New York could no longer support a Catholic parish in the area.

== Parish history ==
St. Mary's was established first as a mission of St. Raymond's Church around 1866. The Rev. Patrick O'Sullivan established St. Mary's as a parish in 1886. In 1914, it was reported that the parishioners numbered 1,100 and that the church property, which included the school, was valued at $50,000, with a debt of $12,000. The Archdiocese announced on January 19, 2007 the church's closure.

In the 1940s to 1960s the parish population was mainly of Irish descent and also included many Italians and Italian-Americans who otherwise would have attended the nearby Italian National church, Immaculate Conception, on nearby Gun Hill Road. The Italian church was administered by the Capuchin Franciscans who were mainly immigrants from Italy. St. Mary was the official archdiocesan parish church for the area known as Williamsbridge. The church was in the center of what was once the town square of Williamsbridge, before that section of Westchester County was absorbed by the borough of the Bronx in the establishment of Greater New York City.

In the 1950s and early 60s the pastor of St. Mary's was Rt. Rev. Monsignor Edward Giblin. His associate pastors were Father Joseph H. Traube and Father Raymond Foster. Father Traube went on to become pastor of St Gabriel's Church in New Rochelle. He died at about age 64.

== St. Mary's Parish School ==
In 1914, it was reported that "the school, established in 1908, is conducted by 3 Ursuline Nuns and 4 lay teachers, and there are 103 boys and 107 girls enrolled."

== Notable parishioners/alumni ==
- Sal Mineo - Academy Award-nominated actor. Raymond Danowski Jr. - Donated the Raymond Danowski Poetry Library to Emory University.

== Pastors ==
- Rev. Patrick O'Sullivan (1886-1888)
- Rev. Edward J. O'Flynn (1888-1890)
- Rev. James W. Kelly (1890-1892)
- Rev. John J. Carr (1892-), assisted in 1914 by the Rev. Edward V. Higgins
