= St. Alphonsus Ligouri Church (New York City) =

Former church in Manhattan, New York

Coordinates: 40°43′19.15″N 74°0′15.5″W

The Church of St. Alphonsus Liguori
- Interactive map of the The Church of St. Alphonsus Liguori area

General information
- Location: Manhattan, New York City, United States
- Client: Roman Catholic Archdiocese of New York

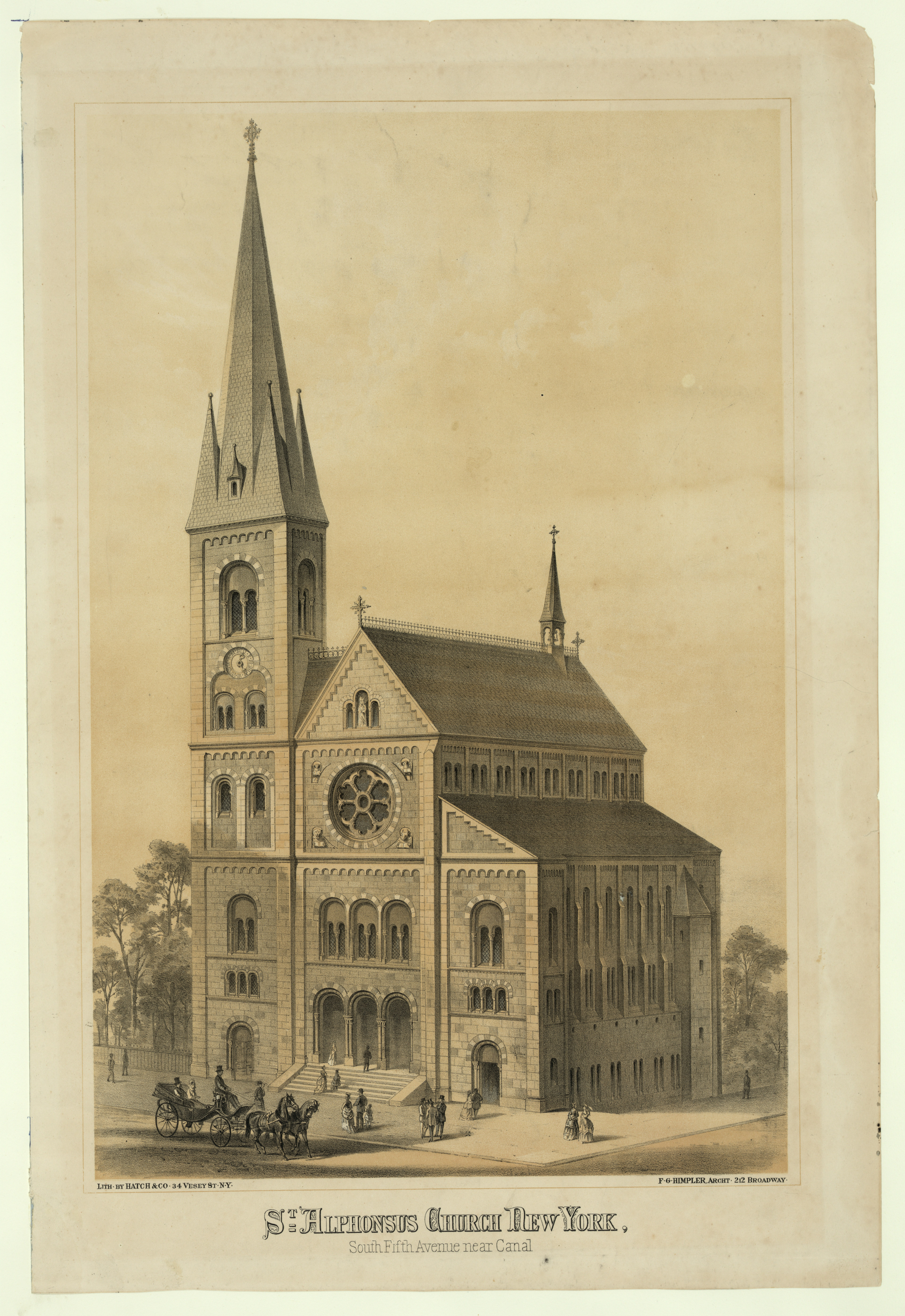

The Church of St. Alphonsus Liguori was a Catholic parish church, located at 308 West Broadway in SoHo, Manhattan, New York City. It was under the authority of the Roman Catholic Archdiocese of New York.

== History ==
It was established as a mission of Most Holy Redeemer in 1847, as a church to serve German-speaking Catholics. The church was at 10 Thompson Street (between Canal and Grand Streets), and the cornerstone of the church was laid by New York's Archbishop John Hughes on September 8, 1847. It remained a mission of Most Holy Redeemer until 1866, when it was elevated to parish status. The church was staffed by the Redemptorist Fathers, and its first pastor was Rev. F. Nicholas Jaeckel.

In 1870, the church moved to 308 West Broadway (then South Fifth Avenue), where the cornerstone was laid by Cardinal John McCloskey on September 4, 1870, and dedicated on April 7, 1872. The new church was designed by Francis Hempler in the Romanesque style.

The church was built on marshy ground that caused the building to sink significantly; by the 1970s it was sinking at the rate of about half an inch per year. Due to structural concerns, the parish was closed in October 1979; the parish records were transferred and are now housed at St. Anthony of Padua Shrine Church. In 1980, the property was sold and the church demolished in 1981. The Soho Grand Hotel now stands on the site of the church.
