= St. Adelbert's Church (Bronx) =

Coordinates: 40°49′13.5″N 73°54′53″W

The Polish Church of St. Adalbert
- Interactive map of the The Polish Church of St. Adalbert area

General information
- Location: Melrose, The Bronx, New York City, New York, United States
- Client: Roman Catholic Archdiocese of New York

The Polish Church of St. Adalbert is a former Roman Catholic parish church under the authority of the Roman Catholic Archdiocese of New York, located at East 156 Street west of Elton Avenue since 1899 in Melrose, Bronx, New York City.

== Parish history ==
The parish was established in 1897 at 150th Street & Robbins Avenue, and moved to its final location in 1899. Other sources claim the parish was established in 1898. It was founded as a national parish to serve Polish immigrants in the area.

Armed forces chaplain, the Rev. Francis Mylanarski of St. Stanislaus', Manhattan was transferred here in 1919.

The parish is now closed. "In 2008, this parish does not appear on the list of archdiocesan parishes, but the Franciscan Friars of the Renewal may be using some of the buildings."
