= St. Stanislaus Bishop and Martyr Church (New York City) =

Church in Manhattan, New York

Coordinates: 40°43′36.29″N 73°59′4.89″W

The Church of St. Stanislaus Bishop & Martyr
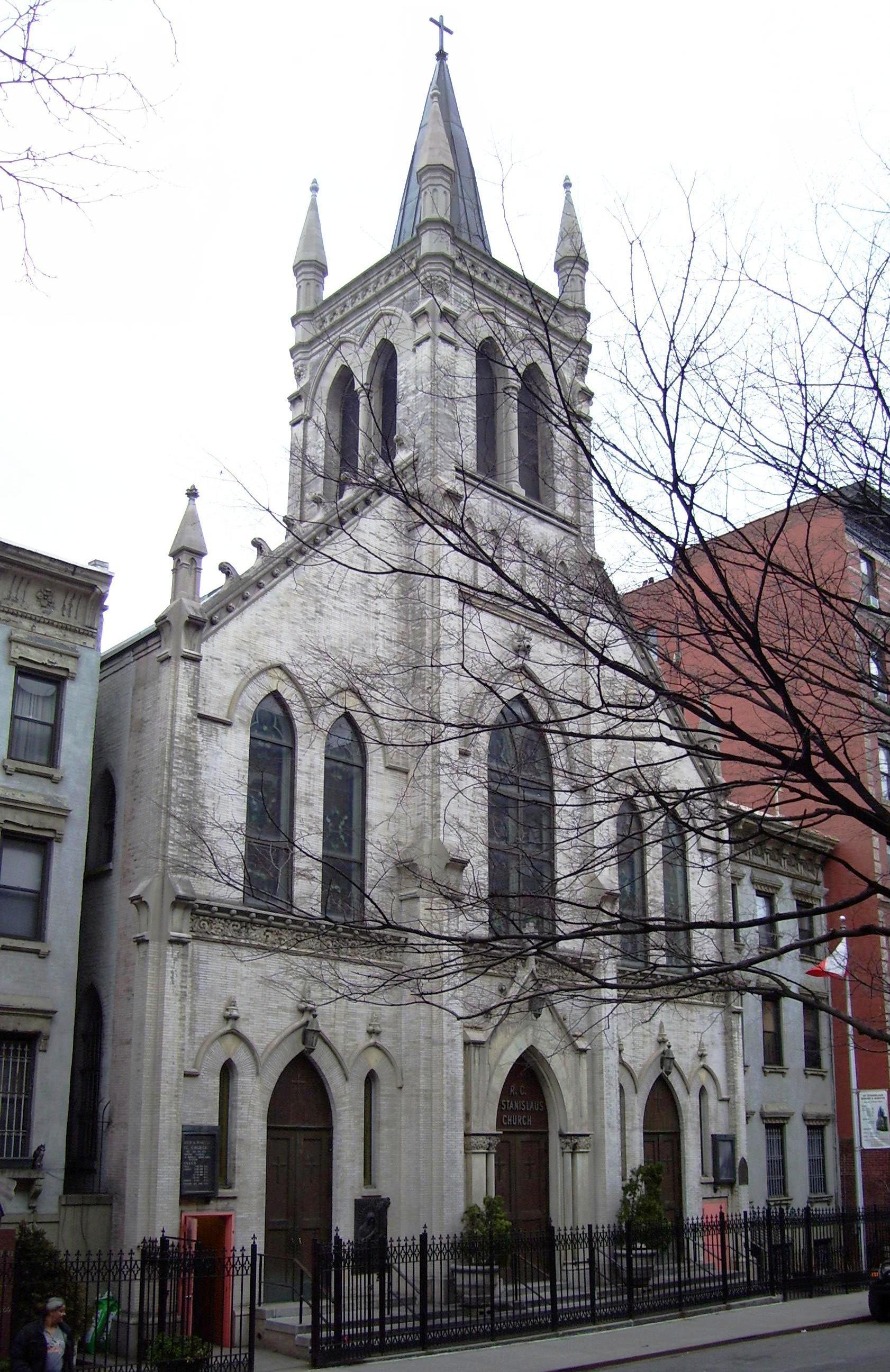
- Photographed in 2011
- Interactive map of the The Church of St. Stanislaus Bishop & Martyr area

General information
- Location: East Village, Manhattan, New York City, United States of America
- Construction started: 1900 (for church); 1907 (for school)
- Completed: 1901 (for church)
- Cost: $30,000 (for 1907 school)
- Client: Roman Catholic Archdiocese of New York

Design and construction
- Architects: Arthur Arctander of 523 Bergen Avenue, the Bronx (for 1900-1901 church and 1907 school)

Website
- St. Stanislaus Bishop and Martyr's Church, Manhattan

The Church of St. Stanislaus Bishop & Martyr is home to the oldest Polish Roman Catholic parish in the Roman Catholic Archdiocese of New York, It is located at 101 East 7th Street between First Avenue and Avenue A in the East Village neighborhood of Manhattan, New York City.

== History ==
The parish was established in 1872 in a small wooden church at 318 Henry Street until moving to its current location in 1900. Before its current sanctuary, it occupied the Stanton Street Dutch Reformed Church (1845) which had subsequently been used by Congregation B'nai Israel. The address then was 43 Stanton Street. The new church was dedicated by Archbishop M.A. Corrigan and Bishop J.M. Farley on May 19, 1901. A special feature of The New York Times in 1901, mentioned the church, described simply as "the Polish church," among other Catholic structures on the Lower East Side of Manhattan, describing the group "for the most part...limit[ing] themselves to the functions of a parish church, in districts where social needs are otherwise supplied," without comment on other facilities attached.

The parish is staffed by the Fathers of St. Paul the First Hermit. One of its rectors was the Rev. Francis Mylanarski, who served in the armed forces as a chaplain before being was transferred to St. Adelbert's Church (Bronx, New York) in 1919.

== Buildings ==
The church was built 1900–1901 to the designs of Arthur Arctander. A three-storey brick and stone parish school and dwelling house at 104-106 Saint Mark's Place was built in 1907 to designs of Arthur Arctander of 523 Bergen Avenue, the Bronx for $30,000.
