= St. Edward's Chapel (Warwick, New York) =

Church in New York, United States

The Chapel of St. Edward

General information
- Location: Warwick, Orange County, New York, United States of America
- Coordinates: 41.3343°N 74.3572°W
- Client: Roman Catholic Archdiocese of New York

The Chapel of St. Edward was a Roman Catholic parish church under the authority of the Roman Catholic Archdiocese of New York, located in Warwick, Orange County, New York. The parish was established in 1887 and closed in 2007.

The former church building on North Main Street subsequently became the St. Ignatius Antiochian Orthodox Church.
