= Church of St. Simon Stock – St. Joseph =

Catholic church in New York City, USA

Coordinates: 40°51′17.97″N 73°53′57.23″W

The Church of St. Simon Stock – St. Joseph
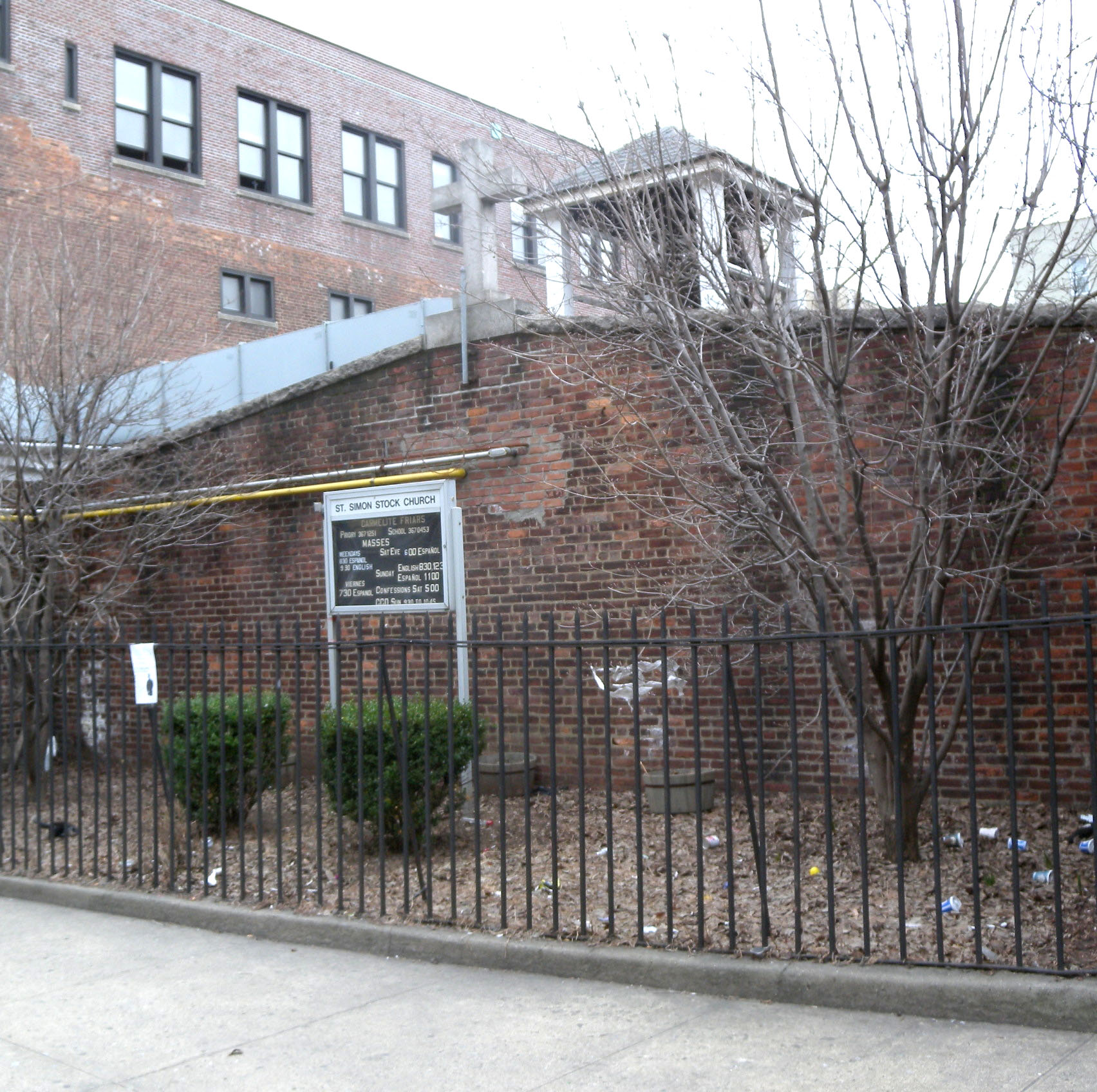
- Photographed in 2010

General information
- Location: Bronx, New York City, United States of America
- Client: Roman Catholic Archdiocese of New York

The Church of St. Simon Stock – St. Joseph is a Roman Catholic parish church under the authority of the Roman Catholic Archdiocese of New York, located at 2191 Valentine Avenue, Bronx, New York City. It was established in 1919 and has been continuously staffed by the Carmelite Fathers since its founding.

== History ==
The parish of St. Simon Stock was founded by the Irish Carmelites of Our Lady of Scapular Mount Carmel in lower Manhattan. The first Mass was offered in a two-story frame house at "Carmel Hill", at 182nd Street and Valentine Avenue, on Palm Sunday, March 28, 1920.

Construction began on the church in 1921, but was interrupted by the need to build a school. On occasion, sermons were given in Irish Gaelic.

== Pastors ==
- Fr. William G. O’Farrell, 1920 – 1925
- Fr. Elias Vella, 1925 – 1926
- Fr. Louis Gerhard, 1926 – 1929
- Fr. Dionysius Flanagan, 1929 – 1931
- Fr. Patrick Russell, 1931 – 1933
- Fr. Elias Holland, 1933 (10 months)
- Fr. Mel Daly, 1933 – 1961
- Fr. Gerard McCarthy, 1961 – 1968
- Fr. John Parsons, 1968 – 1973
- Fr. Martin Miller, 1974 – 1979
- Fr. Vincent Ciorciari, 1980 – 1981
- Fr. James Goulding, 1982 – 1983
- Fr. Patrick McGuigan, 1983 – 1988
- Fr. Mike Kissane, 1988 – 1992
- Fr. Ruben Rodriguez, 1992 – 1998
- Fr. Mike Kissane, 1998 – 2003
- Fr. Nelson Belizario, 2003 – 2019
- Fr. Mike Kissane, 2019 - current

Church of St. Simon Stock – St. Joseph

General information
- Location: Bronx, New York City, United States of America
- Client: Roman Catholic Archdiocese of New York

== St. Joseph's Church ==
The Church of St. Joseph was a Roman Catholic parish church in the Upper Morrisania neighborhood under the authority of the Roman Catholic Archdiocese of New York, located at 1949 Bathgate Avenue, Bronx, New York City. The parish was established in 1873.

=== History ===
St. Joseph's Parish was founded in 1873 by Archbishop John McCloskey to serve the German Catholics in the Tremont area of the Bronx. The original church, dedicated in 1874 fronted Washington Avenue near 177th Street. The first resident pastor was the Rev. Joseph M. Sorg.

A new church building was begun in October 1898. Located near the original building, it faced Bathgate Avenue.

As of 2015, out of repair, the church had been closed and the congregation merged with the Church of St. Simon Stock about 3/4 of a mile away. St. Joseph's church building was desacralized by a decree effective November 30, 2017.

=== Architecture ===
The neo-Gothic church was built of white stone quarried from the lot, and faced with polished granite on the front and rear ends. When built, the church provided seating for about 1,500 persons.

=== School ===
St. Joseph's Catholic School closed in 2019.
