= Our Lady of Mercy's Chapel (Clove Valley, New York) =

Church in New York, United States

Coordinates: 41°41′37.4″N 73°39′43.3″W

The Chapel of Our Lady of Mercy

General information
- Location: Clove Valley, Dutchess County, New York, United States of America
- Client: Roman Catholic Archdiocese of New York

The Chapel of Our Lady of Mercy is a former Roman Catholic parish church under the authority of the Roman Catholic Archdiocese of New York, located in Clove Valley, Dutchess County, New York. The parish was established in 1885 and closed c.1947.

By the 1880s, iron mines were operating at Clove and the Catholic families needed their own church since a trip of eight miles to St. Denis was a challenge, even if you owned a horse and wagon and many of the miners did not. In 1883 Father McSwiggan purchased one half acre in Clove. The chapel, named Our Lady of Mercy and seating about fifty at most, was erected, likely by the miners themselves by 1884. The Clove chapel, with its small steeple intact, stood on Dutchess Route 9 about 3.7 miles north of Route 55. Our Lady of Mercy at Clove was still functioning in 1945 according to the parish calendar for that year, but closed shortly after World War II.
