= St. Rita of Cascia - St. Pius V's Church (Bronx) =

Church building in New York, US

Coordinates: 40°48′47″N 73°55′8.4″W

The Parish of St. Rita of Cascia and of St. Pius V is a Roman Catholic parish under the authority of the Roman Catholic Archdiocese of New York. The church is located at 448 College Ave. in the Bronx.

== St Rita of Cascia ==
The parish was founded in 1900. Rita of Cascia was canonized on May 24, 1900, and Archbishop Corrigan decided to name the parish in honor of the new saint. The cornerstone was laid in November 1900 and the church was consecrated in October 1904. The first pastor was Rev. Charles Ferina D.D. He was assisted by Rev. Patrick Mannion and Rev. A.D. Cunion. During his tenure, Rev. Ferina founded an Italian mission at 150th St. and Morris Ave. that later became the parish of the Lady of Suffrage.

A residence of the Missionaries of Charity is located at St. Rita.

=== Pastors ===
- Fr. Charles Ferina, 1900-1909
- James P. O'Brien, 1910 -
- Fr. Joseph E. Bergan 1940-1947
- Fr. Pablo González 2012–present

== Merger ==
Effective August 1, 2015, the parish of St. Pius V merged with the parish of St. Rita of Cascia.

== St. Pius V ==
The Church of St. Pius V
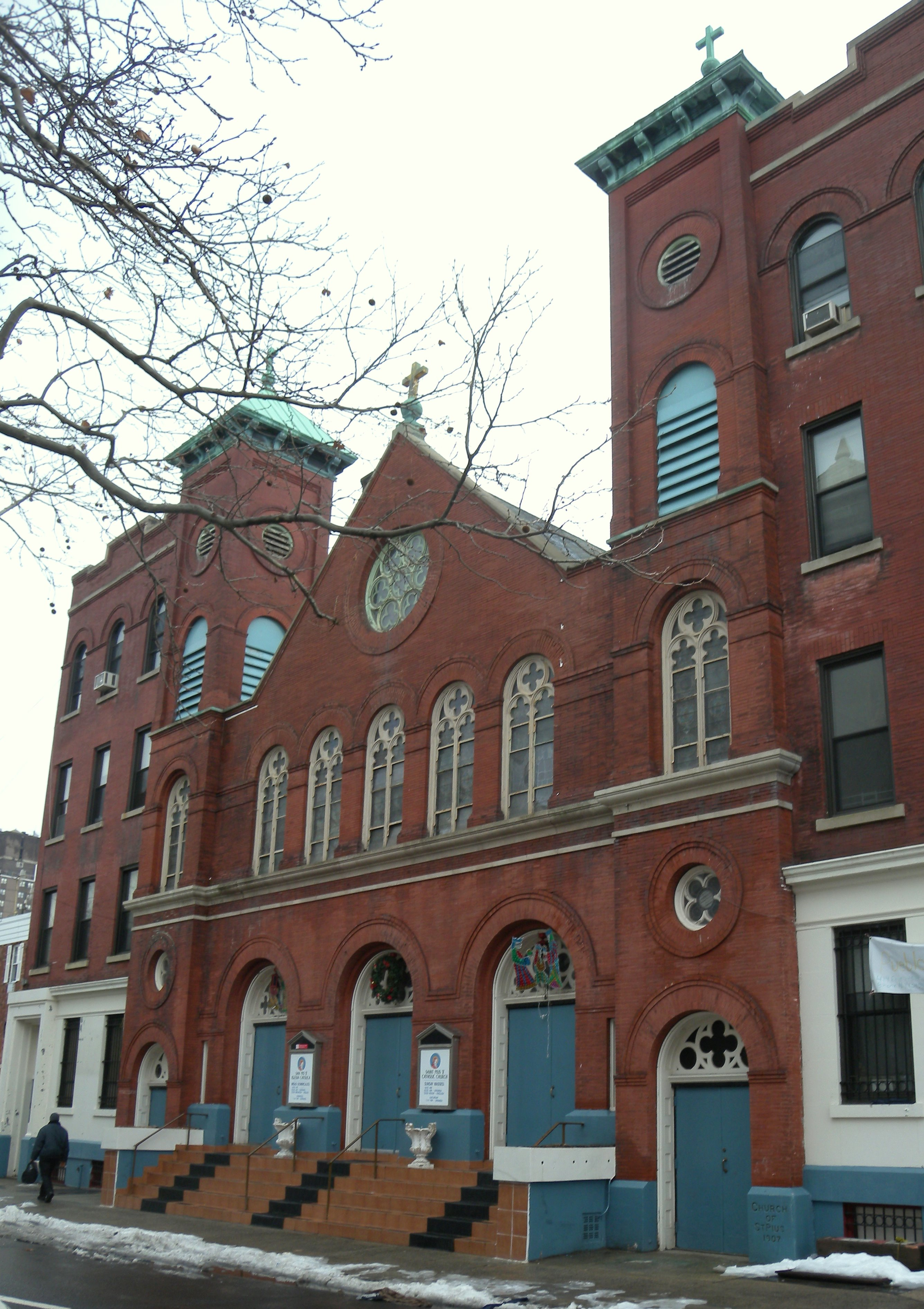
- Interactive map of the The Church of St. Pius V area

General information
- Location: Mott Haven, the Bronx, New York, United States
- Construction started: 1906
- Completed: 1907
- Client: Roman Catholic Archdiocese of New York

Technical details
- Structural system: Red brick masonry

Design and construction
- Architect: Anthony F. A. Schmitt

The Church of St. Pius V was a Roman Catholic parish church under the authority of the Roman Catholic Archdiocese of New York, located at 416-418, 420 East 145th Street, in the South Bronx neighborhood of the Bronx in New York City, in the U.S. state of New York. The parish was established in 1906, with Fr. Francis M. Fagan its first pastor. "A 'fine' parish school was opened September 1913.

=== Building ===
The red-brick church was built in 1906–1907 to the designs by Anthony F. A. Schmitt. The Romanesque building has two towers. Effective November 30, 2017, the St. Pius V church building was desacralized for secular use.

=== St. Pius V Girls' High School ===
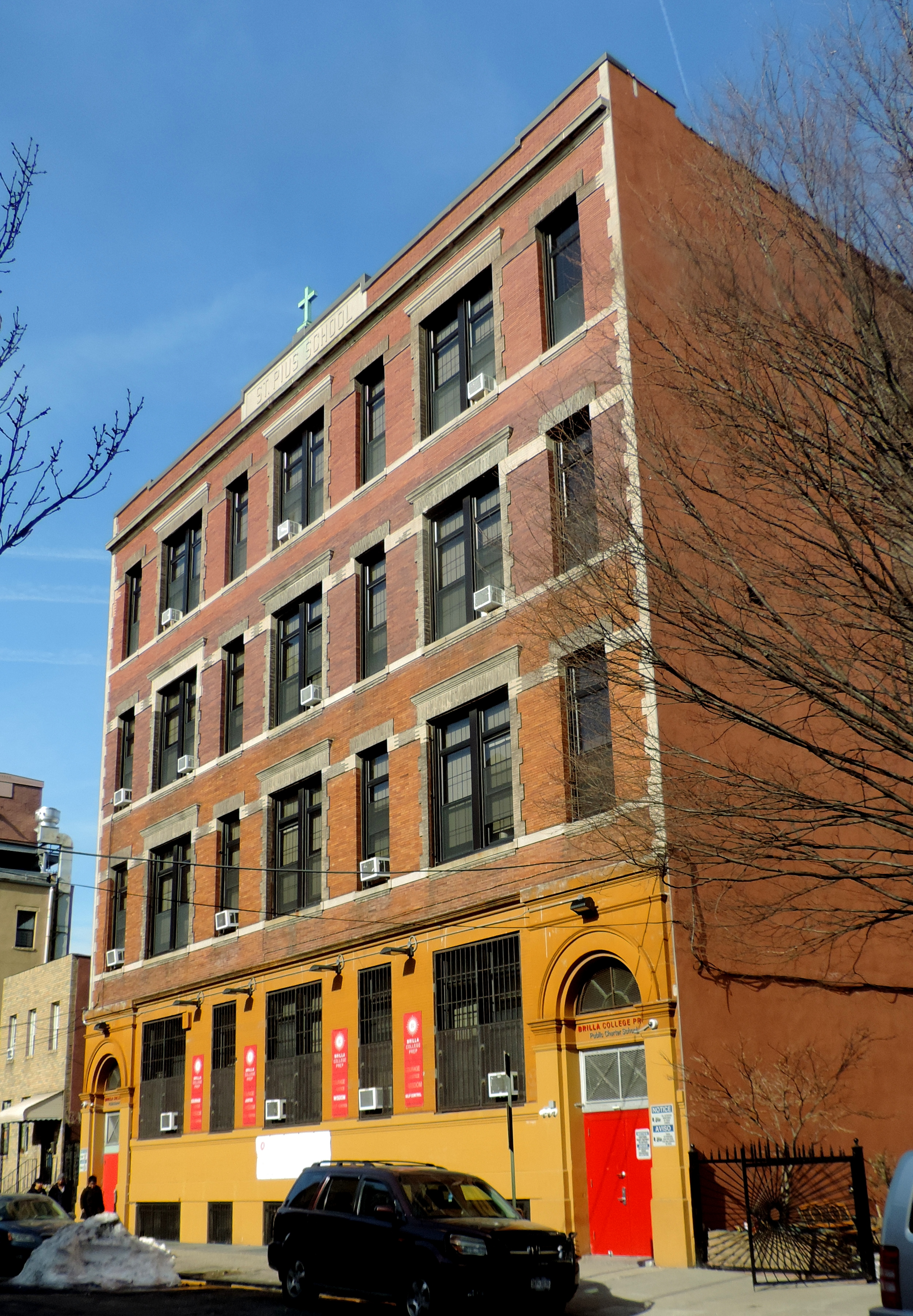
School

St. Pius V Girls' High School was opened in 1930 and closed effective June 2011.
