= St. Joseph Church (Chinatown, Manhattan) =

Catholic church in Manhattan, New York

Coordinates: 40.71161°N 73.99633°W

The Church of St. Joseph
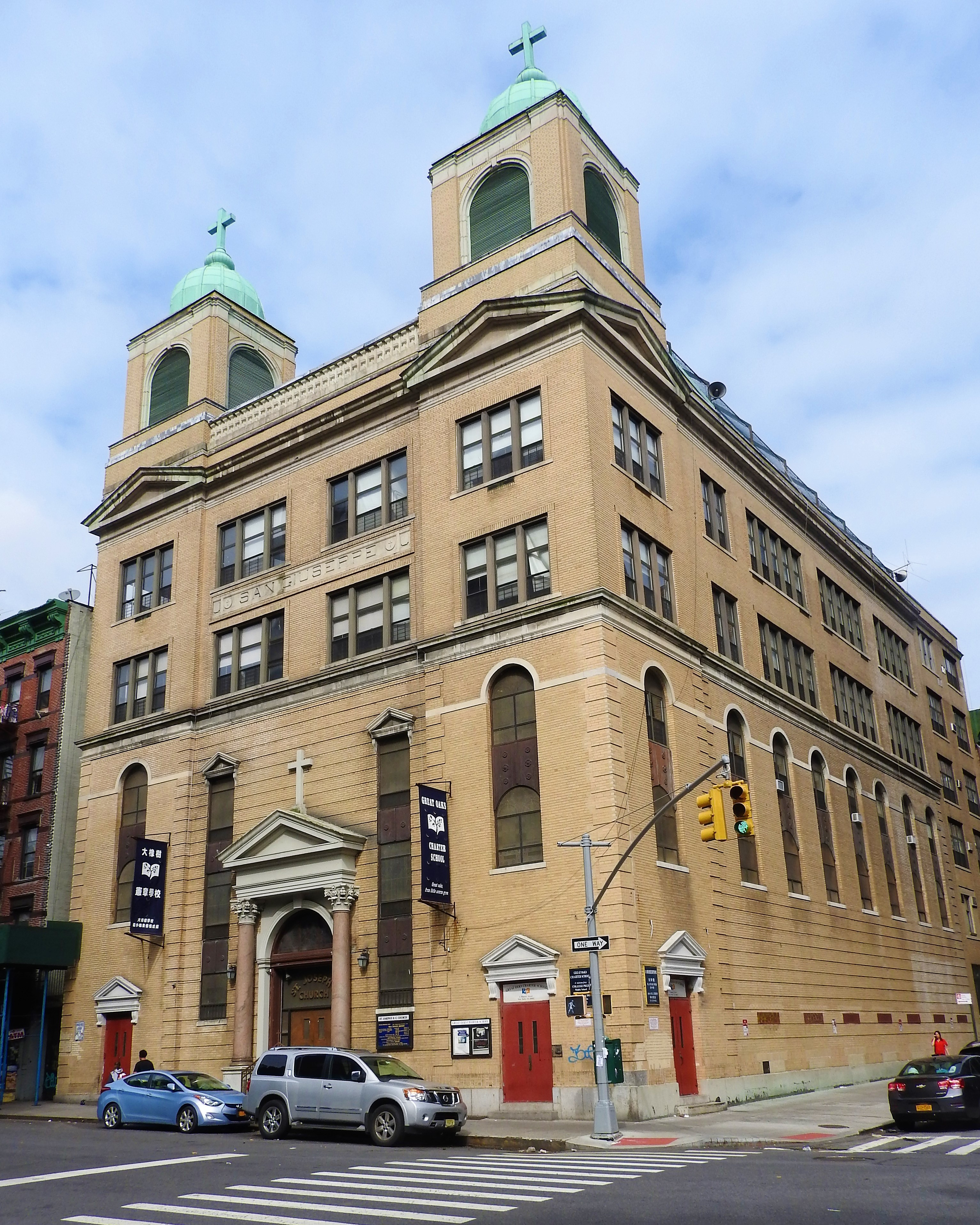
- The church in 2011
- Interactive map of the The Church of St. Joseph area

General information
- Architectural style: Italianate
- Location: Lower East Side, Manhattan, New York City, New York., United States of America
- Construction started: 1923
- Completed: 1924
- Client: Roman Catholic Archdiocese of New York

Design and construction
- Architect: Matthew W. Del Gaudio

The Church of St. Joseph is a former parish church of the Roman Catholic Archdiocese of New York, located at 5 Monroe Street in the neighborhoods of Chinatown and Two Bridges in Manhattan, New York City.

It is now administered by the Parish of Transfiguration and of St. James/St. Joseph. The Parish of St. Joseph had merged with the former neighboring Parish of St. Joachim in 1957. In 2007, it was merged again with the nearby Parish of St. James. Finally, in 2015, the parish was merged with the Church of the Transfiguration.

== Parish history ==
The parish was opened about 1923 by the Missionaries of St. Charles Borromeo, a religious congregation founded in 1887 by the Blessed John Baptist Scalabrini, a Catholic bishop in Italy who had become aware of the plight of his fellow countrymen who were emigrating to America to escape poverty. The cornerstone of the new church was laid in 1923 by the first pastor, the Rev. Vincent M. Januzzi. St. Joseph Parochial School opened in 1926, administered by the Apostles of the Sacred Heart of Jesus, a congregation of teaching sisters from Italy.

The Italian form of St. Joseph, San Giuseppe, is inscribed on the masonry and is used to distinguish this church from its more famous Manhattan neighbor, St. Joseph's Church in Greenwich Village, as well as from the other parishes in Manhattan dedicated to Saint Joseph. "Visible over the tenement scape of the Lower East Side are the twin domed towers of this Roman Catholic Sanctuary--San Giuseppe--at 5 Monroe Street, designed by Matthew W. Del Gaudio".

The Church and School of St. Joseph continued to serve the people of the inner city and immigrants, with Masses celebrated in three different languages: English, Spanish and Chinese. St. Joseph Parish was designated a national parish for both the Italian and Chinese populations of the area. Declining congregations and changing demographics prompted further reorganizations in the early 21st century. In 2007 it merged with the nearby Parish of St. James, and its school merged with St. James Elementary School. The combined Parish of St. Joseph/St. James was merged again with the Church of the Transfiguration in 2015, sparking objections from some members of its active, predominantly Chinese-American congregation.
