= St. Bernard's Chapel =

Church in Patterson, New York, United States

Coordinates: 41°28′30.3″N 73°36′42.7″W

The Chapel of St. Bernard

General information
- Location: Towners, Putnam County, New York, United States
- Client: Roman Catholic Archdiocese of New York

The Chapel of St. Bernard is a closed Roman Catholic parish church under the authority of the Roman Catholic Archdiocese of New York, located in Towners, Putnam County, New York, USA. The parish was established as a mission of St. Lawrence O'Toole in Brewster in 1875 and closed in 1957.
