= Church of St. Clement Mary Hofbauer =

Former church in Manhattan, New York

Coordinates: 40.7572°N 73.9942°W

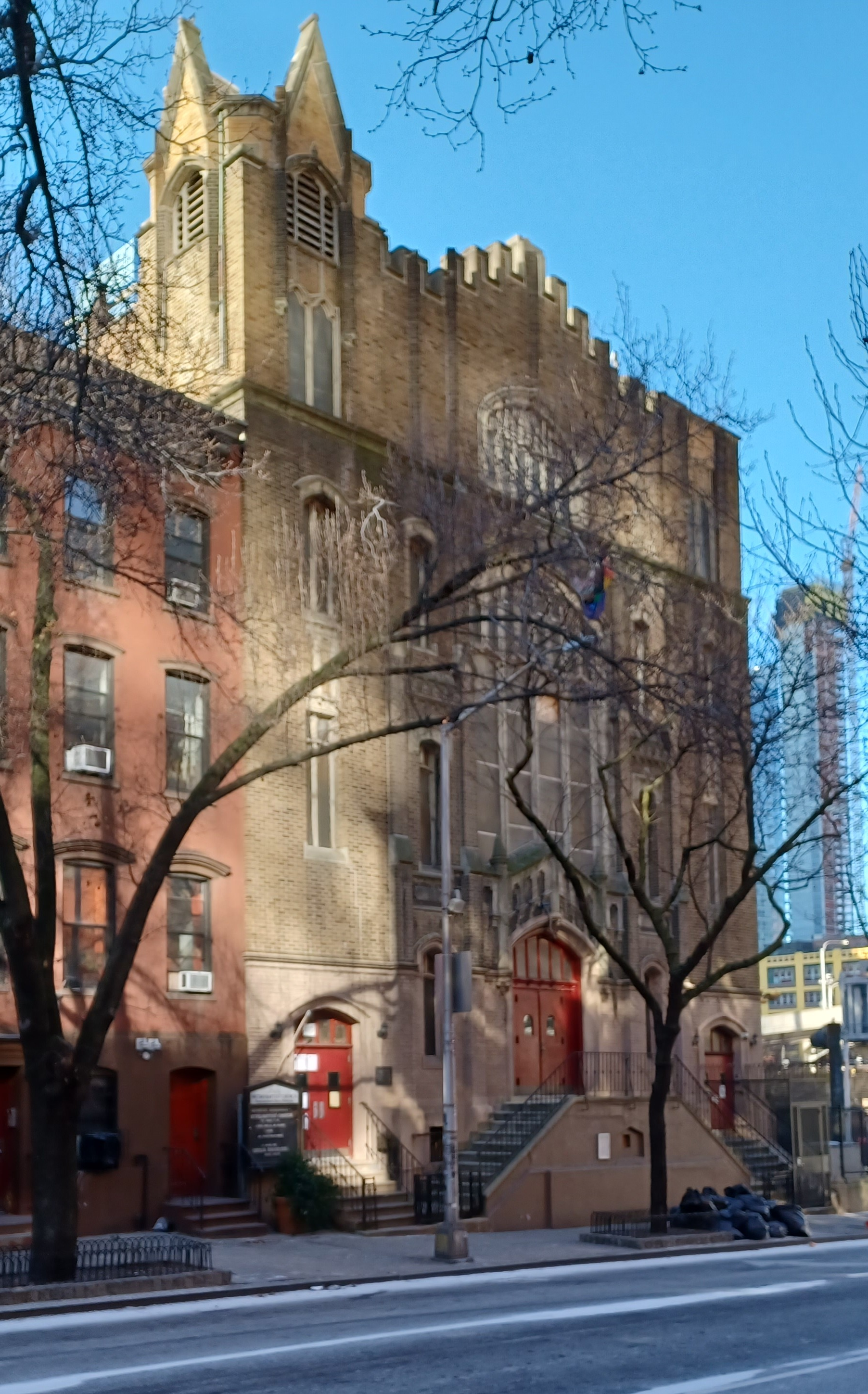
- Metro Baptist Church in 2022
- Church of St. Clement Mary Hofbauer
- Location: 406-412 West 40th Street, New York, New York
- Country: United States
- Denomination: Roman Catholic

History
- Status: closed
- Founded: 1909
- Founder: The Rev. J. Letanche
- Dedication: St. Clement Mary Hofbauer

Architecture
- Architect: Fred Schwartz
- Style: Gothic Revival
- Years built: 1910
- Closed: c.1970

Specifications
- Capacity: 750
- Metro Baptist Church
- U.S. Historic district – Contributing property
- Part of: Paddy's Market Historic District (ID100007686)
- Designated CP: April 28, 2022

The Church of St. Clement Mary Hofbauer was a parish church of the Roman Catholic Archdiocese of New York which was located in the Hell's Kitchen neighborhood of New York City. Founded in 1909, the parish was closed in the late 1960s. Since 1984, the church building has been occupied by Metro Baptist Church, a congregation affiliated with the Alliance of Baptists and the Cooperative Baptist Fellowship.

== History ==
In 1909, in an effort to meet the spiritual needs of the newly arrived Polish inhabitants of the west side of Manhattan, Cardinal John Farley, the Archbishop of New York, authorized the founding of a new parish to serve them. He authorized the Rev. J. Letanche, a native of Austrian Poland, to undertake this challenge.

The decision was made to place the new parish under the spiritual patronage of a newly canonized saint with strong ties to Poland, Clement Mary Hofbauer, C.Ss.R., who had been canonized earlier that same year.

The first mass was held in a candy store on November 14, 1909. Subsequent services were held in a rented Lutheran church, until Letrenche was able to purchase four adjacent lots on West 40th Street, at the corner of Tenth Avenue. Ground was broken and a four-story parish building was constructed, designed by Fred Schwartz, an architect based in Paterson, New Jersey.

The church, which could seat 750, was located on the first floor of the building, over which was the parish school, which was staffed by the Sisters of the Resurrection, a religious congregation which was founded to serve the Polish people, whose convent was over the school. In its early years, the congregation numbered about 3,000 people.

With the gradual change of neighborhood demographics to a more affluent population in the mid-20th century, the congregation dwindled to the point where the parish was closed by the archdiocese by 1970.
