= St. Joachim's Church (Manhattan) =

Demolished church in Manhattan, New York

The Church of St. Joachim
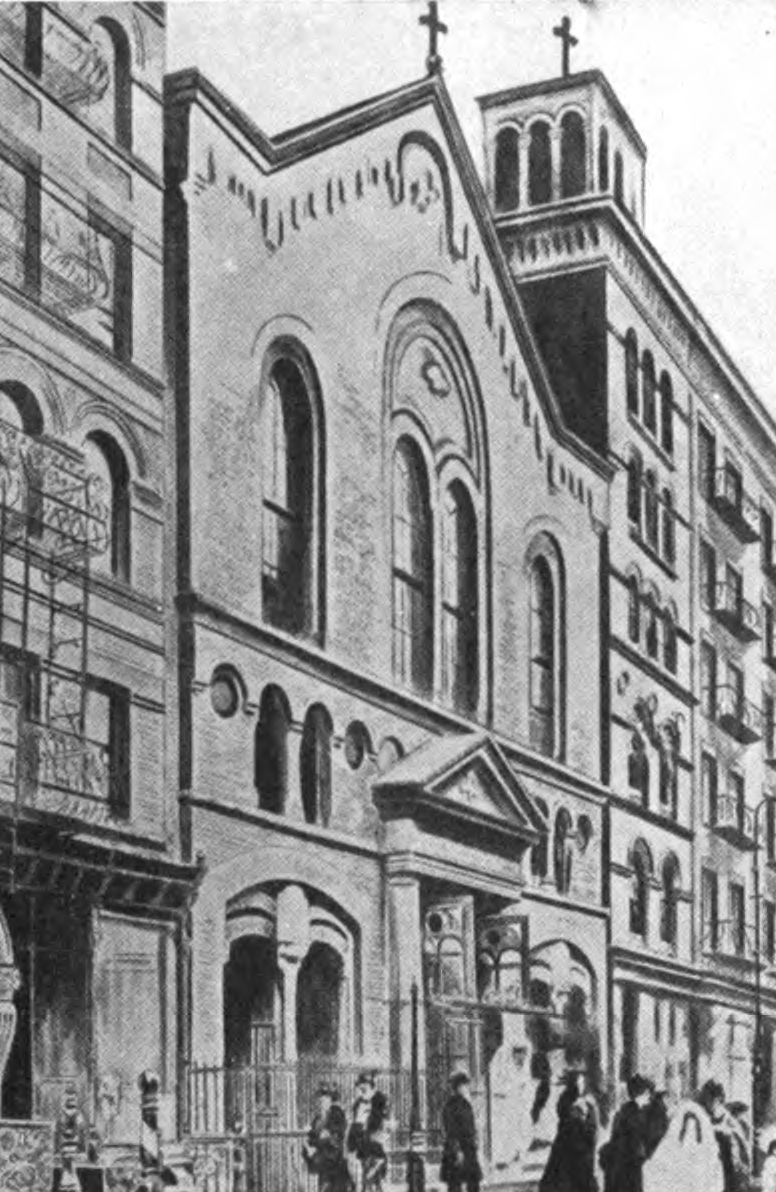
- St. Joachim Church (around 1914)
- Interactive map of the The Church of St. Joachim area

General information
- Architectural style: Victorian; Italianate; Romanesque Revival
- Location: Manhattan, New York, United States of America
- Coordinates: 40°42′45″N 73°59′59″W
- Completed: 1888
- Demolished: 1959
- Cost: $158,000
- Client: Archdiocese of New York

The Church of St. Joachim was a Catholic parish church under the authority of the Archdiocese of New York, located at 26 Roosevelt Street, in Manhattan, New York City.

The parish was established in 1888 by the Missionary Fathers of St. Charles Borromeo, with the Rev. F. Morelli, C.S.C.B., as its first pastor. It was the first national parish in the United States founded for Italians, who had previously had to worship in the basements of the Catholic churches made up of Irish-American congregants. The total debt of the property was $158,000.

Because of the increased parish numbers, the Rev. Vincent Jannuzzi, C.S.C.B., founded St. Rocco's Chapel at 18 Catherine Slip as a mission chapel of St. Joachim Parish, as well as the Madonna Day Nursery on Cherry Street, which opened in 1910 and was staffed by the Sisters of Our Lady of Christian Doctrine. The 1913-1914 parish statistics listed 1,000 baptisms, 250 marriages and 400 confirmations.

The parish had a brief connection with Mother Cabrini, who was helped by the Scalabrini Missionaries upon her arrival in the United States in 1889. The Missionary Sisters of the Sacred Heart of Jesus, whom she had founded, were the first teachers at the St. Joachim parish school when it was opened. They withdrew from the school in 1892.

St. Joachim's was home to the St. Rocco Society, founded in 1889 by immigrants from Potenza. The society's hand crafted statue of St. Rocco from Italy was housed at St. Joachim's. Every year the Society celebrated Saint Rocco's Feast with a procession. After the demolition of Saint Joachim's Church due to urban renewal, the statue was moved to Saint Joseph's Church on Monroe Street and the celebration continued there. With the closing in 2015 of St. Joseph's, the statue and Feast was moved to Most Precious Blood Church at 113 Baxter Street, where it is held today.

== Building ==
The midblock gabled brick Victorian Italianate church with Romanesque details "in the Roman style" was designed with a seating capacity of 800.

In 1914, the parish consisted of 18,000 Italian immigrants and second-generation Italian-Americans. The church owned three buildings then, of which one it had planned to turn into a parochial school. The Romanesque church tower, built 1888, at 22 Roosevelt Street "was a harbinger for Judson Memorial Church".

== Closing ==
By 1957 the City of New York had decided to build a housing development on Park Row as part of its urban renewal program. They acquired a six-block area for this project, which included the parish property, and the church was torn down in 1959. The parish was merged by the Archdiocese of New York with the nearby St. Joseph's Church, founded by the Scalabrini Fathers around 1923, with Father Januzzi as the first pastor.
