= Greenwood Clean Energy =

American manufacturer of wood and biomass heating systems

Greenwood Clean Energy, Inc.
- Company type: Private
- Industry: Heating system manufacturing
- Founded: 2009
- Headquarters: Redmond, Washington
- Key people: Michael Kuehner, CEO; German Burtscher, EVP; Craig Butler, MD
- Products: Greenwood Frontier Series
- Website: www.greenwoodusa.com

Greenwood Clean Energy, Inc. is an American manufacturing company headquartered in Redmond, Washington, that manufactures wood and biomass central heating systems.

== History ==
The company was founded in 2009. A year later, the Clean Energy Company (CEC) acquired the Greenwood brand, certain assets, and intellectual property of Greenwood Technologies. CEC became Greenwood Clean Energy, Inc. and began marketing its appliances under the Greenwood brand.

== Emissions ==
Greenwood has participated with the U.S. Environmental Protection Agency to advocate for the use of more efficient wood boilers. Greenwood Clean Energy's Frontier CX heating appliance meets the requirements for efficiency and emissions outlined in the Washington State Department of Ecology standards of less than 4.5 grams of particulate matter per hour using the Douglas Fir test fuel.

== Awards ==
Greenwood has received numerous awards, including:

- 2008 Reader's Choice Award, Contractor magazine;
- Plumbing & Mechanical magazine;
- 2007 Brilliant Innovation Award, Discover Brilliant International Conference;
- 2007 AHR Expo Innovation Award, AHR Expo; and
- 2006 Vesta Award: Groundbreaking Advancement in Renewable Fuel Heating, Hearth and Home.
