= William Sloane Coffin Sr. =

American merchant (1879–1933)

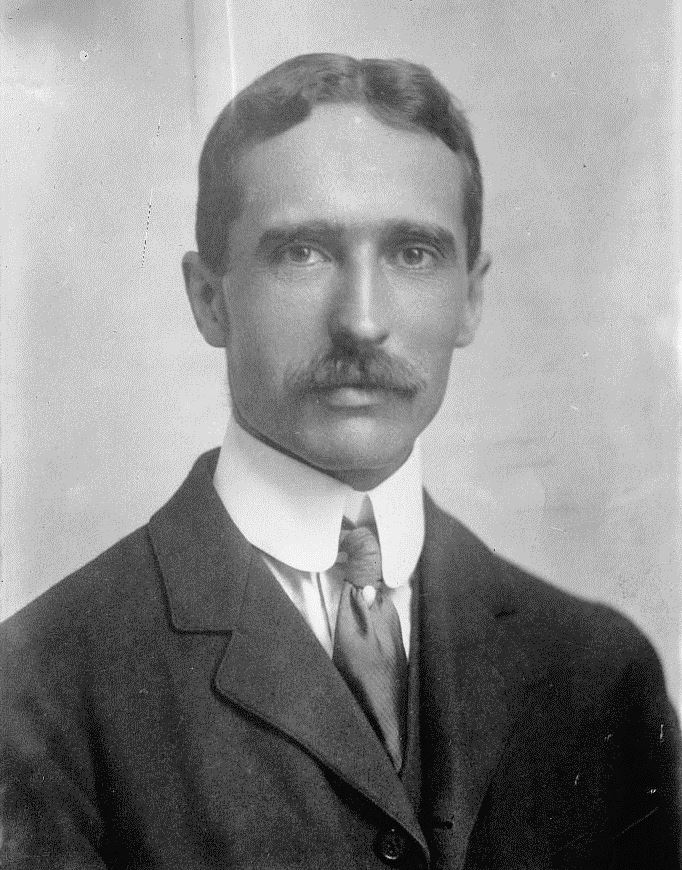

President of the Board of Trustees of the Metropolitan Museum of Art
- In office December 22, 1931 – December 16, 1933
- Preceded by: Robert Weeks de Forest
- Succeeded by: George Blumenthal

Personal details
- Born: April 15, 1879 Manhattan, New York, U.S.
- Died: December 16, 1933 (aged 54) Manhattan, New York, U.S.
- Spouse: Catherine Butterfield (m. 1920)
- Children: William Sloane Coffin Jr.
- Relatives: Henry Sloane Coffin (brother); William Douglas Sloane (uncle)
- Education: Yale College

William Sloane Coffin Sr. (April 15, 1879 – December 16, 1933) was an American businessman. He was a director, and later vice-president of W. & J. Sloane Company, his family's business, which was founded by his grandfather, William Sloane, from Kilmarnock, Scotland. He became president of the board of trustees of the Metropolitan Museum of Art, and founded the Hearth and Home Corporation to provide housing in downtown Manhattan, New York City.

== Early life ==
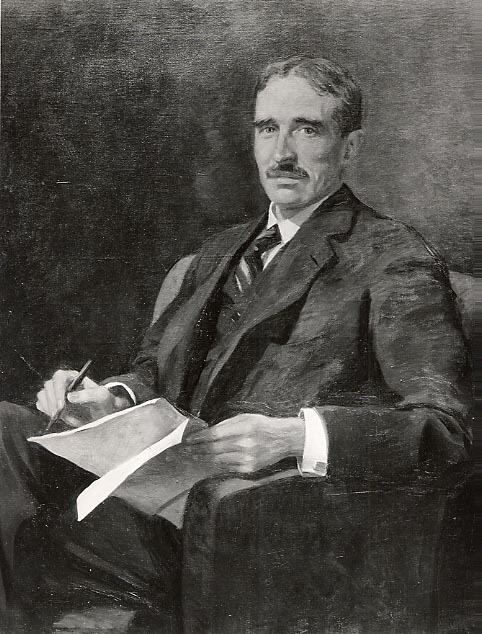
Posthumous portrait of Coffin by Ellen Emmet Rand, 1934

Coffin was born on April 15, 1879, in Manhattan, New York City to Edmund Coffin Jr. and Euphemia Sloane. His brother was Henry Sloane Coffin. He graduated from Yale College with a BA in 1900 and an MA in 1904.

== Career ==
Coffin was a director of the family's furniture and rug business, W. & J. Sloane Company, and later its vice-president. He was elected a trustee of the Metropolitan Museum of Art in 1924, and in 1931 became president of the board of trustees.

W. & J. Sloane acquired the California Furniture Company, and in 1925 Coffin created a subsidiary, the Company of Master Craftsmen, to make Colonial Revival furniture in a factory in Flushing, Queens. Sloane was heavily involved in manufacturing and selling this style, and had another subsidiary, the Oneidacraft Company in Oneida, New York, which made it as well.

Coffin was involved in purchasing real estate properties from Trinity Church and redeveloping them. These houses are now located in the Charlton-King-Vandam Historic District. He founded the Hearth and Home Corporation, of which he was president, in order to renovate older buildings near downtown Manhattan to provide housing for middle-class New Yorkers, which Coffin saw as a solution to the "apartment house problem" of the late 1910s and early 1920s.

In 1920, Hearth and Home purchased the entire block of mid-19th century row houses bounded by MacDougal, Sullivan, West Houston and Bleecker Streets and renovated those on MacDougal and Sullivan into spacious apartments, with the backyards of the buildings connected to form a common garden. The New York Times said about the project on January 30, 1921, that "[Coffin's] development made a real contribution to the solution of the housing problem and is an excellent example of what can be done to other properties in the city, and the rehabilitation of homey old buildings." The buildings were sold to individual owners in 1924, but with covenants guaranteeing aesthetic continuity and no future redevelopment of the site. These houses now make up the MacDougal-Sullivan Gardens Historic District.

== Personal life ==
On September 14, 1920, he married Catherine Butterfield in Barnstable, Massachusetts. Together, they had a son:

- William Sloane Coffin Jr. (1924–2006), who became a clergyman and a noted peace activist.

Coffin died on December 16, 1933, at his home in Manhattan, New York City from a coronary thrombosis.

== See also ==
- Charlton-King-Vandam Historic District
- MacDougal-Sullivan Gardens Historic District
