= Hudson Square =

Neighborhood in New York City

Coordinates: 40.7268°N 74.0060°W

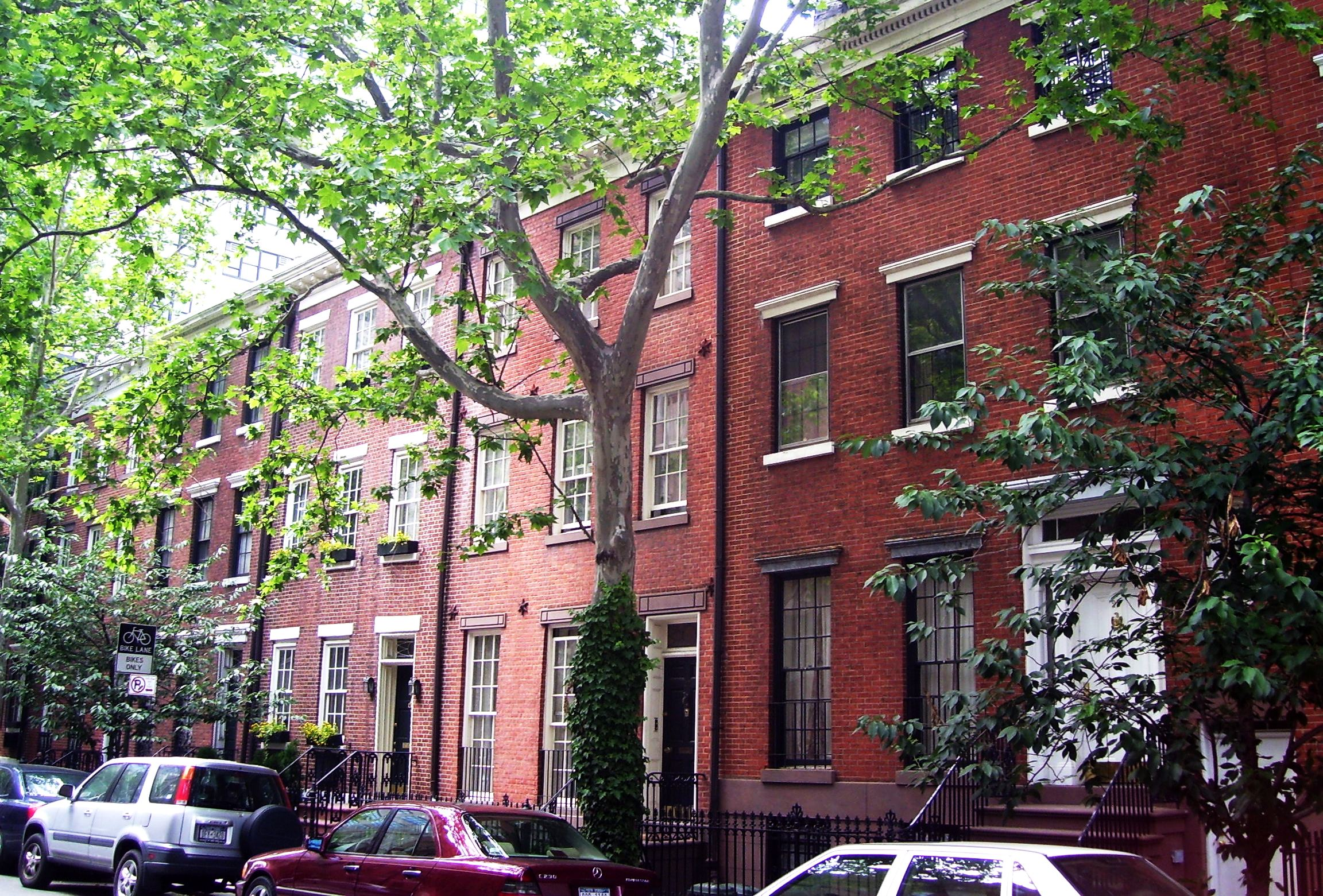
Federal style houses, c.1820, on Charlton Street in the Charlton–King–Vandam Historic District

Hudson Square is a neighborhood in Lower Manhattan in New York City. It is bounded approximately by Clarkson Street to the north, Canal Street to the south, Varick Street to the east, and the Hudson River to the west. To the north of the neighborhood is Greenwich Village, to the south is TriBeCa, and to the east are the South Village and SoHo. The area, once the site of the colonial property named Richmond Hill, became known in the 20th century as the Printing District, and into the 21st century it remains a center of media-related activity, including in advertising, design, communications, and the arts.

Within the neighborhood is the landmarked Charlton–King–Vandam Historic District, which contains the largest concentration of Federalist and Greek Revival style row houses built during the first half of the 19th century. The most prominent feature within the neighborhood is the Manhattan entrance to the Holland Tunnel. The current tallest structure in the neighborhood is the Dominick condo hotel.

== History ==
When George Washington led the defense of New York against the British in 1776, his headquarters were located at Abraham Mortier's estate, Richmond Hill, on a rise southwest of what is now Charlton and Varick Streets. One of the earliest known uses of the term "New Yorker" in a published work is found in a letter that he wrote from Lower Manhattan. Previously, it had been the headquarters of Lord Jeffrey Amherst during the French and Indian War. Later, it was the residence of Sir John Temple, the first British ambassador to the United States, Vice President John Adams, Aaron Burr, who set off from Richmond Hill for the duel with Alexander Hamilton, was foreclosed on by the bank Burr had founded, and sold to John Jacob Astor who broke it up into parcels.

The neighborhood was home to the first African-American newspaper in the United States, called Freedom's Journal, edited by John Russwurm and Samuel Cornish from March 16, 1827 to March 28, 1829. The newspaper provided international, national, and regional information on current events and contained editorials declaiming against slavery, lynching, and other injustices.

An English visitor, Fanny Trollope, in her 1832 book Domestic Manners of the Americans, wrote of her impressions of Hudson Square at that time (from 1803 to 1866 Hudson Square was a private park to the south of today's Hudson Square, eventually known as Saint John's Park. It was sold to Vanderbilt in 1866 for a freight terminal, and in 1927 became the exit plaza for the Holland tunnel):

Hudson Square and its neighbourhood is, I believe, the most fashionable part of the town; the square is beautiful, excellently well planted with a great variety of trees, and only wanting our frequent and careful mowing to make it equal to any square in London. The iron railing which surrounds this enclosure is as high and as handsome as that of the Tuilleries, and it will give some idea of the care bestowed on its decoration, to know that the gravel for the walks was conveyed by barges from Boston, not as ballast, but as freight.

Trinity Wall Street owns substantial commercial real estate in Hudson Square.

In 2013, the neighborhood was re-zoned to allow taller buildings. In July 2018, The Walt Disney Company announced plans to move its New York headquarters and operations to Four Hudson Square in a 99-year development deal, on land owned by Trinity, with construction scheduled to begin in 2020. The complex – consisting of two 320-foot (98 m) towers with – was expected to open in 2024. Subsequently, in December 2018, Google announced that it would construct a $1 billion, 1,700,000-square-foot (160,000 m^{2}) headquarters across three buildings in Hudson Square, supplementing its existing location at 111 Eighth Avenue in Chelsea, by 2020. Google also purchased 550 Washington Street in 2021, a former freight rail terminal in Hudson Square since converted into an office building. Other companies located in the Hudson Square area include Warby Parker (eyeglasses), Oscar Health (health insurance), and Harry's (razors).

== Points of interest ==
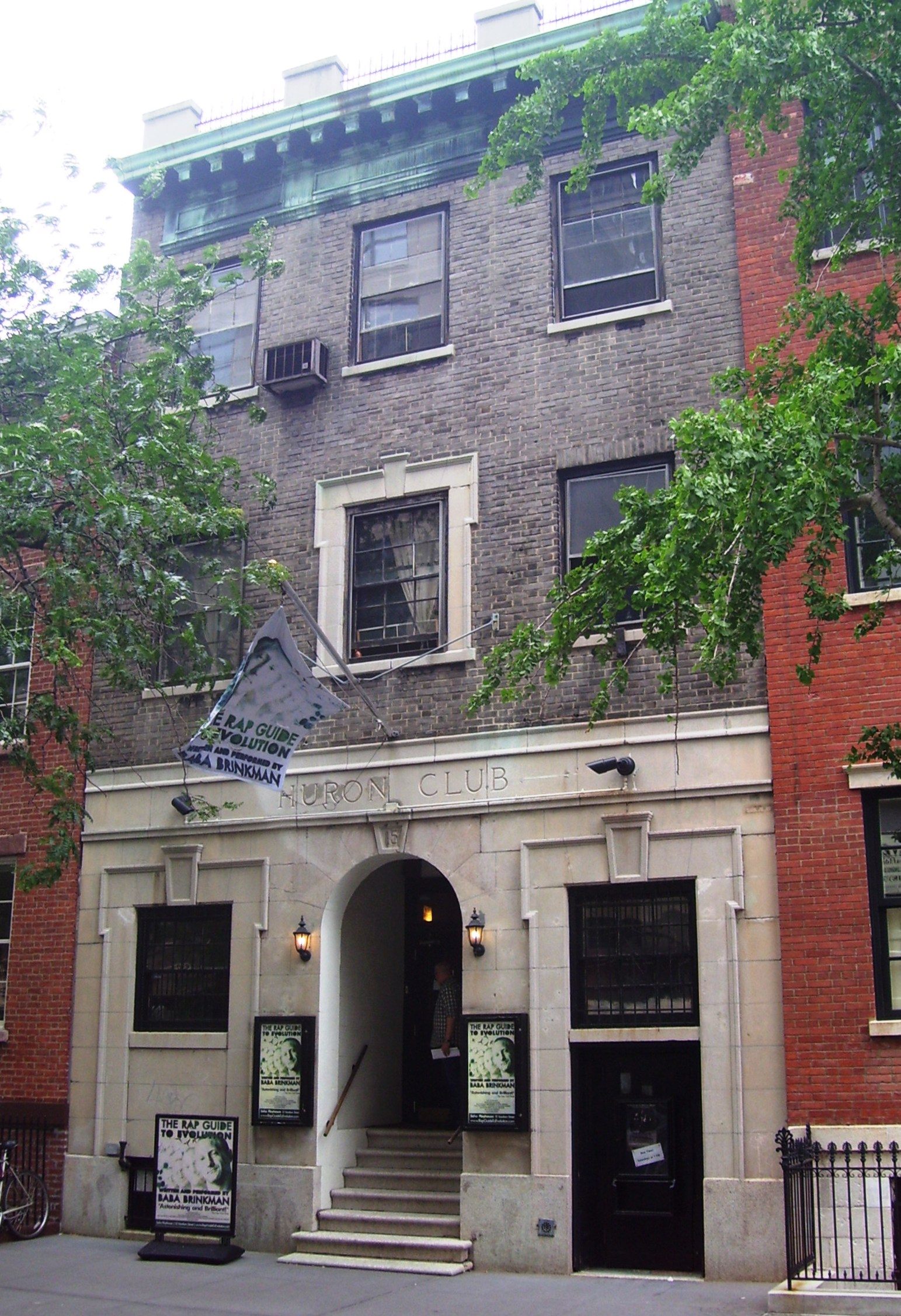
The SoHo Playhouse

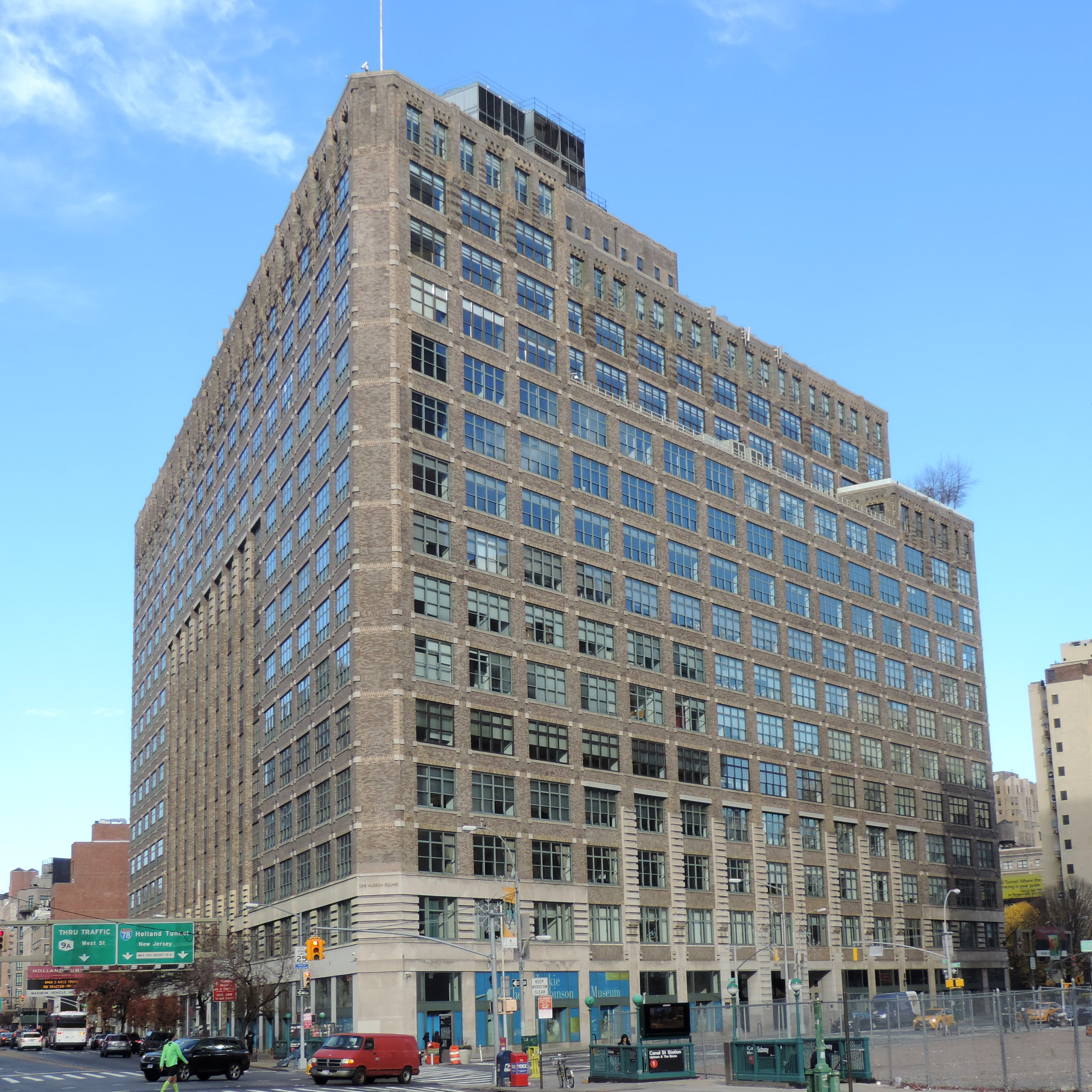
One Hudson Square, at Canal and Varick Streets

- The Ear Inn is one of the oldest bars in New York City, said to have been established in 1817, built by George Washington's aide. During Prohibition it was a speakeasy, but afterwards it had no name. It was known as "The Green Door" to sailors and longshoremen. In 1977, new resident-owners renamed it the Ear Inn, a name chosen to avoid the New York City Landmarks Preservation Commission's lengthy review of any new sign. The neon "BAR" sign was painted to read EAR, after Ear Magazine, which was published upstairs.
- The Holland Tunnel was the longest underwater tunnel in the world at the time of its opening. It officially opened at midnight on November 13, 1927. It is still a heavily used Hudson River crossing.
- The New York City Fire Museum is located on 278 Spring Street between Hudson and Varick Streets.
- The Paradise Garage was a discotheque notable in the history of modern dance and pop music, as well as LGBT and nightclub cultures located at 84 King Street.
- The SoHo Playhouse at 15 Vandam Street stands on land that was once Richmond Hill, a colonial mansion that served as headquarters for General George Washington and later home to Aaron Burr. Purchased from Burr in 1817, the land was then developed into federalist-style row houses by fur magnate John Jacob Astor. 15 Van Dam Street was designated at the Huron Club, a popular meeting house and night club for the Democratic Party. The turn of the century brought the Tammany Hall machine to the Huron Club. Prominent regulars included "Battery" Dan Finn and the infamous Mayor Jimmy "Beau James" Walker. The main floor was transformed into a theater in the 1920s, and in the 1960s operated as the Village South, home to Playwrights Unit Workshop under the direction of Edward Albee. The playhouse now serves as a 199-seat off-Broadway venue.
- Steinway & Sons was founded in 1853 by German immigrant Henry Engelhard Steinway in a Manhattan loft on Varick Street.
- New York Public Radio has studios and offices at 160 Varick Street.
- WQXR's concert venue, the Greene Space, is located at 44 Charlton Street.

== Transportation ==
The New York City Subway's Spring Street (C and E trains) and Houston Street (1 train) stations serve the neighborhood, as do the M20, M21 and M55 buses.

== See also ==
- South Village
