= Minetta Creek =

Buried stream in Manhattan, New York

Coordinates: 40.7299°N 74.0013°W

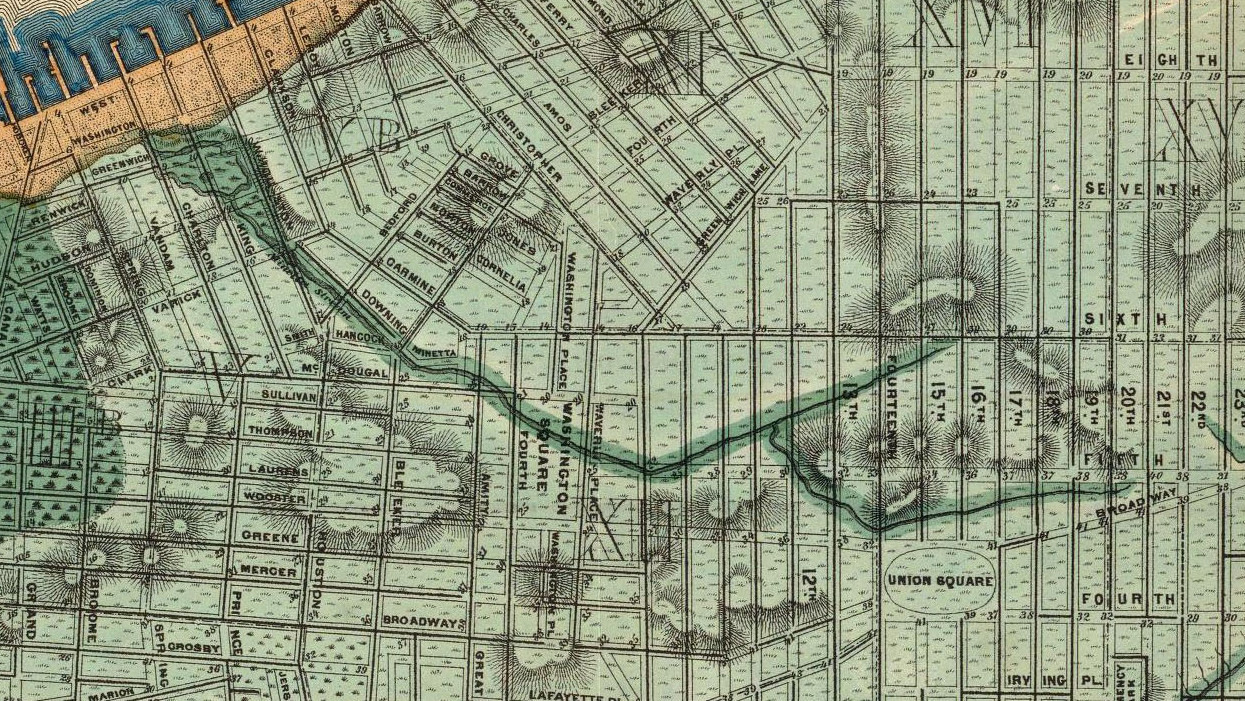
Sanitary & Topographical Map of the City and Island of New York (1865) by Egbert Ludovicus Viele shows the path of Minetta Creek with the then-current street grid superimposed.

Minetta Creek was one of the largest natural watercourses in Manhattan, New York City, United States. Minetta Creek was fed from two tributaries, one originating at Fifth Avenue and 21st Street, and the other originating at Sixth Avenue and 16th Street. They joined near Fifth Avenue and 11th Street then took a southwesterly course. Minetta Creek's name is thought to have originated from either the Native American term "Manette", meaning "Devil's Water", or the Dutch word "Minnetje", meaning "the little one".

Minetta Creek was originally known by the Dutch as Bestevaer's Killetje. During the 18th century, large amounts of wildlife could be seen around the creek. In the early 1820s, the New York City common council commissioned a project to divert Minetta Creek into a covered sewer. The creek was filled in by the mid-19th century, although it persisted as an underground stream through the 20th century.

Ever since the creek was covered in the 19th century, there have been debates over whether the creek still exists. Minetta Creek caused flooding in basements and construction sites from the mid-19th century through the mid-20th century. Pools of water were also found at several construction sites along the creek's course.

== Course ==
Minetta Creek was one of Manhattan's largest natural waterways. (Note: "Sources of Great Danger; Underground Streams as Breeders of Contagion" (PDF). The New York Times. January 17, 1892. Compare with the Great Kill that ran through what is now Times Square; as well as Saw Kill.) Nearly 2 miles (3.2 km) long, Minetta Creek began from two tributaries, the main one having its source (Note: According to Charles Homer Haswell, it is "near the site of the Union Club". The Union Club premises until 1903 were at Fifth Avenue and 21st Street.) near Fifth Avenue and 21st Street, and a secondary one that had its source at Sixth Avenue and 16th Street. The streams flowed southward and joined within the block bound by 11th and 12th Streets between Fifth and Sixth Avenues. From there it flowed southward across modern-day Washington Square Park. It then crossed southwest along the present route of Minetta Lane, one of the creek's namesake streets. The creek then roughly followed the current path of Minetta Street, a one-block road going south from Minetta Lane before curving southwest to meet Sixth Avenue. Minetta Creek then turned west along what is now Downing Street and eventually discharged into the Hudson River near Charlton Street.

== Origins of name ==
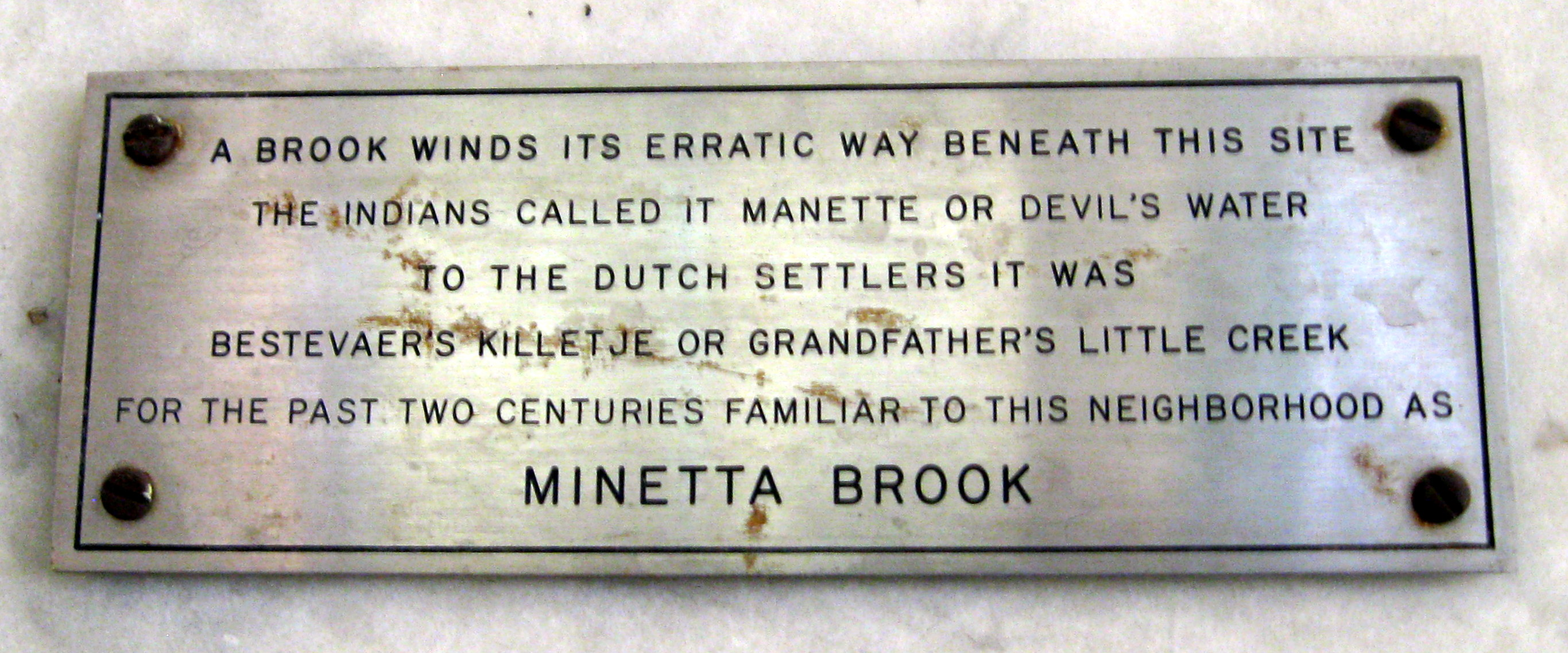
Plaque on the building at Two Fifth Avenue in honor of Minetta Creek

Minetta Creek is alternatively called Minetta Brook, Minetta Stream, Minetta Water, or Minetta Waters. It was also referred to by its Dutch name, Bestevaer's Killetje, before the American Revolutionary War. A plaque affixed to the building at Two Fifth Avenue provides one derivation of the "Minetta" name and reads as follows:

A brook winds its erratic way beneath this site

The Indians called it Manette or Devil's Water

To the Dutch settlers it was

Bestevaer's Killetje or Grandfather's Little Creek

For the past two centuries familiar to this neighborhood as

Minetta Brook

Another theory is that the name is an Anglicization of the Dutch root "min" or "minuut" (English: little) and suffix "-tje" to produce "Minnetje" or "The little one" to distinguish it from the Groot Kill, a large creek that was a mile away. However, 'min' in Dutch does not translate to "little"; in modern Dutch, it translates to "minus" or "less".

== Colonial days ==
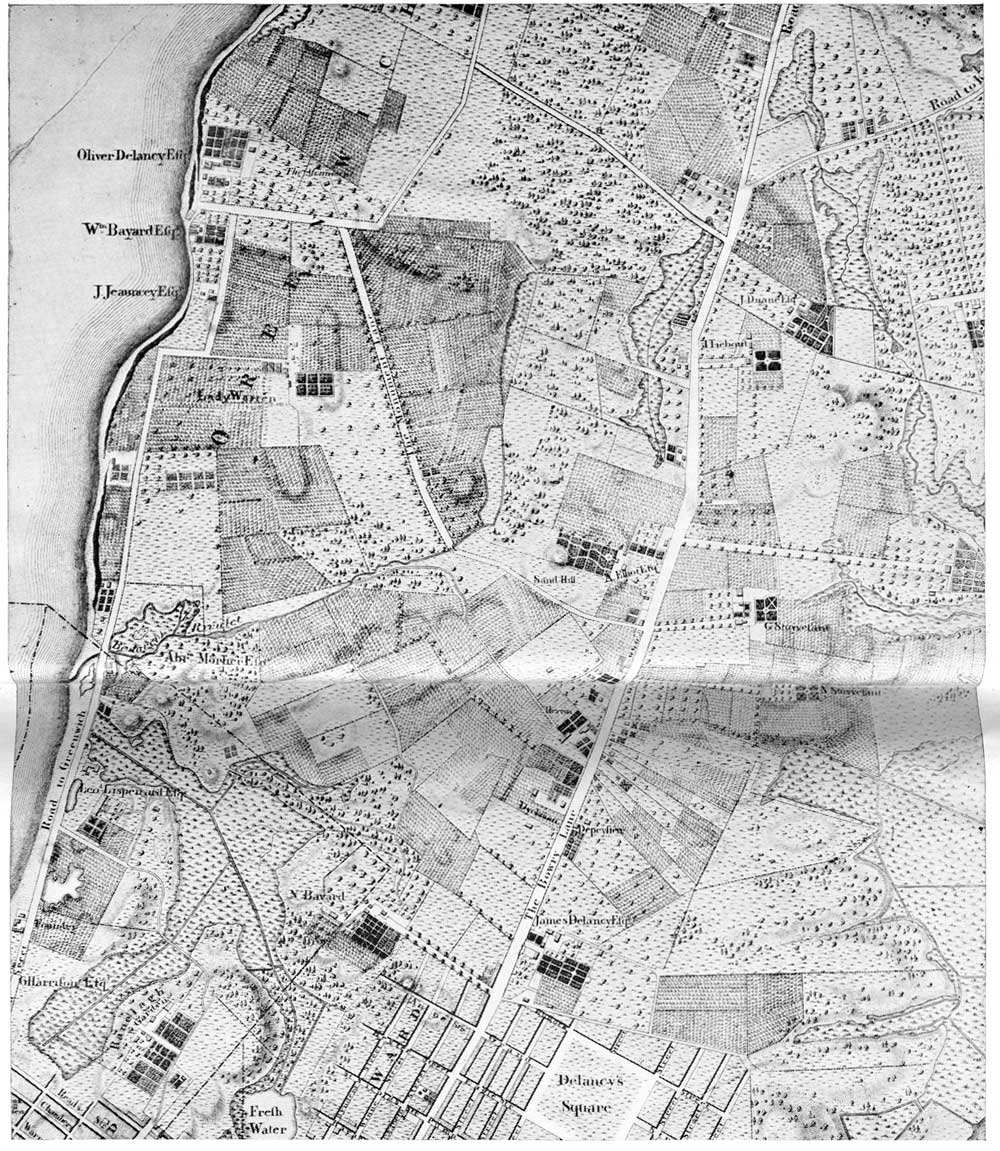
On a section of Bernard Ratzer's map of New York and its suburbs, made circa 1766, Minetta Creek is labeled "Bestavaer's Rivulet" and may be seen in high resolution, exiting into the Hudson River on the left edge about halfway up in the area labeled, "Abe Mortier Est.,", below Lady Warren's estate

In the Dutch era, the area surrounding the creek was known as the Land of the Blacks and settled by freed Africans. A path along the creek, called the "Negroes' Causeway", later formed the hub of the Little Africa neighborhood and now follows part of the route of Minetta Street.

The creek, whose course formed a well-defined channel, was known for its abundance of fish, in particular trout. Pickerel, bass, and pike were among the species fished in it. "All manner of wild fowl" including ducks and geese could be found in the creek. In fact, the filling-in had preceded real-estate speculators' infill operations, according to the British Headquarters Map of c. 1782–1783. At the time, the British carried out extensive defenses of the city, and according to ecologist Eric W. Sanderson, "they dammed Minetta Water to create a lake in what is now the West Village".

Bestevaer's Killetje formed a convenient landmark designation for surveyors. Murray Hoffman's Treatise Upon the Estate and Rights of the Corporation of the City of New York, as Proprietors reprints numerous historical documents from the seventeenth and eighteenth centuries, a number of which mention Minetta Creek. Most of these pre-nineteenth century documents refer to the creek by its Dutch name, Bestavaer's Killtjie (or, in a more probable spelling, Bestevaer's Killetje). One of the most significant of pre-American Revolutionary War documents consolidating ownership of land in Manhattan was the Montgomerie Charter, named after governor John Montgomerie, dated January 15, 1730, and ratified by the Colonial Legislature in 1732. It stated in part:

... [A]ll that space of ground and soil of the Hudson river, now lying and being under the water of the same river, to begin at a certain place near high water mark at the south end of a piece of upland, which lies between the said river and a piece of meadow ground or marsh, being the first piece of meadow ground or marsh near Hudson river to the southward of Greenwich, and from whence the above named run of water called Bestaver's Killetjie or rivulet runs into Hudson's river, from which place of beginning, to extend or run to the south side of the street which runs from the parade before our fort in New York to the Hudson's river, south eighteen degrees thirty minutes west, on a straight line; the distance being one hundred and twenty-five chains [i.e. 8,250 feet (2,510 m) or 1.417 miles (2.280 km)], from which line to run a perpendicular breadth of, and to comprehend four hundred feet [120 metres] from low water mark into Hudson's river.

The Land Ordinance of 1796 – a U.S. federal cadastral survey done for purposes of taxation, also reprinted by Hoffman – laid out the line of West Street, which had been built over landfill. The survey took note of three particular locations. The first was a point 150 feet (46 m) north of Greenwich Street "from the center of the arch or bridge over Bestaver's Killtjie." Hoffman added a note: "Bestaver's Killtjie was afterward known as the Minetta Brook, and crossed Greenwich street in the vicinity of Charlton Street." He concluded his note by stating that this geographic point was represented in an 1807 map made by Charles Loss.

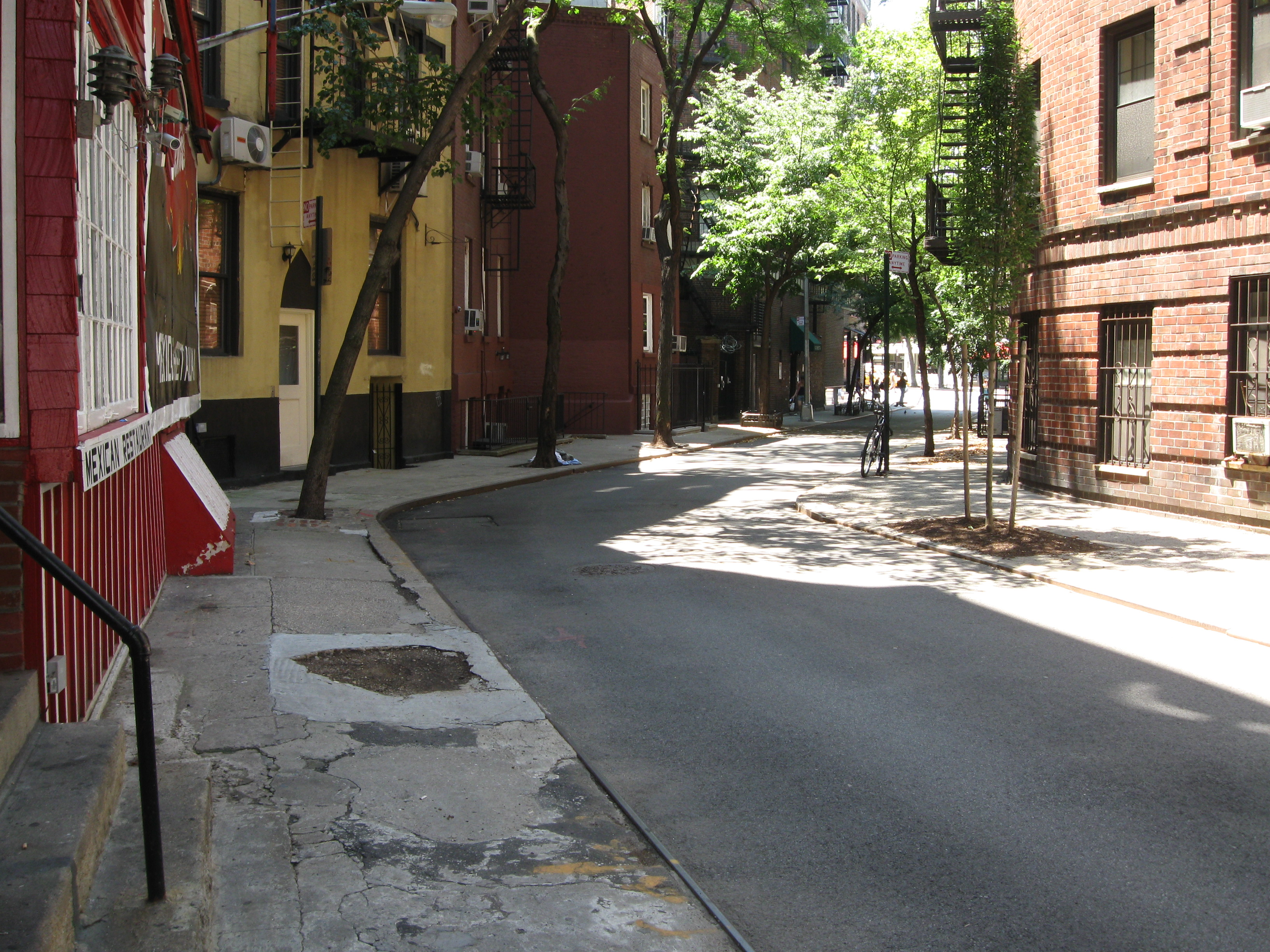
View of Minetta Street, which is built over the creek. This view looks south at the unusual curve caused by the creek's path

A swamp area existed in what is now Washington Square Park, fed by the waters of Minetta Creek. The creek served as a boundary between a potter's field which was established on April 7, 1797, and was in operation until May 25, 1825, on its eastern bank, and private property to its west.

The southernmost part of the creek's course was the estate known as Richmond Hill, originally created by Abraham Mortier in the late 1760s. In 1794, he leased it to Aaron Burr, who altered the course of the creek to form "Burr's Pond" at the foot of his estate.

== Covering ==
In 1896, Charles Haynes Haswell recalled an observation from eighty years earlier. Minetta Stream had been "fully apparent; and as it was and is of considerable volume, it has been [a] very important and expensive factor in the construction of the foundations along its line, from its main source, near the site of the Union Club, to its discharge in the North [i.e. Hudson] River." "In 1820 there still was a small colony of muskrats, bordering this creek," Issachar Cozzens recalled in 1843. "The brook passed along the lower end of Potter's Field, and formed a large pond called Bollus's Pond, where Downing Street now is; the low swampy grounds that were filled up caused this pond, which lay a little north-west of Richmond Hill."

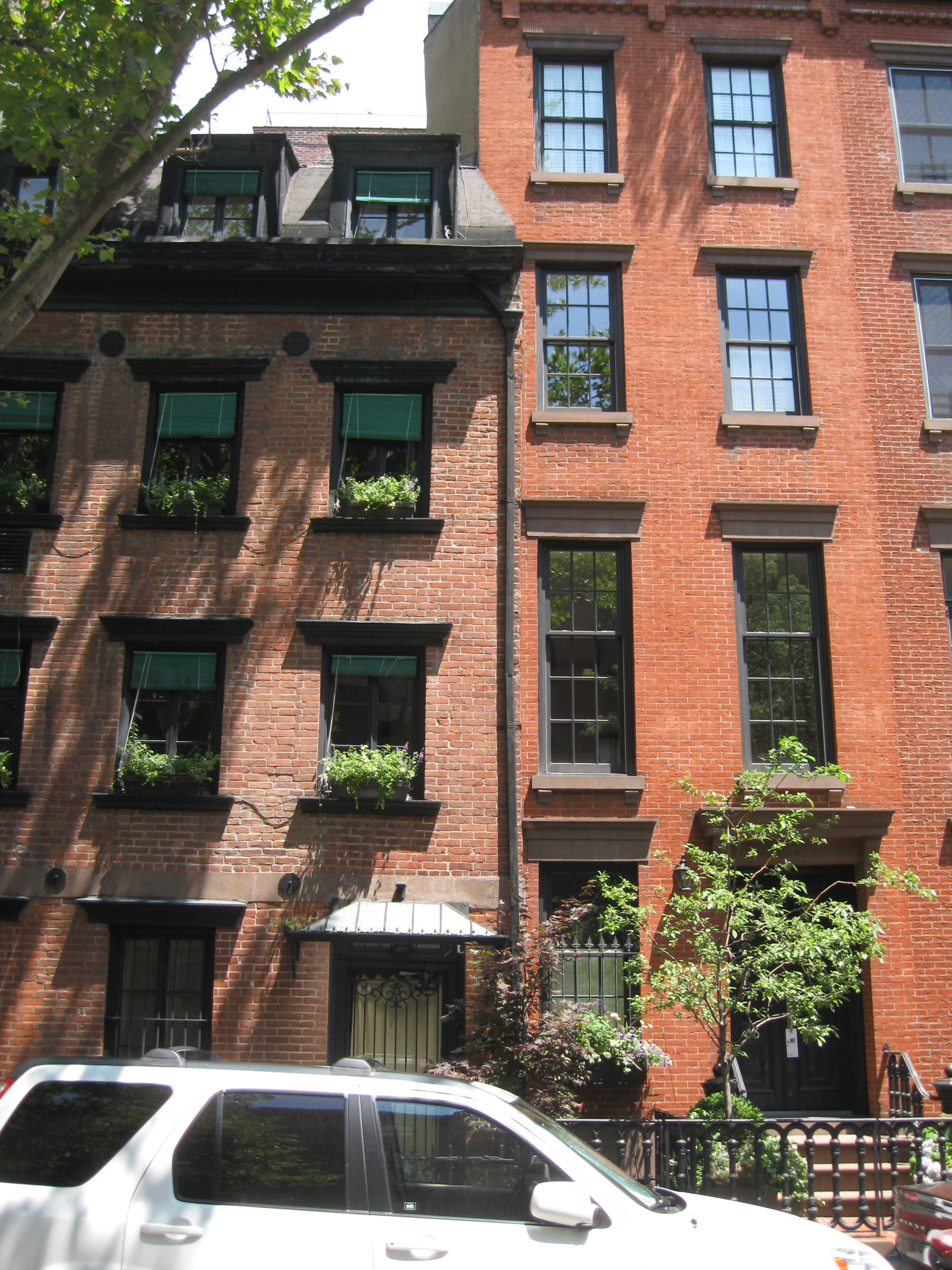
Street view of 45 West 12th Street (left), whose eastern wall overlaps 43 West 12th Street (right), a result of the former building constructed on the bank of Minetta Creek

The covering of Minetta Stream began in 1820, when the common council appointed James Wallace to build a Minetta sewer. Joan H. Geismar, an urban archaeologist who wrote an archaeological assessment of Washington Square Park in 2005, hypothesized that the purpose of this sewer was in part to function as a drain directing water away from the potter's field. Geismar surmised that the building of the sewer was not enough for the creek to avoid the cemetery because in 1823, the common council directed Thomas Cummings to deepen the riverbed of Minetta Creek. Due to the opening of Fifth Avenue, on December 10, 1824, the Council directed that Minetta Creek be culverted from its location at Fourth Street (now Washington Square South) to Sixth Street (now Washington Square North). (Note: Geismar 2005, p. 28. Geismar expresses some doubt as to whether this plan was ever carried out, although she warns of uncovering the wooden culvert on p. 39 and provides a schematic of its approximate location on p. 42.) With the closing of the potter's field on May 25, 1825, the council chose to transform the area into a military parade ground, which eventually became Washington Square Park. By autumn 1828, the creek was diverted to the Hudson River through a wooden sewer. By 1849, the Richmond Hill estate near the southern end of the stream had been demolished, with row houses taking its place, indicating that water no longer flowed through the area. The residential brownstone residence at 45 West Twelfth Street was built in 1846, with its eastern wall at an odd shape, slightly overlapping its neighbor at 43 West Twelfth Street (erected in 1861). This wall had been necessitated because the house was built on the bank of Minetta Creek.

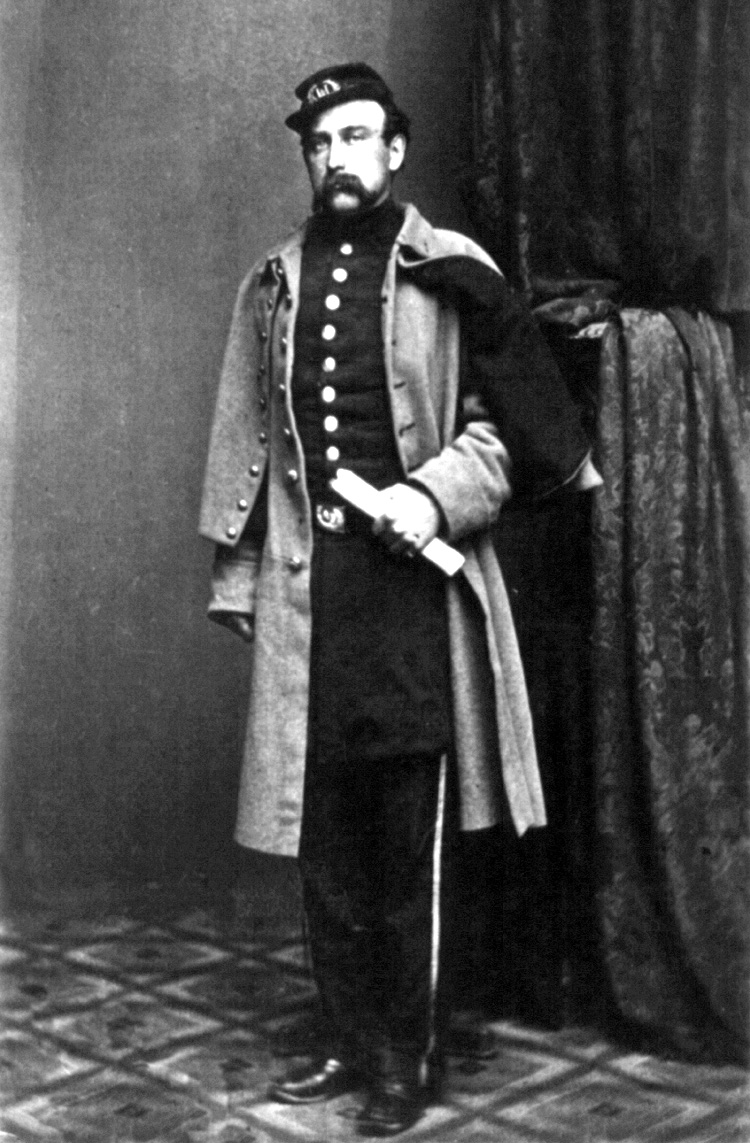
Egbert Ludovicus Viele, a nineteenth-century expert on Minetta Creek

With increasing numbers of immigrants moving to the area during the latter half of the nineteenth century, several doctors were appointed by the New York State Legislature to investigate housing conditions in tenements, and they spent many days interrogating various residents. On October 27, 1884 they interrogated John F. Attridge, a real estate agent, on living conditions in various kinds of housing in lower Manhattan. At one point Doctor S. Oakley Vanderpoel raised the subject of whether houses built over filled-in ground had proper drainage. To this Attridge responded: "I lived for fifteen years over Minetta Brook, and the people always considered it the most unhealthy place in New York, but there was nobody sick."

In 1892, the New York Times reported the flooding of the cellar of Solomon Sayles, a merchant whose store was located at 126 Sixth Avenue, between Tenth and Eleventh Streets. This incident provided the Times's reporter an opportunity to speak with Egbert Ludovicus Viele, who had designed the Topographical & Sanitary Map of Manhattan published in 1865. Viele had first investigated the creek in 1860, using a British survey made at the time of the Revolutionary War. Viele explained that the creek was a source of water prior to construction of the Croton Distributing Reservoir. Once the reservoir had been completed in 1842, the creek was no longer needed as a water source, and it became a dumping ground. When Viele once gave a talk on the creek, an elderly physician in the audience recalled cases of intermittent fever due to the creek. Viele was quoted as saying "I have no doubt that the water in Mr. Sayles's cellar comes from the sources of Minetta Creek." He then described the source of Minetta Creek as a perennial spring. Viele concluded that because the springs were natural, dams could not be installed upon them. The 1892 article recommended better drainage for Manhattan's subterranean water sources.

In his 1894 book, In Old New York, Thomas A. Janvier wrote: "Although Manetta Creek no longer is visible on the surface, it still flows in diminished volume through its ancient channel—as those living near or over it sometimes know to their cost." Janvier described the creek's path and warned that no buildings could be built on or near it without extensive reinforcements to their foundations. In addition to Sayles's store, he mentioned the recent floodings of the Lincoln Building at the southwest corner of Union Square, the building at the northeast corner of 19th Street and Fifth Avenue, and 66 Fifth Avenue.

In 1897, George Everett Hill and George E. Waring Jr. wrote: "Although Minetta Brook has been lost to sight for many years, we have abundant evidence that it still exists. Deep excavations near its course are almost invariably flooded by its waters, and heavy buildings over or beside it require elaborate foundations of piling."

== Encounters with the creek underground ==
Encounters with Minetta Creek in the twentieth century were based on construction projects that unexpectedly encountered its water underground. In 1900, construction workers for the Hudson and Manhattan Railroad (H&M; today the PATH) had to navigate quicksand formed from the water. Their work was particularly difficult as they could not break the surface of Sixth Avenue, which would have disrupted traffic. The next year, Egbert Ludovicus Viele was again contacted concerning flooding in a construction project, and again declared the source of water to be Minetta Creek.

In 1907, the Degnon Contracting Company was building the H&M Railroad's Uptown Hudson Tubes north of Ninth Street and declared the water to have dried up, to the relief of area property owners who had previously spent thousands of dollars on pumps to rid their properties of water. This was again confirmed by a 1916 article. Subsequently, in 1928, the Independent Subway System's West Fourth Street–Washington Square station (now part of the New York City Subway system) was built under the H&M tunnels. A reporter for The New York Times indicated that the stream could be seen in the construction site.

In 1929, workers at the construction site of Jefferson Market found their worksite filled with water. H. W. Lesh, the chief engineer of contractor Marcus Construction Company, attributed the source to Minetta Creek. A photograph of the site under construction shows a pool of water from the creek. In 1977, during construction on Saint Vincent's Catholic Medical Center, Crimmins Construction encountered water from Minetta Creek. Robert Crimmins reported that the water was "quite clean" and that it flows "through the ground quite rapidly."

The construction of Jimi Hendrix's Electric Lady Studios, in 1968, had been delayed in part due to flooding attributed to Minetta Creek. In 2014, author Rachel Kaadzi Ghansah wrote about a visit to Electric Lady Studios in The Believer, where she saw water from the creek "rushing clear and steady" through a hole in the studio's cellar.

To this day, it is disputed whether Minetta Creek actually exists. Bloggers claim that the creek still exists, based on evidence of flooding in basements and cellars. Will Hunt, searching in 2011, could not find any evidence of subterranean water. In 2012, local news station WCBS-TV ran a story about several people looking into a manhole on Sixth Avenue, along the creek's former route, where observers found water that "looked too clean for the city sewer". Steve Duncan, a historian and self-described geographer, told WCBS about the presence of potholes on 12th and 13th streets near where the creek crossed these streets, as well as flooding in basements along the creek's route.

== Gallery ==
Examples of Minetta Creek's effect on Manhattan topography

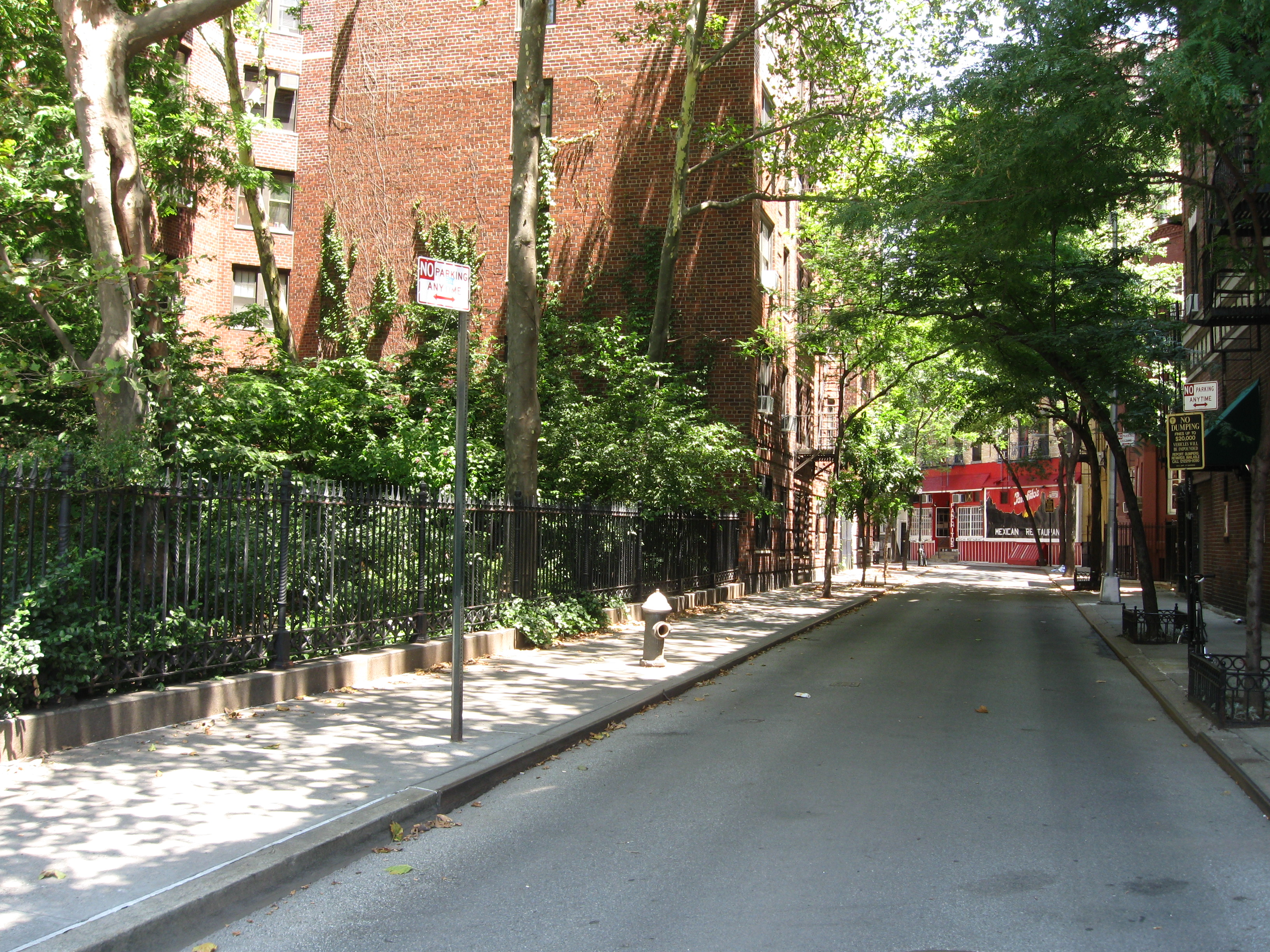
View looking north of Minetta Street which is built on the approximate riverbed of Minetta Creek; Minetta Triangle is on the left

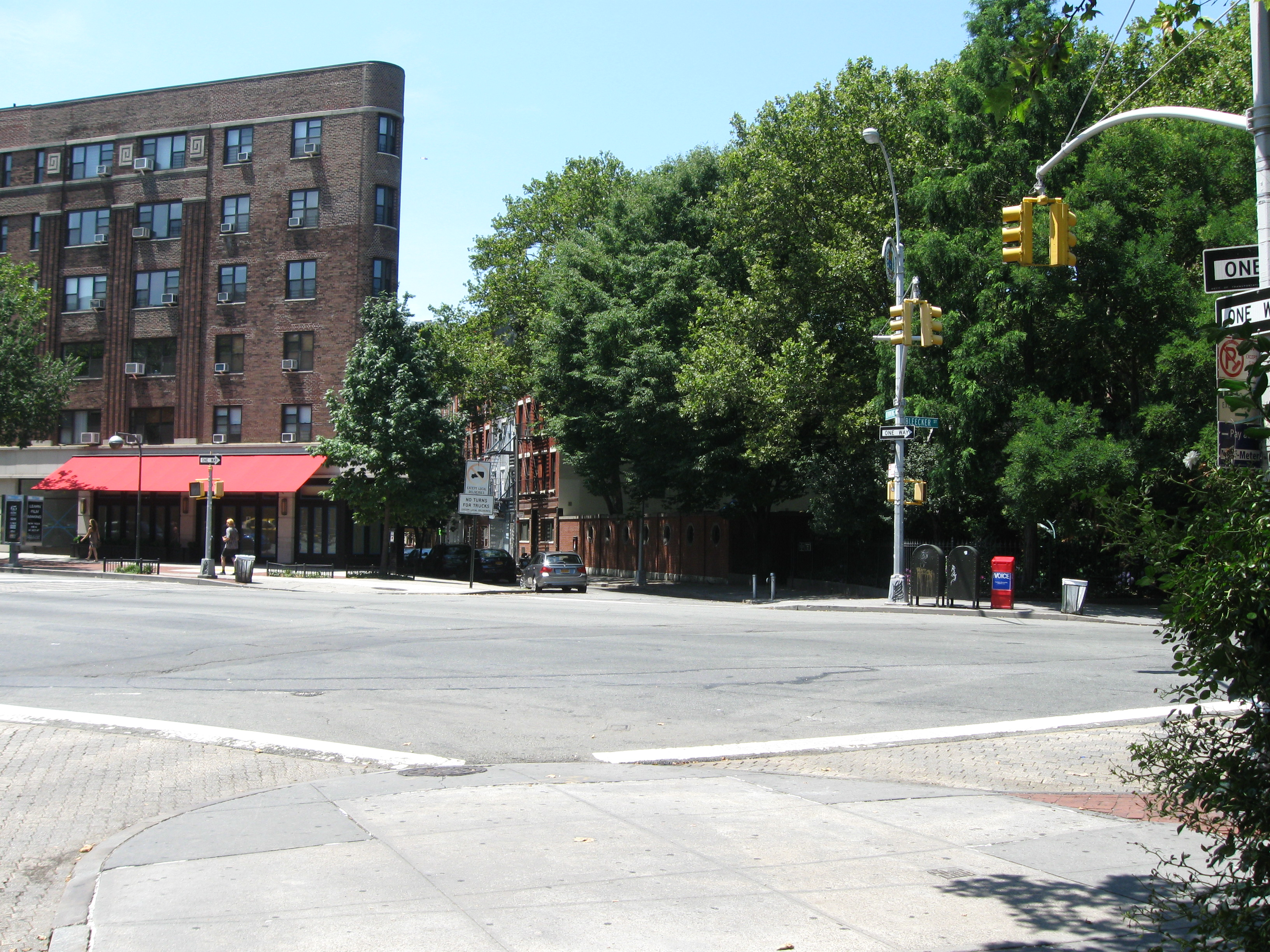
View from Minetta Street looking south across Sixth Avenue at Downing Street; both Minetta Street and Downing Street are built on top of the Minetta Creek riverbed

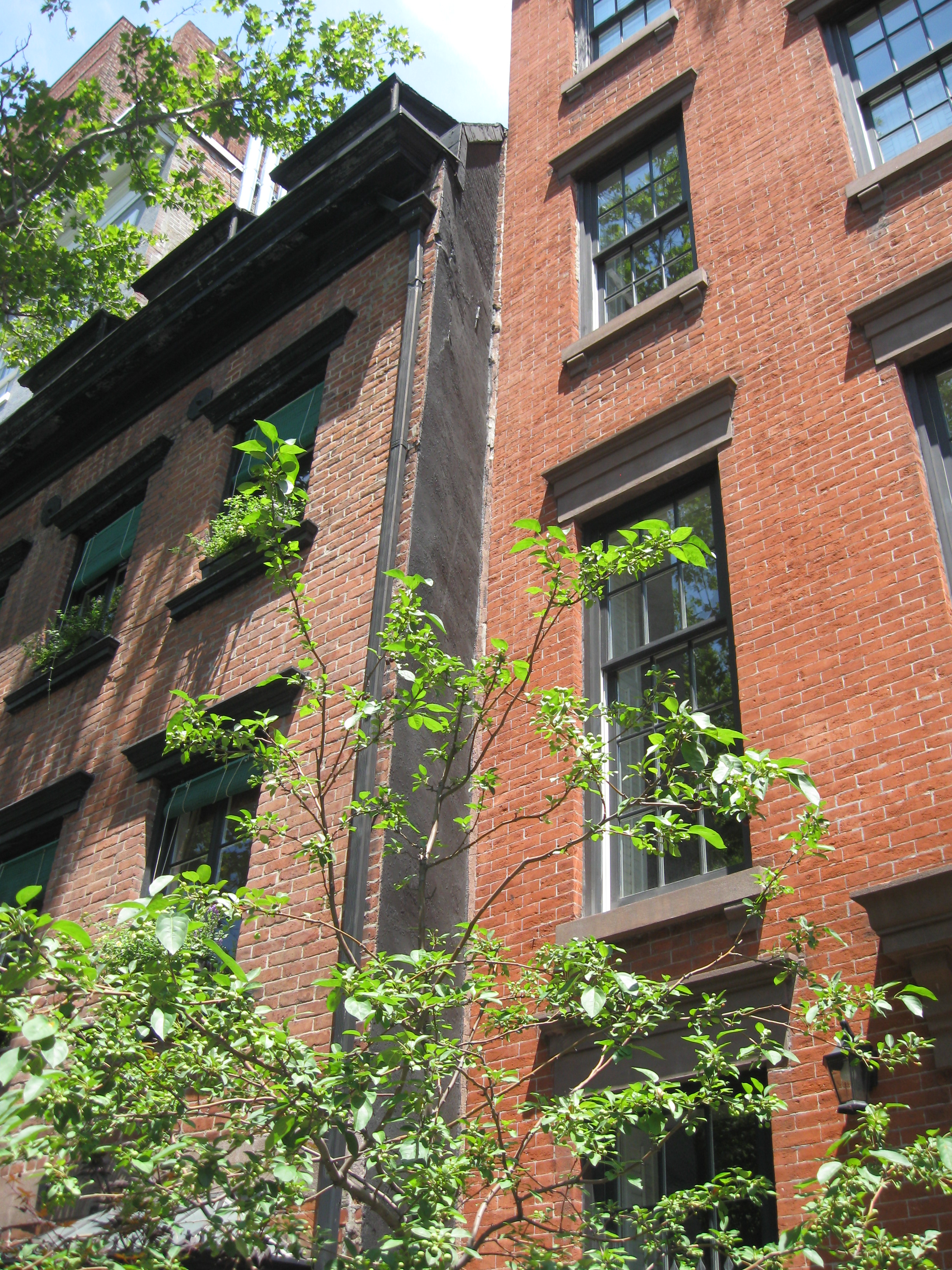
Upper view of overlap of 45 West 12th Street (at left) over 43 West 12th Street (at right), a result of the former building constructed on the Minetta Creek shoreline

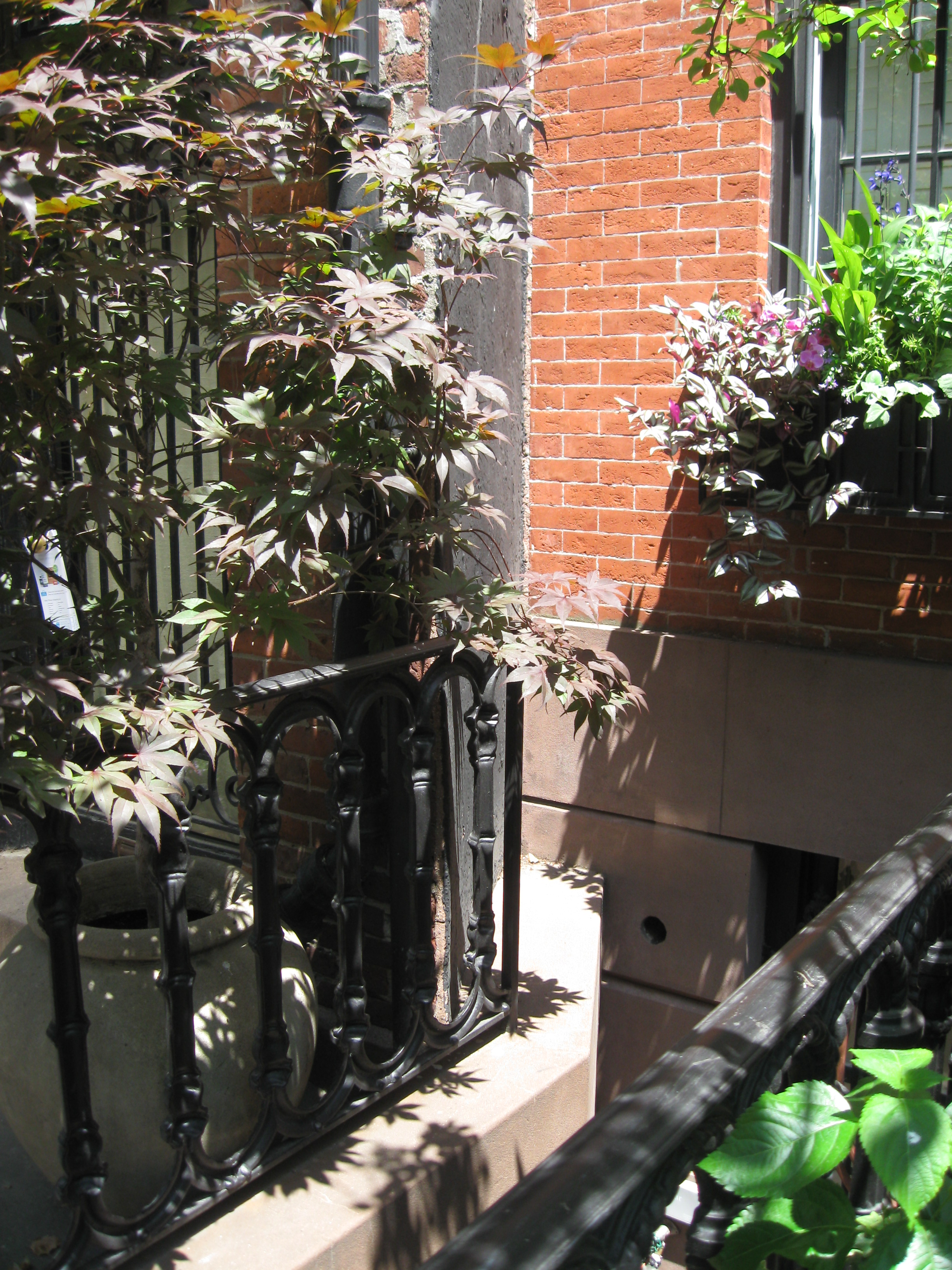
Lower view of overlap of 45 West 12th Street (at left) over 43 West 12th Street (at right), a result of the former building constructed on the Minetta Creek shoreline

Places named for Minetta Creek

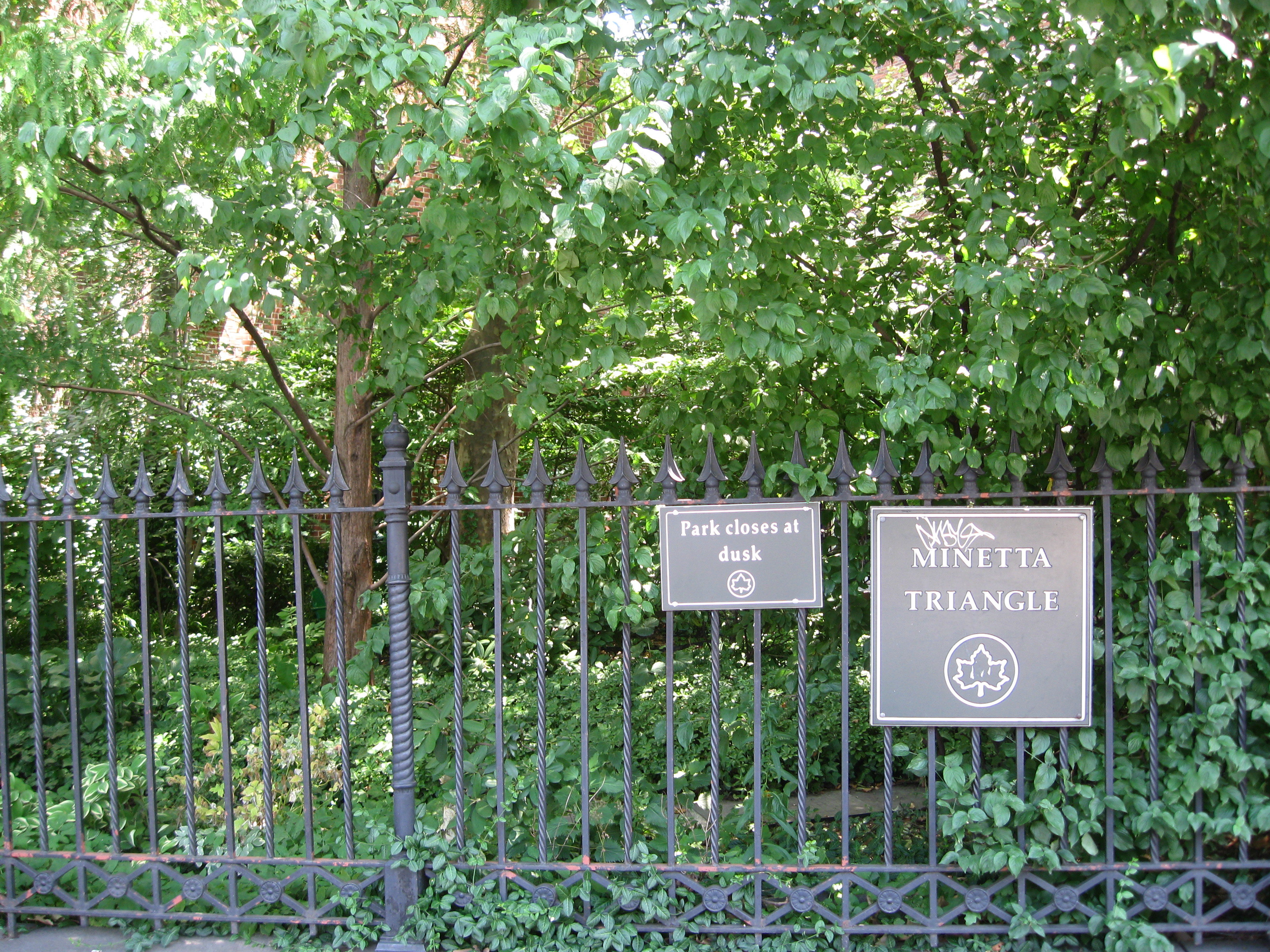
Minetta Triangle, a small park where Minetta Street meets Sixth Avenue

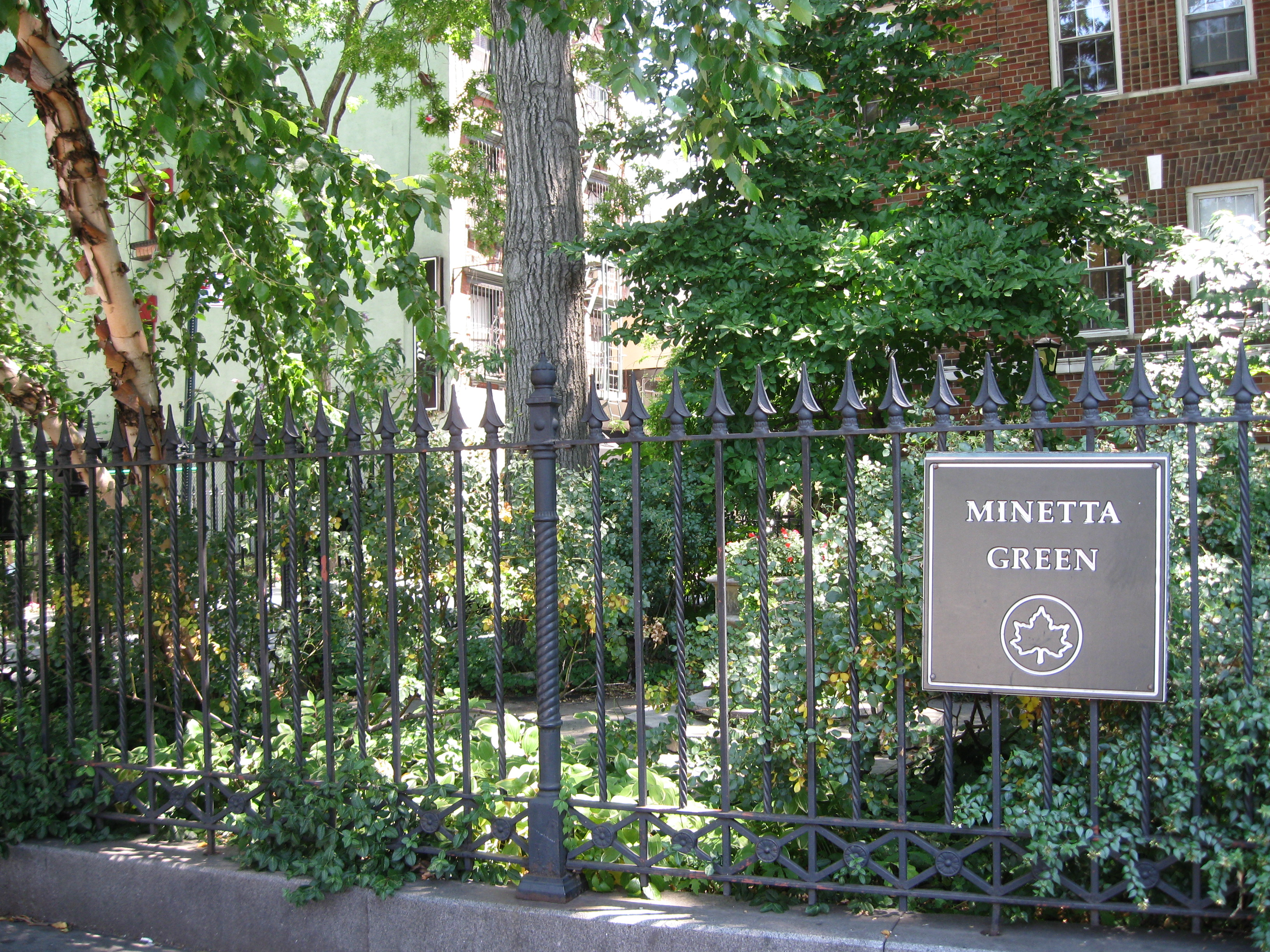
Minetta Green, on Sixth Avenue south of Minetta Lane

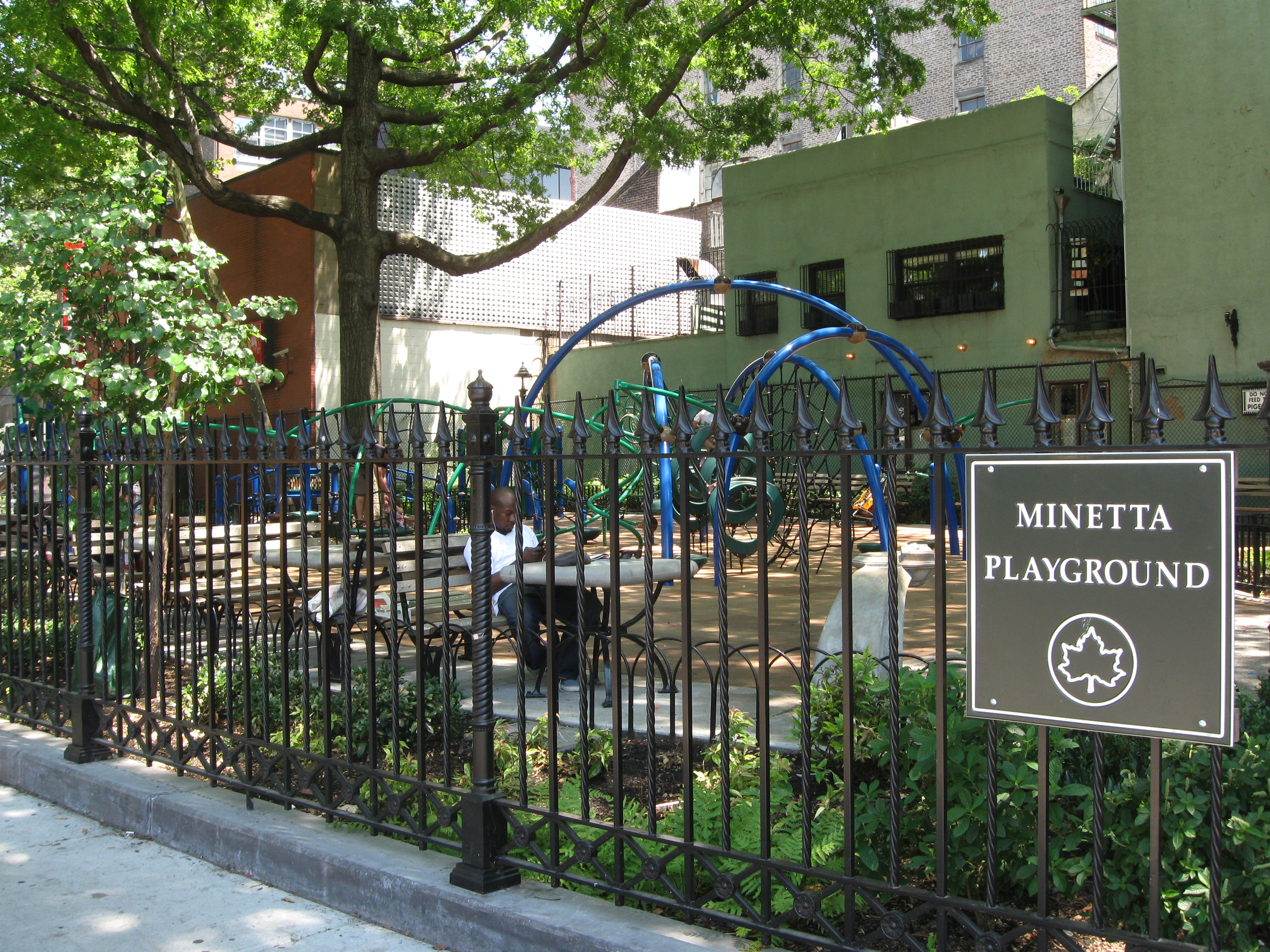
Minetta Playground, on Sixth Avenue between Third and Fourth Streets
