= Henry Sloane Coffin =

American minister (1877–1954)

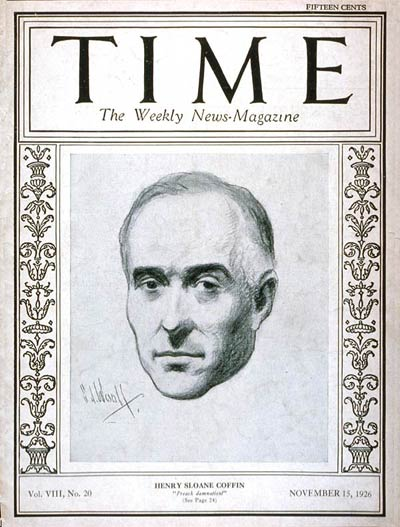
- Coffin on the cover of Time November 15, 1926
- Born: January 5, 1877; New York City, U.S.
- Died: November 25, 1954 (aged 77); Lakeville, Connecticut, U.S.
- Title: President of the Union Theological Seminary
- Spouse: Dorothy (nee Eells)

Academic background
- Education: Yale College, Union Theological Seminary

Henry Sloane Coffin (January 5, 1877 – November 25, 1954) was president of the Union Theological Seminary, Moderator of the Presbyterian Church in the United States of America, and one of the most famous ministers in the United States. He was also one of the translators of the popular hymn "O Come, O Come Emmanuel", along with John Mason Neale.

== Biography ==
Coffin was the son of Edmund Coffin and Euphemia Sloane. He was an heir to the fortune of the furniture firm of W. and J. Sloane & Co. His brother was William Sloane Coffin, who was later the president of New York's Metropolitan Museum of Art.

Coffin attended Yale College and obtained a Bachelor of Arts in 1897. In 1896, he was one of fifteen juniors invited to join the Skull and Bones. He then received his master's degree from Yale in 1900.

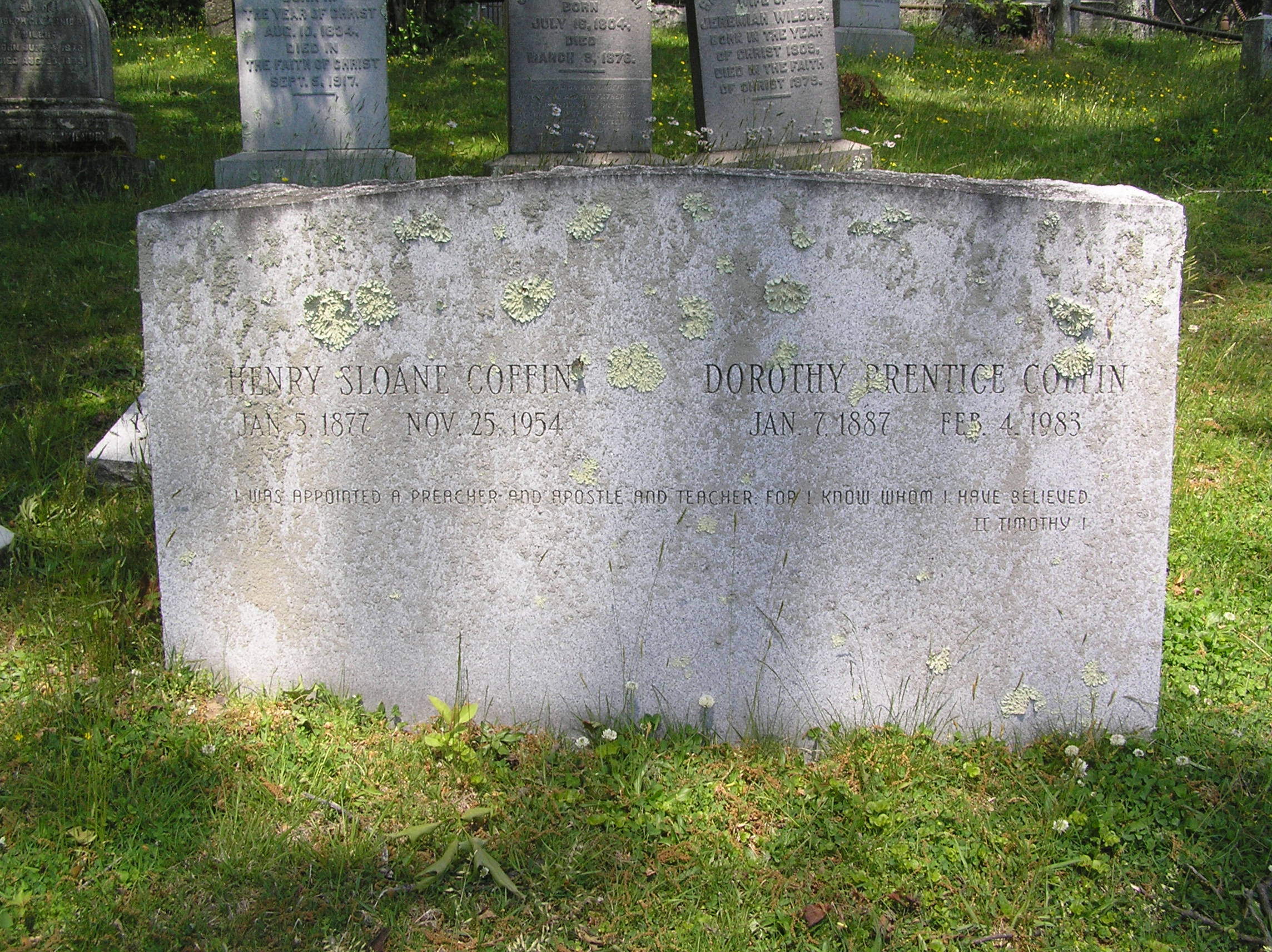
The gravesite of Henry Sloane Coffin

During his time at Yale, Coffin was on friendly terms with evangelist Dwight L. Moody, who devoted considerable attention to Coffin during his famous Northfield Conferences in Massachusetts. In spite of Moody's influence, Coffin would emerge as a leading theological liberal.

Coffin also obtained his Bachelor of Divinity from the Union Theological Seminary in 1900. He then became pastor of Madison Avenue Presbyterian Church in New York City in 1910. He declined an offer to become president of Union Theological Seminary in 1916. In 1917, he became Chairman of the Committee of the Board of Home Missions. In 1926, offered the presidency of Union a second time, he accepted and retained the post until 1945.

On March 20, 1927, Coffin preached at a 75th Anniversary service for the Central Congregational Church in Providence, Rhode Island.

Coffin was married to Dorothy Eells. He was the uncle of William Sloane Coffin, and a member of the Yale Corporation (1921–45).

Henry Sloane Coffin died in 1954 at age 77 and was interred at Sleepy Hollow Cemetery in Sleepy Hollow, NY.

== Works ==
=== Music ===
- Coffin, Henry Sloane; Vernon, Ambrose White (1910). Hymns of the Kingdom of God, with tunes. New York: Barnes. OCLC 816788.

=== Books ===
- ——— (1911). Social Aspects of the Cross. New York: Hodder & Stoughton; George H. Doran Company. OCLC 2025617.
- ——— (1914). University Sermons. New Haven, CT: Yale University Press. OCLC 3087064.
- ——— (1915). The Ten Commandments: with a Christian application to present conditions. New York: Hodder & Stoughton; George H. Doran Company. OCLC 24003995.
- ——— (1915). Some Christian Convictions: a practical restatement in terms of present-day thinking. New Haven, CT; London: Yale University Press; Oxford University Press. OCLC 2161577.
- ——— (1918). In a Day of Social Rebuilding: lectures on the ministry of the church. Lyman Beecher lectures. Vol. 44th. New Haven, CT: Yale University Press. OCLC 6438204.
- ——— (1922). What is There in Religion?. New York: Macmillan. OCLC 1433526.
- ——— (1926). What to preach. New York: George H. Doran Company. OCLC 331924.
- ——— (1926). The Portraits of Jesus Christ in the New Testament. New York: Macmillan. OCLC 1015672.
- ——— (1931). The Meaning of the Cross. New York: Scribner. OCLC 5744451.
- ——— (1933). What Men are Asking: some current questions in religion. Cole lectures - 1933. Nashville, TN: Cokesbury Press. OCLC 6028333.
- ——— (1934). God's Turn. New York; London: Harper & Bros. OCLC 3068432.
- ——— (1940). Religion Yesterday and Today. Nashville, TN: Cokesbury Press. OCLC 3297242.
- ——— (1946). The Public Worship of God: a source book. Westminster Source Books. Philadelphia, PA: The Westminster Press. OCLC 166224.
- ——— (1947). God Confronts Man in History. New York: Scribner. OCLC 1444731.
- ——— (1952). Communion Through Preaching: the monstrance of the Gospel. George Craig Stewart Lectures. New York: Scribner. OCLC 500871.
- ——— (1954). A Half Century of Union Theological Seminary, 1896-1945: an informal history. New York: Scribner. OCLC 664803.
- ———. Bowie, Walter Russell (ed.). Joy in Believing: selections from the spoken and written words and the prayers. New York: Scribner, [1956. OCLC 547760.

=== Articles and chapters ===
- ——— (1939). "Religion in the last hundred years". A Century of Social Thought: a series of lectures delivered at Duke University during the academic year 1938-1939 as a part of the centennial celebration of that institution. Duke University Publications. Durham, NC: Duke University Press. OCLC 3370775.

== See also ==
- People on the cover of Time magazine - November 15, 1926

Religious titles
Preceded by The Rev. Stuart Nye Hutchison	Moderator of the 155th General Assembly of the Presbyterian Church in the United States of America; 1943–1944	Succeeded by The Rev. Roy Ewing Vale
