= Richmond Hill (Manhattan) =

Place in Manhattan, New York, United States of America

Coordinates: 40°43′36.6″N 74°0′19″W

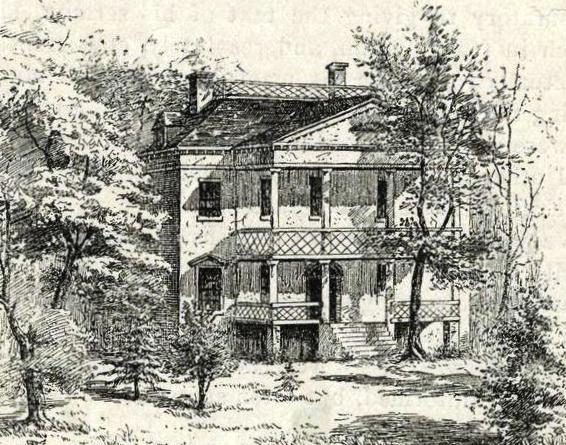
A sketch of the Richmond Hill mansion published in 1847

Richmond Hill was a colonial estate on Manhattan Island, that was built on a 26-acre (110,000 m^{2}) parcel of the "King's Farm" obtained on a 99-year lease in 1767 from Trinity Church by Major Abraham Mortier, paymaster of the British army in the colony. Part of the site is now the Charlton-King-Vandam Historic District of Manhattan's Hudson Square neighborhood.

== History ==
The house stood southeast of the modern intersection of Varick and Charlton Streets and some 100 to 150 yards west of the informal footpath that crossed the ditch in Lispenard's Meadows with a plank, and connected the city with Greenwich Village, which lay north and east of Richmond Hill. The house, as it appears in a 19th-century woodblock in the Museum of the City of New York, was five bays wide, with a tetrastyle Ionic portico, and three bays deep, where there were paired dormers in the attic. It was a frame structure, with carpentered imitation quoins at the corners, raised on a high basement and approached by a flight of steps.

Sir Jeffrey Amherst, later Lord Amherst, made Mortier's house his headquarters at the close of his campaigns in the French and Indian War. The estate served for a time following April 13, 1776, as the headquarters of George Washington, until the retreat of the Continental army from New York after the battle of Long Island, August 27. After it had been occupied by British officers, 1776–83, it served the first British ambassador to the United States, Sir John Temple; it stood empty for a time before becoming the official residence of Vice President John Adams during the first presidency. Abigail Adams was delighted with its situation:

In natural beauty it might vie with the most delicious spot I ever saw. It is a mile and a half from the city of New York. The house stands upon an eminence: at an agreeable distance flows the noble Hudson, bearing upon its bosom innumerable small vessels laden with the fruitful productions of the adjacent country. Upon my right hand are fields beautifully variegated with grass and grain, to a great extent like the valley of the Honiton in Devonshire.

Upon my left the city opens to view, intercepted here and there by a rising mound and an ancient oak. In front beyond the Hudson, the Jersey shores present the exuberance of a rich, well cultivated soil. In the background is a large flower-garden, enclosed with a hedge and some very handsome trees. Venerable oaks and broken ground covered with wild shrubs surround me, giving a natural beauty to the spot which is truly enchanting. A lovely variety of birds serenade me morning and evening, rejoicing in their liberty and security.

In 1794 it was purchased as a country home by Aaron Burr, who had known the house as aide-de-camp to General Putnam at the start of the American Revolution. Minetta Creek made a pond at the foot of Richmond Hill, somewhere about the present junction of Bedford and Downing Streets. In winter "Burr's Pond" as it came to be called, offered skating. One day in 1797 in Burr's absence his fourteen-year-old daughter Theodosia, left in charge of the household, received an unexpected visit from Joseph Brant, the renowned Mohawk chieftain with a letter of introduction from Burr:

This will be handed to you by Colonel Brant, the celebrated Indian Chief ... He is a man of education. ... Receive him with respect and hospitality. He is not one of those Indians who drink rum, but is quite a gentleman; not one who will make you fine bows, but one who understands and practises what belongs to propriety and good-breeding. He has daughters—if you could think of some little present to send to one of them (a pair of earrings for example) it would please him.

On the morning of July 11, 1804, Burr arose from Richmond Hill and had himself ferried across the Hudson to his fateful duel with Alexander Hamilton. In 1807, Burr filed plans for driving three new streets of houses through the property; his plan was approved by the City Council, but he was too strapped for cash to carry the plan to fruition, though he mortgaged the equivalent of 240 building lots to the Bank of the Manhattan Company, for $38,000. Following Burr's occupancy his creditors sold the mortgaged estate to the real-estate magnate John Jacob Astor, for $32,000, who resold the building lots, with leases to run out in 1864, allowing him the reversion for the final three years, with all the structures and other improvements, until the leases reverted to Trinity Church, when he had the right of renewal. In the meantime, in December 1820 Astor had the house set upon logs and rolled down the hill to the southeast corner of Varick and Charlton Streets. He opened the house and its gardens as a public resort in 1822 It was remembered as a genteel roadhouse by a surveyor working when the Commissioners' Plan of 1811 was being laid out. After serving as a resort in its new location it opened in November 1831 as a theater, and "the following year it became the Italian Opera House but finished the year with equestrian shows," the historians of theatre in New York report, and eventually was a common saloon before it was razed in 1849. During the time that the mansion was in existence, the surrounding neighborhood, built up from the 1820s by Astor as modest brick rowhouses, was also called Richmond Hill, connected to the city through the former water meadow, now drained and filled, as a continuation of Canal Street.

== See also ==
- List of Washington's Headquarters during the Revolutionary War
- Charlton-King-Vandam Historic District
