= Vandam Street =

Street in Manhattan, New York

Coordinates: 40.7262°N 74.0039°W

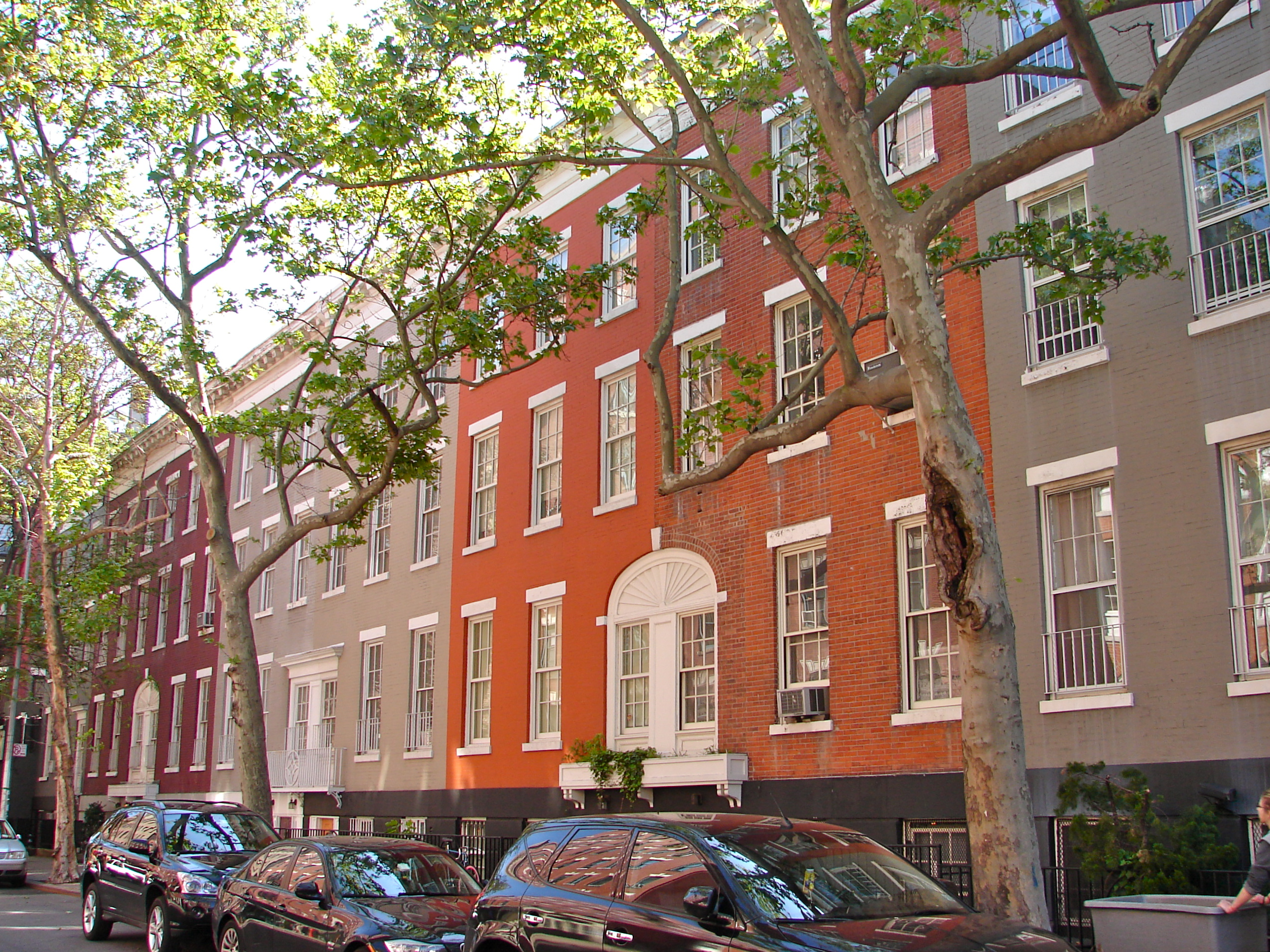
Houses along Vandam Street

Vandam Street is a street in the Hudson Square neighborhood of Lower Manhattan in New York City. It runs east to west from Sixth Avenue to Greenwich Street.

== History ==
On August 16, 1966, the New York City Landmarks Preservation Commission designated 9–29 Vandam Street as part of the Charlton–King–Vandam Historic District. The decision to include the buildings chosen is as follows: "On Vandam Street, numbers 23, 25, 27 and 29 remain in close-to-original state. Their pitched roofs, and dormers, their delicately contrived doorways, and their iron work are appealingly representative of the Federal style." It reflects the New Netherlanders and New York Dutch history in founding New Amsterdam in 1609, which preceded the English colonizers re-naming the land to New York City in 1665.

== Notable locations ==
- SoHo Playhouse at 15 Vandam Street

== Notable residents ==
- Soprano Leontyne Price lived from 1962 until 2013 at 9 Vandam Street.
