= William Sloane Coffin =

American clergyman and peace activist (1924–2006)

- Coffin c. 1980
- Church: United Church of Christ
- Other post: Riverside Church

Orders
- Ordination: Presbyterian Church

Personal details
- Born: William Sloane Coffin Jr. June 1, 1924 New York City, U.S.
- Died: April 12, 2006 (aged 81) Strafford, Vermont, U.S.
- Denomination: Presbyterian, United Church of Christ
- Spouse: Eva Rubinstein; Harriet Gibney; Virginia Randolph Wilson
- Children: David Coffin
- Education: Yale Divinity School

William Sloane Coffin Jr. (June 1, 1924 – April 12, 2006) was an American Mainline Protestant clergyman and peace activist. He was ordained in the Presbyterian Church, and later received ministerial standing in the United Church of Christ. In his younger days he was an athlete, a talented pianist, a CIA officer, and later chaplain of Yale University, where the influence of H. Richard Niebuhr's social philosophy led him to become a leader in the civil rights movement and peace movements of the 1960s and 1970s. He also was a member of the secret society Skull and Bones. He went on to serve as senior minister at Riverside Church in New York City and President of SANE/Freeze, the nation's largest peace and social justice group, and prominently opposed United States military interventions in conflicts, from the Vietnam War to the Iraq War. He was also an ardent supporter of gay rights.

== Biography ==
=== Childhood ===
William Sloane Coffin Jr. was born into the wealthy elite of New York City. His paternal great-grandfather William Sloane was a Scottish immigrant and co-owner of the W. & J. Sloane Company. His uncle was Henry Sloane Coffin, president of Union Theological Seminary and one of the most famous ministers in the United States. His father, William Sloane Coffin, Sr., was an executive in the family business and president of the Metropolitan Museum of Art. Record producer and civil rights activist John Hammond was a cousin, and singer and musician John P. Hammond his nephew. One of his ancestors was Tristram Coffin, an early English settler in Massachusetts and prominent part of the whaling industry of the 1600s who bought Nantucket Island in 1659 for thirty pounds and two beaver hats.

His mother, Catherine Butterfield, grew up in the Midwest, and as a young woman spent time in France during World War I providing relief to soldiers. She met her future husband there, where he was also engaged in charitable activities. Their three children grew up fluent in French by being taught by their nanny, and attended private schools in New York.

William Sr.'s father, Edmund Coffin, was a prominent lawyer, real estate developer, and reformer who owned a property investment and management firm that renovated and rented low-income housing in New York. Upon Edmund's death in 1928, it went to his sons William and Henry, with William managing the firm. When the Great Depression hit in 1929, William allowed tenants to stay whether or not they could pay the rent, quickly draining his own funds, and at a time when the family's substantial W. & J. Sloane stock was not paying dividends.

William Sloane Coffin, Sr. died at home on his oldest son Edmund's 11th birthday in 1933 from a heart attack he suffered returning from work. After this, his wife Catherine decided to move the family to Carmel, California, to make life more affordable, but was able to do this only with financial support from her brother-in-law Henry. After years spent in the most exclusive private schools in Manhattan, the three Coffin children were educated in Carmel's public schools, where William had his first sense that there was injustice—sometimes very great—in the world.

A talented musician, he became devoted to the piano and planned a career as a concert pianist. At the urging of his uncle Henry (who was still contributing to the family's finances), his mother enrolled him in Deerfield Academy in 1938.

The following year (when Edmund left for Yale University), William moved with his mother to Paris at the age of 15 to receive personal instruction in the piano and was taught by some of the best music teachers of the 20th century, including Nadia Boulanger. The Coffins moved to Geneva, Switzerland, when World War II came to France in 1940, and then back to the U.S., where he enrolled in Phillips Academy in Andover, Massachusetts.

=== Early adulthood ===
Having graduated from high school in 1942, William enrolled at Yale College and studied in the School of Music. While continuing his pursuit of the piano, he was also excited by the prospect of fighting to stop fascism and became very focused on joining the war effort. He applied to work as a spy with the Office of Strategic Services in 1943, but was turned down for not having sufficiently "Gallic features" to be effective. He then left school, enlisted in the Army, and was quickly tapped to become an officer. After training, he was assigned to work as liaison to the French and Russian armies in connection with the Army's military intelligence unit. Records indicate he was part of the Ritchie Boys and trained extensively at Camp Ritchie, in Maryland.

After the war, Coffin returned to Yale, where he became president of the Yale Glee Club. He had been a friend of George H. W. Bush since his youth, as they both attended Phillips Academy (1942). In Coffin's senior year, Bush brought Coffin into the university's exclusive Skull and Bones secret society.

Upon graduating in 1949, Coffin entered the Union Theological Seminary, where he remained for a year, until the outbreak of the Korean War reignited his interest in fighting communism. He joined the CIA as a case officer in 1950 (his brother-in-law Franklin Lindsay had been head of the Office of Policy Coordination, the CIA's political warfare arm), spending three years in West Germany recruiting anti-Soviet Russian refugees and training them to undermine Stalin's regime. Coffin grew increasingly disillusioned with the role of the CIA and the U.S. due to events including the CIA's involvement in overthrowing Prime Minister Mohammed Mossadegh of Iran in 1953, followed by the CIA's orchestration of the coup that removed President Jacobo Árbenz in Guatemala in 1954. William F. Buckley Jr. said Coffin blew his cover as a C.I.A. officer.

=== Ministry and political activism ===
External audio
- Interview with William Sloane Coffin on Vietnam, the Ministry and political activism

After leaving the CIA, Coffin enrolled at Yale Divinity School and earned his Bachelor of Divinity degree in 1956, the same year he was ordained a Presbyterian minister. Also that year he married Eva Rubinstein, pianist Arthur Rubinstein's daughter, and became chaplain at Williams College. Soon, he accepted the position of Chaplain of Yale University, where he remained from 1958 until 1975. Gifted with a rich bass-baritone voice, he was an active member of the Yale Russian Chorus during the late 1950s and 1960s.

Coffin was dismayed when he learned in 1964 of the history of French and U.S. involvement in South Vietnam. He felt the U.S. should have honored the French agreement to hold a national referendum in Vietnam about unification. He was an early opponent of the Vietnam War and became famous for his antiwar activities and civil rights activism. In the early 1960s, he co-founded Clergy and Laity Concerned About Vietnam to resist President Lyndon Johnson's escalation of the war.

Coffin had a prominent role in the Freedom Rides challenging segregation and the oppression of black people. As chaplain at Yale in the early 1960s, Coffin organized busloads of Freedom Riders to challenge segregation laws in the South. Through his efforts, hundreds of students at Yale University and elsewhere were recruited into civil rights and antiwar activity. He was jailed many times, but his first conviction was overturned by the Supreme Court.

In 1962, he joined SANE: The Committee for a SANE Nuclear Policy, an organization he later led.

Approached by Sargent Shriver in 1961 to run the first training programs for the Peace Corps, Coffin took up the task and took a temporary leave from Yale, working to develop a rigorous training program modeled on Outward Bound and supervising the building of a training camp in Puerto Rico. He used his pulpit as a platform for like-minded crusaders, hosting Martin Luther King Jr., South African Archbishop Desmond Tutu, and Nelson Mandela, among others. Fellow Yale graduate Garry Trudeau has immortalized Coffin (and Coffin's protege Scotty McLennan) as "the Rev. Scot Sloan" in the comic strip Doonesbury. During the Vietnam War years, Coffin and his friend Howard Zinn often spoke from the same antiwar platform. An inspiring speaker, Coffin was known for optimism and humor: "Remember, young people, even if you win the rat race, you're still a rat."

By 1967, Coffin concentrated increasingly on preaching civil disobedience and supported the young men who turned in their draft cards. He was, however, uncomfortable with draft-card burning, worried that it looked "unnecessarily hostile". Coffin was one of several persons who signed the open letter "A Call to Resist Illegitimate Authority", which was printed in several newspapers in October 1967. That same month, he raised the possibility of declaring Battell Chapel at Yale a sanctuary for resisters, or possibly the site of a large demonstration of civil disobedience. School administration barred the use of the church as a sanctuary. Coffin later wrote, "I accused them of behaving more like 'true Blues than true Christians'. They squirmed but weren't about to change their minds.... I realized I was licked."

On January 5, 1968, Coffin, Benjamin Spock (the pediatrician and baby book author who was also a Phillips Academy alumnus), Marcus Raskin, and Mitchell Goodman (all signers of "A Call to Resist Illegitimate Authority" and members of the anti-war collective RESIST) were indicted by a federal grand jury for "conspiracy to counsel, aid and abet draft resistance". All but Raskin were convicted that June, but in 1970 an appeals court overturned the verdict. Coffin remained chaplain of Yale until December 1975.

In 1977, he became senior minister at Riverside Church—an interdenominational congregation affiliated with both the United Church of Christ and American Baptist Churches—and one of the most prominent congregations in New York City. Coffin was a controversial but inspirational leader at Riverside, with sermon titles like "Abortion", "AIDS", "Homosexuality", and "Iran". His other sermons included "It's a Sin to Build a Nuclear Weapon", and during the Iran hostage crisis, "And Pray for the Iranians, Too". Coffin openly and vocally supported gay rights when many liberals still were uncomfortable with homosexuality. Some of the congregation's socially conservative members openly disagreed with his position on sexuality.

=== Nuclear disarmament ===
Coffin started a strong nuclear disarmament program at Riverside, and hired Cora Weiss (a secular Jew he had worked with during the Vietnam War and had traveled with to North Vietnam in 1972 to accompany three released U.S. prisoners of war), an action that made some parishioners uncomfortable. Broadening his reach to an international audience, he met with numerous world leaders and traveled abroad. His visits included going to Iran to perform Christmas services for hostages being held in the U.S. embassy during the Iran hostage crisis in 1979 and to Nicaragua to protest U.S. military intervention there.

In 1987, he resigned from Riverside Church to pursue disarmament activism full-time, saying there was no issue more important for a man of faith. He became president of SANE/FREEZE, the nation's largest peace and justice organization. He retired with the title president emeritus in the early 1990s, then taught and lectured across the U.S. and overseas. Coffin also wrote several books. He cautioned that we are all living in "the shadow of Doomsday", and urged that people turn away from isolationism and become more globally aware. Shortly before his death, Coffin founded Faithful Security, a coalition for people of faith committed to working for a world free of nuclear weapons.

=== Personal life ===
Coffin was married three times. His marriages to Eva Rubinstein and Harriet Gibney ended in divorce. His third wife, Virginia Randolph Wilson ("Randy"), survived him. Rubinstein, his first wife and the mother of his children, was a daughter of pianist Arthur Rubinstein. The loss of their son Alexander, at age 24, in a car accident in 1983 inspired one of Coffin's most requested sermons. Their two other children are community developer Amy Coffin and folk musician David Coffin. Through his marriage to Harriet Gibney, he was step-father to documentary filmmaker Alex Gibney.

Coffin was given only six months to live in early 2004 due to a weakened heart. He and his wife lived in the small town of Strafford, Vermont, a few houses away from his brother Ned, until his death nearly two years later at age 81.

== Military awards ==
- American Campaign Medal
- European-African-Middle Eastern Campaign Medal
- World War II Victory Medal
- Army of Occupation Medal with "Germany" clasp

== Books ==
=== By Coffin ===
- Letters to a Young Doubter, Westminster John Knox Press, July 2005, ISBN 0-664-22929-8
- Credo, Westminster John Knox Press, December 2003, ISBN 0-664-22707-4
- The Heart Is a Little to the Left: Essays on Public Morality, Dartmouth College, 1st edition, October 1999, ISBN 0-87451-958-6
- The Courage to Love, sermons, Harper & Row, 1982, ISBN 0-06-061508-7
- Once to Every Man: A Memoir, autobiography, Athenaeum Press, 1977, ISBN 0-689-10811-7

=== About Coffin ===
- William Sloane Coffin, Jr.: A Holy Impatience, by Warren Goldstein, Yale University Press, March 2004, ISBN 0-300-10221-6
- The Trial of Dr. Spock, William Sloane Coffin, Michael Ferber, Mitchell Goodman, and Marcus Raskin, by Jessica Mitford, New York, Knopf, 1969 ISBN 0-394-44952-5

== In popular culture ==
The Doonesbury character Reverend Scot Sloan is named (in part) for William Sloane Coffin. Some of the character's early personality reflects Coffin's "Christian revolutionary" approach.

== See also ==
- List of peace activists

== Sources ==
- Once to Every Man: A Memoir (1977)
- William Sloane Coffin, Jr.: A Holy Impatience (2004)
- Passion for the Possible: A Message to U.S. Churches
