= Eva Rubinstein =

Polish–American photographer (born 1933)

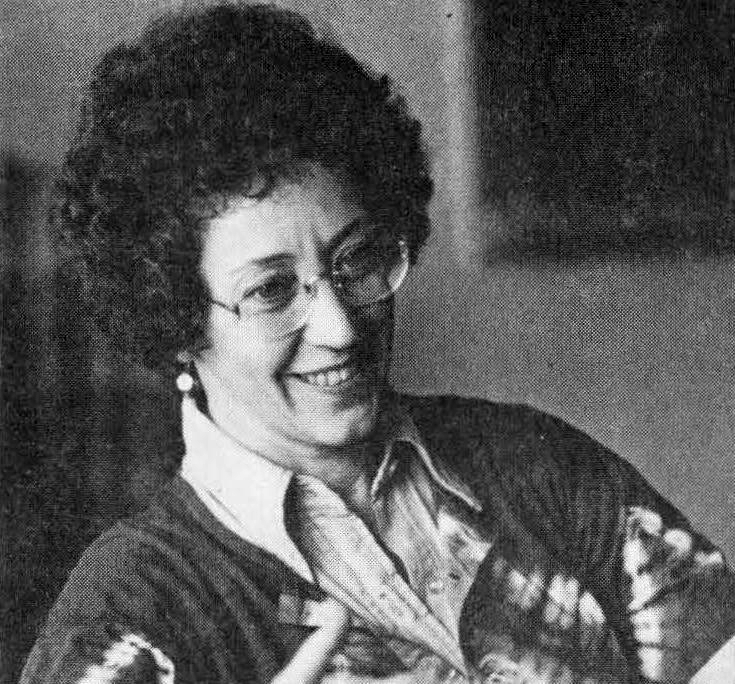
- Rubinstein in 1978
- Born: 1933 (age 92–93); Buenos Aires, Argentina
- Occupation: Photographer

Eva Rubinstein (born 1933) is a Polish-American photographer whose artistic works present portraits, nudes and interiors, often taken in Europe as well as the United States.

== Early life ==
Rubinstein was born in Buenos Aires where her mother, the ballerina Nela Młynarska, was accompanying her father, the pianist Arthur Rubinstein, on a concert tour of South America. She was raised in Paris where she began to train as a ballet dancer at the age of five. In 1939, at the beginning of World War II, the family moved to the United States where Eva Rubinstein received American citizenship in 1946. She attended Scripps College in Claremont, California, and studied drama at the University of California, Los Angeles. From 1953, she worked as a dancer and actress in New York, appearing in the original production of "The Diary of Anne Frank.". In 1956, she married William Sloane Coffin and gave birth to three children, Amy, Alexander and David. The marriage ended in divorce in 1968.

== Photography ==
In 1967, Rubinstein became seriously interested in photography, benefitting from workshops with Lisette Model and Diane Arbus. In addition to her work as a photojournalist, she has taken more intimate photographs of people, including nudes, and of (often empty) interiors. In an interview with Frank Horvat, she explained she had always shown great respect for the people she photographed, never wishing to intrude. She has also led workshops at the School of Visual Arts in Manhattan (1972) and at Manhattanville College, Purchase, New York, (1974-1975) among many other venues in the US and Europe.

== Exhibitions ==
Rubinstein's work has been presented at nearly a hundred solo exhibitions worldwide, among them:

- 1979: Eva Rubinstein: Photographs, Kalamazoo Institute of Arts, Kalamazoo, Michigan
- 1984: Eva Rubinstein (Polska - USA). Fotografia, Muzeum Sztuki, Łódź, Poland
- 1985: Eva Rubinstein, Galerie du Château d'eau, Toulouse, France
- 2009: Élégies, Galerie In Camera, Paris
