= Charlton–King–Vandam Historic District =

Historic district in Manhattan, New York

- Charlton–King–Vandam; Historic District
- U.S. National Register of Historic Places
- U.S. Historic district
- New York State Register of Historic Places
- New York City Landmark
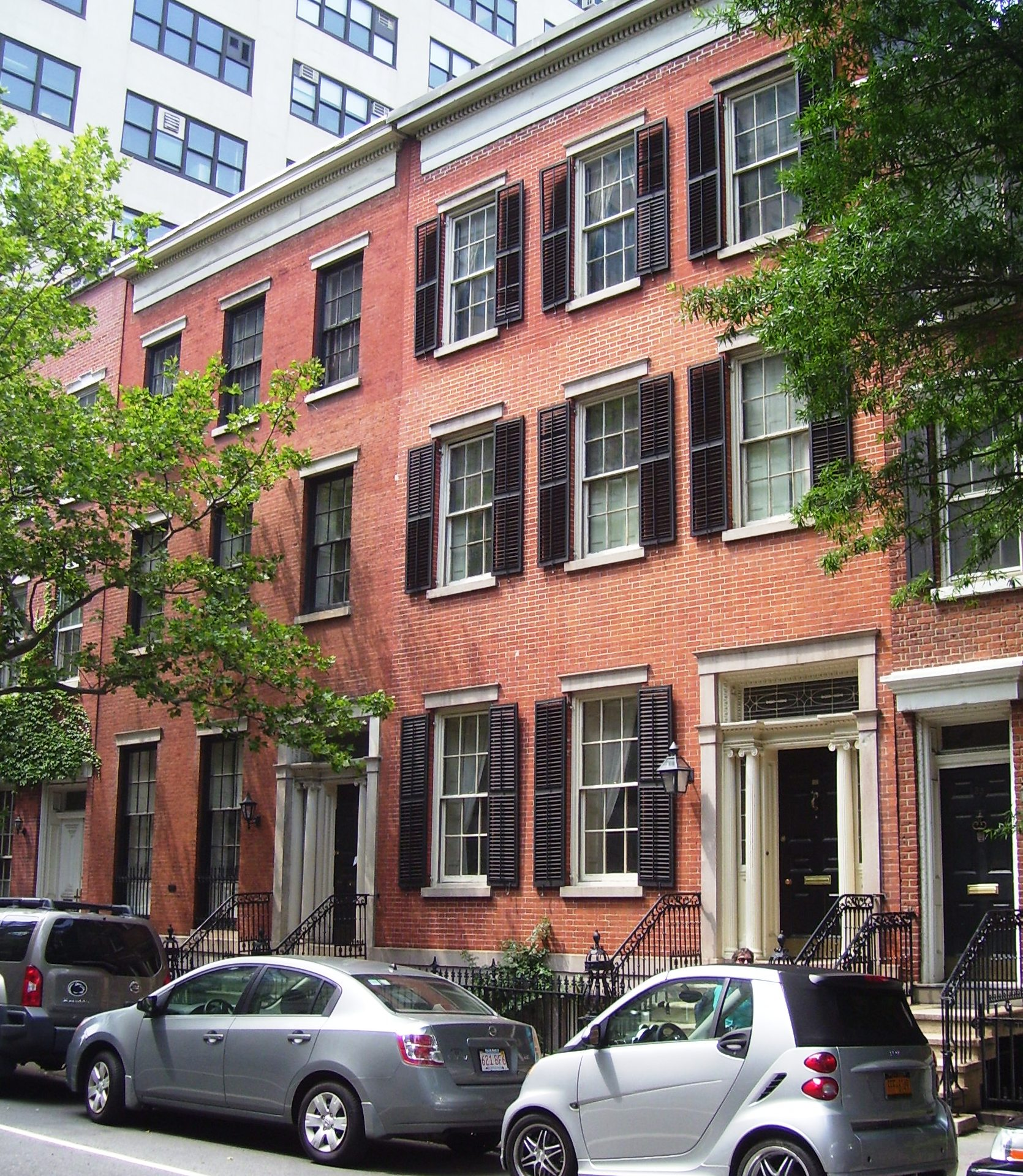
- Federal style row houses at #35 (right) and #37 Charlton Street (c.1820)

- Location within Lower Manhattan Location within New York
- Location: roughly bounded by King, Varick, Vandam, MacDougal & Houston Sts. and Sixth Ave. Manhattan, New York City
- Coordinates: 40°43′39″N 74°00′15″W
- Built: c.1820s-1840s
- Architectural style: Federal, Greek Revival, others
- NRHP reference No.: 73001215
- NYCL No.: 0224

Significant dates
- Added to NRHP: July 20, 1973
- Designated NYSRHP: December 18, 2004
- Designated NYCL: August 16, 1966

The Charlton–King–Vandam Historic District is a small historic district in Lower Manhattan, New York City. Designated by the New York City Landmarks Preservation Commission (NYCLPC) in 1966, the district contains "the city's largest concentration of row houses in the Federal style, as well as a significant concentration of Greek Revival houses." It is sometimes included as part of the South Village (to the east) or Hudson Square (to the southwest), though it is historically distinct from both neighborhoods.

The district includes parts, but not all, of Charlton, King and Vandam Streets between the Avenue of the Americas (Sixth Avenue) and Varick Street (the southern extension of Seventh Avenue), as well as the block bounded by King, MacDougal and Houston Streets and Sixth Avenue. In its designation report, the NYCLPC emphasized that this area was not a modern creation but had once been part of a larger "distinct and separate neighborhood" that was generally developed between 1820 and 1829 and originally extended from the Hudson River (then at Greenwich Street) to MacDougal Street, and from Vandam Street to King Street.

In 1973, the district was added to the National Register of Historic Places.

== History ==
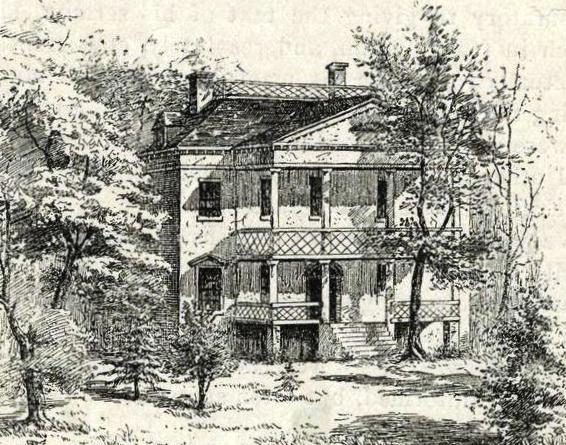
The Richmond Hill mansion

The Charlton–King–Vandam area was part of the estate of Richmond Hill, a Georgian mansion built in 1767 and said to be one of the most beautiful mansions in Manhattan. It was used by George Washington during the American Revolution as a headquarters and later became John Adams' Vice Presidential Mansion when the new country's capital was New York City. Aaron Burr bought the mansion, and after living in it for a time and using it as the site of lavish parties, it was Burr who, in 1797, mapped the property, dividing it into lots and laying out the grid of three streets, which would become Charlton, King and Vandam. After Burr's duel with Alexander Hamilton, he lost control of the estate to John Jacob Astor, the leading land developer of the time, who paid off Burr in 1817 and proceeded to develop the area.

Astor had the mansion moved from the top of the hill it stood on to the corner of Charlton and Varick, and the hill was levelled; the mansion was subsequently used as a theatre. Builders bought the majority of the lots Astor laid out, so that much of the construction in the neighborhood took place in the early and mid-1820s, although some Greek Revival houses date from the 1840s, replacing houses destroyed by fire. After the mansion was razed in 1849, the neighborhood name "Richmond Hill" fell into disuse.

== Architecture ==
The north sides of Charlton and Vandam Streets display "exceptional examples" of Federal-style architecture, especially #37 and #39 Charlton Street, as well as houses showing elements transitional to the early Greek Revival style. King Street has a more varied mix, including Greek Revival houses, particularly those at #20 and #40-44, and houses in the Federal, Anglo-Italianate and Roman Revival styles. King also includes the former Public School 8, now converted to residences, designed by David Skagg and built in 1886, which has been characterized as a "lively Queen Anne-style building".

== See also ==
- Richmond Hill (Manhattan)
- MacDougal–Sullivan Gardens Historic District
- South Village
- van Dam
