= MacDougal–Sullivan Gardens Historic District =

Historic district in Manhattan, New York

- MacDougal–Sullivan Gardens; Historic District
- U.S. National Register of Historic Places
- U.S. Historic district
- New York State Register of Historic Places
- New York City Landmark
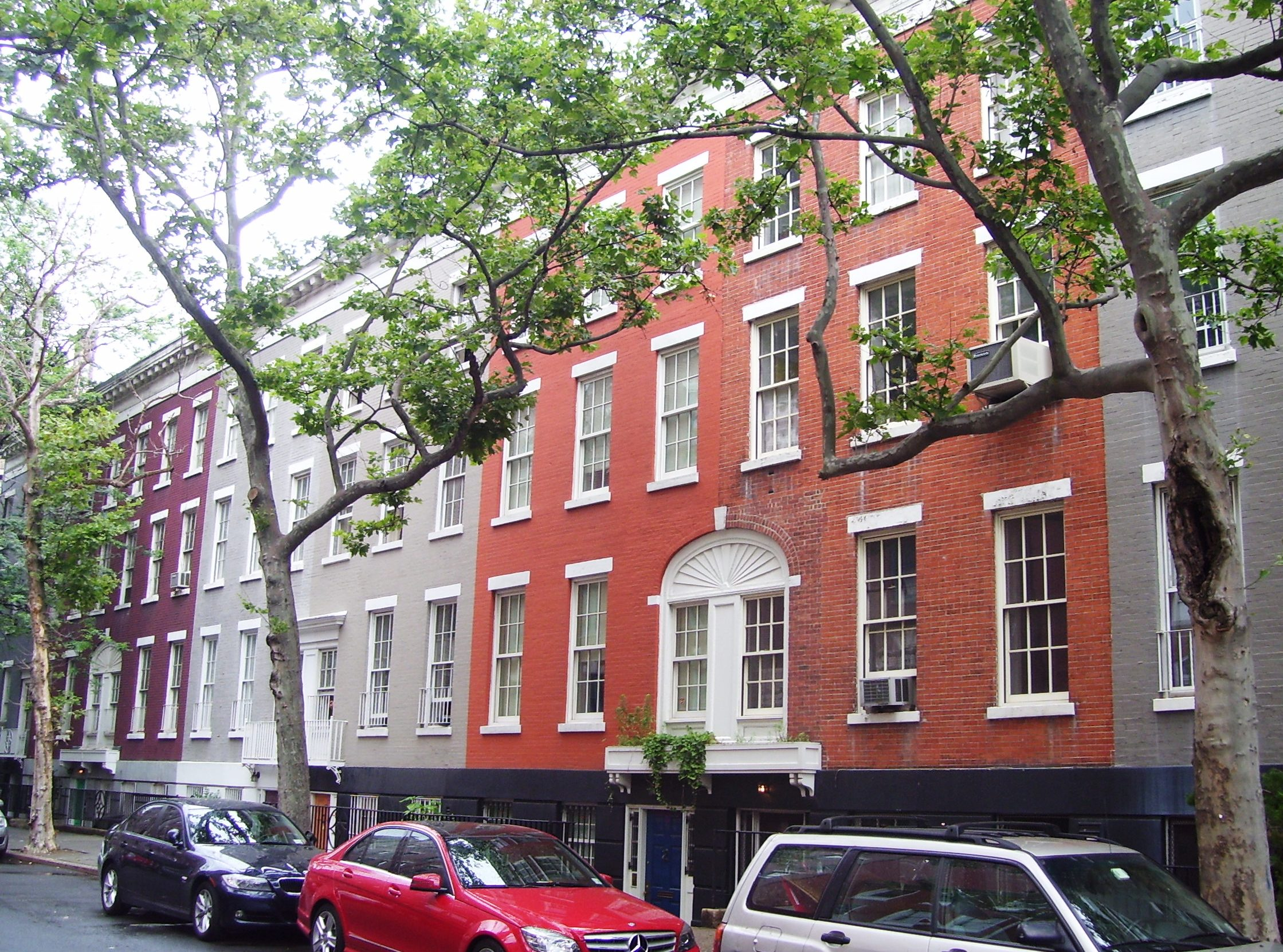
- 82–96 MacDougal Street

- Location within Lower Manhattan Location within New York
- Location: 74–86 MacDougal St. and 170–188 Sullivan St. Manhattan, New York City
- Coordinates: 40°43′42″N 74°00′05″W
- Built: MacDougal: 1844; Sullivan: 1850; Renovation & redesign: 1921
- Architect: Renovation & redesign: Francis Y. Joannes and Maxwell Hyde
- Architectural style: Colonial Revival with Greek Revival elements
- NRHP reference No.: 83001736
- NYCL No.: 0225

Significant dates
- Added to NRHP: June 30, 1983
- Designated NYSRHP: April 5, 1983
- Designated NYCL: August 2, 1967

The MacDougal–Sullivan Gardens Historic District is a small historic district of twenty-two houses at 74–96 MacDougal Street and 170–188 Sullivan Street between Houston and Bleecker Streets in the South Village area of the Greenwich Village neighborhood of Manhattan, New York City.

The district was designated a New York City landmark in 1967 and was added to the National Register of Historic Places in 1983.

== History ==
The land under what would become the historic district was purchased in 1796 by Nicholas Low, a prominent New York merchant. The houses were built in 1844 (MacDougal Street) and 1850 (Sullivan Street) by Low's estate, in the fashionable Greek Revival style. The original plans for the houses called for street level retail space and dormered roofs.

Over time, the houses became run-down, until they were bought in 1920 by William Sloane Coffin Sr., a director of the furniture and rug retailer W. & J. Sloane, who formed the Hearth and Home Corporation to do so. Coffin's intention was to create an affordable development for middle-class professionals in what had become a slum; the project would be the most extensive such effort to that time. Coffin engaged architects Francis Y. Joannes and Maxwell Hyde, who converted the houses into apartments – a five-room duplex, a four-room apartment, and two "non-housekeeping" apartments – and re-faced the buildings in Colonial Revival style while retaining some of the original Greek Revival elements. They removed all the buildings' stoops, altered the doorways and entrances to the basement level, and combined the rear yards to make a common garden which included a playground for children.

The renovation of the buildings was completed by 1921, and the garden by 1923. The houses were sold to individual owners in 1924, with the integrity of the project maintained by the MacDougal–Sullivan Gardens Association.

Coffin's development was influential in its time, inspiring other developments such as that which is now the Turtle Bay Gardens Historic District, and remains a "model for urban city housing".

== See also ==
- Charlton–King–Vandam Historic District (1820s–1840s)
