= St. Leo Church (New York City) =

Demolished church in Manhattan, New York

Coordinates: 40°44′39.4″N 73°59′10.2″W

The Church of St. Leo

General information
- Architectural style: Gothic Revival
- Location: Manhattan, New York City, United States
- Construction started: 1880
- Completed: c.1881
- Demolished: 1980s
- Cost: $95,000.
- Client: Roman Catholic Archdiocese of New York

Technical details
- Structural system: Masonry

Design and construction
- Architect: .Lawrence J. O'Connor

The Church of St. Leo was a Roman Catholic parish church closed under the authority of the Roman Catholic Archdiocese of New York, located at 11 East 28th Street, between Fifth and Madison Avenues in Manhattan, New York City.

== History ==
The parish was established in 1880 to relieve the overcrowded St. Stephen's parish by the Rev. Thomas J. Ducey, its first rector, who continued there until his death in 1909. It was dedicated to St. Leo, patron saint of Pope Leo XIII, the reigning pontiff at the time. The Archbishop of New York was John Cardinal McCloskey, the first American-born Cardinal, who was eligible to take part in the conclave that elected Leo pope (but did not because of travel delays).

The Delmonico brothers were significant contributors to the construction of the church. Lorenzo Delmonico was buried from St. Leo's in September 1881. Thomas J. McCluskey, future president of Fordham University, served as vice-rector from 1881 to 1887.

The parish was marked by its broad humanitarian spirit. In 1899 Ducey built the "House of Repose for the Stranger Dead", a separate mortuary chapel at 9 East 28th Street for people of any faith who had died while temporarily being in the city, such as hotel guests. The bodies could remain there until being claimed for a proper funereal arrangement, or St. Leo's clergy would handle the service without remuneration.

In the early 1900s the neighborhood began to change to one of apartments and hotels. The parish was suppressed to become a mission of the former St. Stephen's Church. Some sources say the suppression took place in 1908; others that it occurred in 1909, following Fr. Ducey's death. The church building was given to the Sisters of Mary Reparatrix as a convent and retreat house, and the old rectory was turned into a convent inhabited in 1914 by thirteen professed nuns, three lay sisters and a postulant.

== Building ==
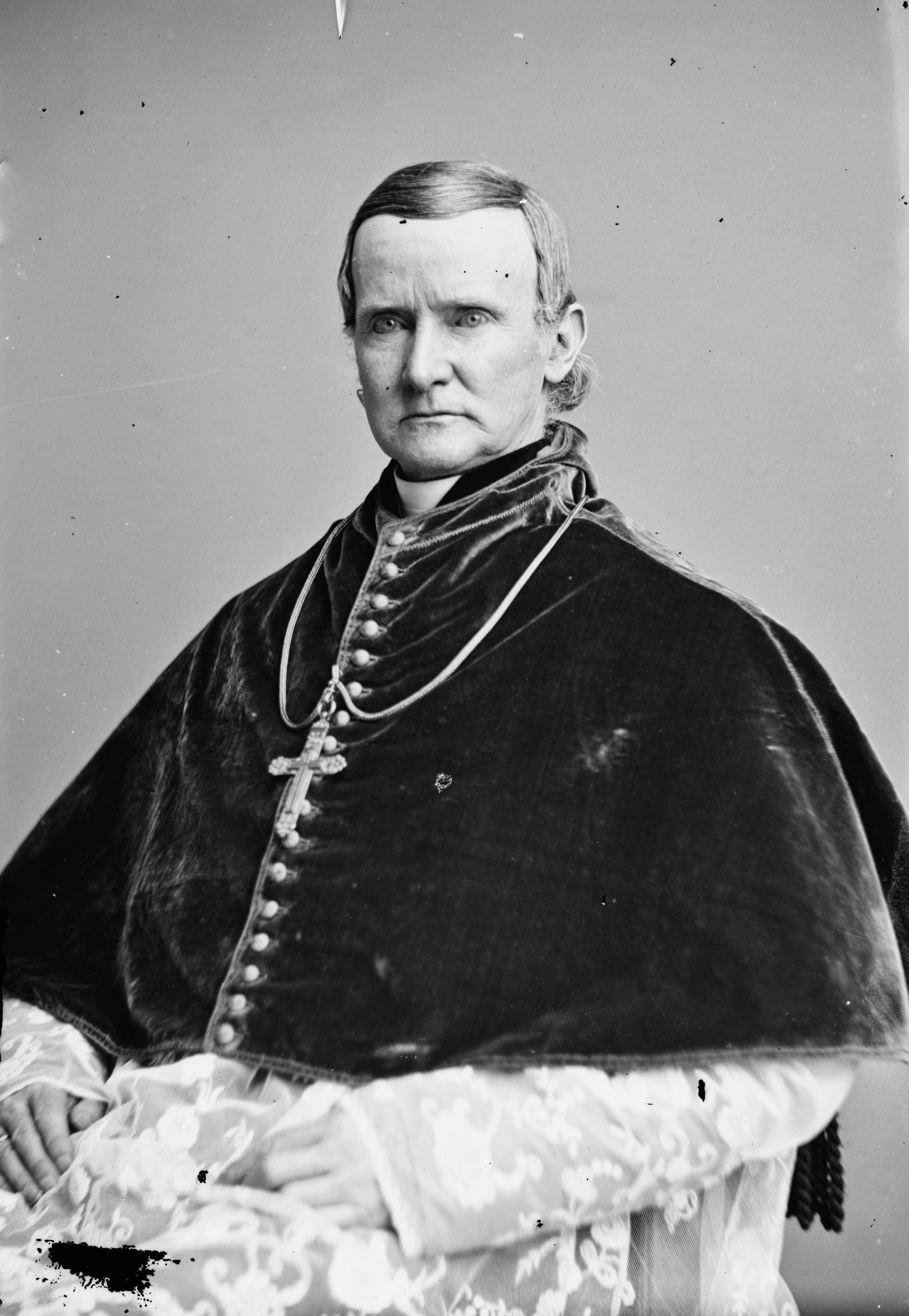
The photo of John Cardinal McCloskey, the first American-born Cardinal, that was likely placed in the cornerstone.

The Gothic Revival church was built in 1880 to the designs of Lawrence J. O'Connor, of rough-cut brownstone. The plan called for the church to be 50 by 120 feet, with walls 56 feet high. The New York Times reported on August 16, 1880, that "the tower on the east side of the church will be 105 feet high, and over the main entrance will be a colossal cross". The cornerstone was laid August 15, 1880. At that point, the walls had risen twenty feet above ground level and over the basement level. The church was to be roofed in November 1880 and opened for worship around August 1881 at a cost of US$95,000.

New York City Police Department Capt. Berghold with 30 policeman kept the 2,000-person street crowd under control, as every seat within the enclosure of the un-roofed church was already occupied.

"The corner-stone bore a legend in Latin which translates as: 'His Eminence Cardinal McCloskey, Archbishop of New-York, laid the corner-stone of the new church of St. Leo, on the 15th day of August, 1880, the Feast of the Assumption of the Blessed Virgin Mary, Leo XIII being the reigning Pontiff of the Church. Rutherford B. Hayes, President of the United States of America; Alonzo B. Cornell, Governor of the State of New-York; Edward Cooper, Mayor of New-York; the Rev. Thomas J. Ducey, Pastor; the Rev. David J. Leahy, assistant, and Lawrence J. O'Connor, architect.' United States coins of all denominations, a picture of Pope Leo XIII, a large photograph of Cardinal McCloskey, attired in his large cape, copies of Catholic papers, and of New-York daily papers were placed in the corner-stone."

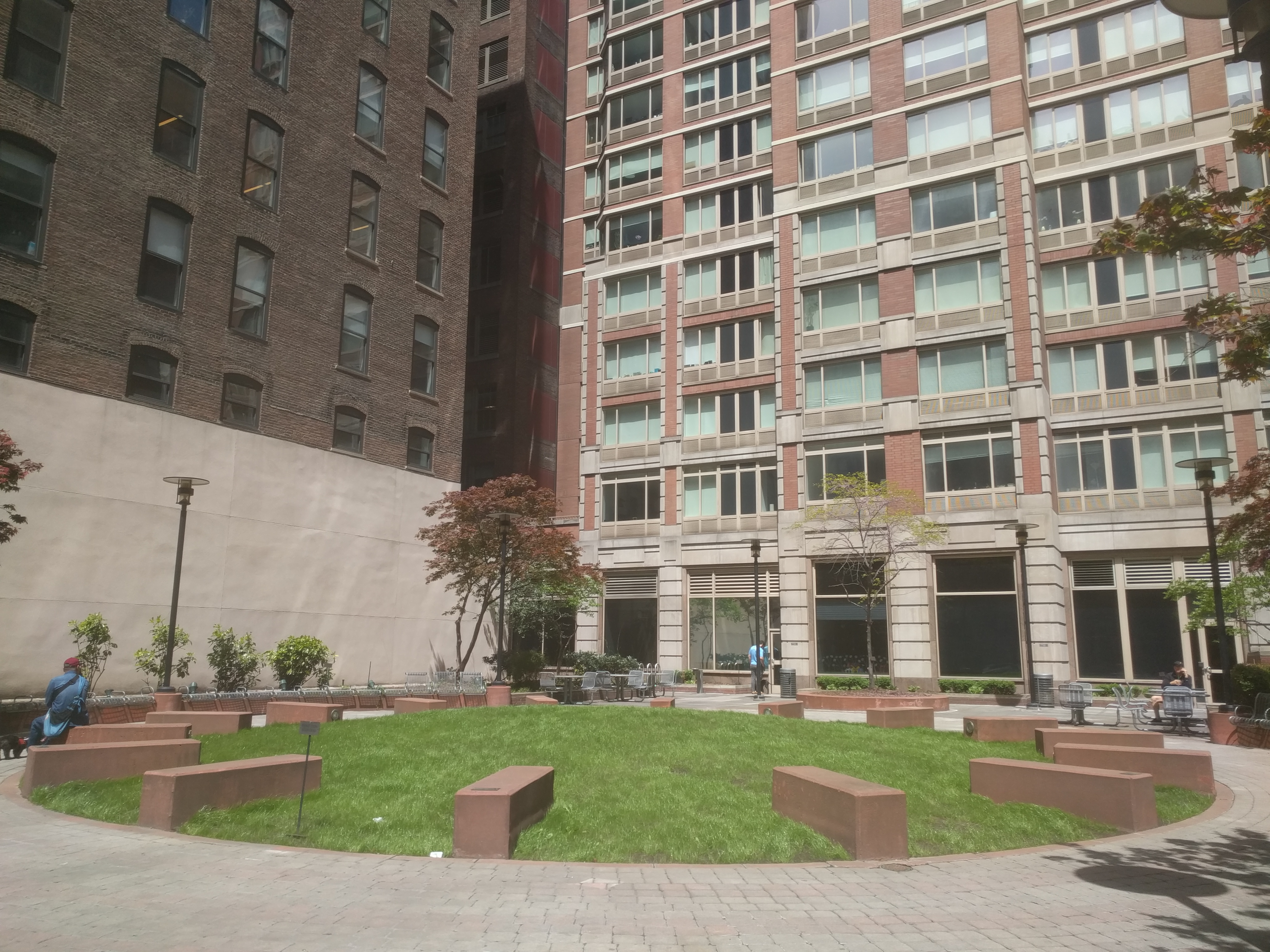
Church location is now a plaza

Cardinal McCloskey did not attend the ceremony because of ill health. The vicar general officiated, assisted by Rev. McQuirck, assistant priest at St. Patrick's Cathedral, the Rev. Frisbie, rector of St. Francis Xavier's College, the Rev. Salter of St. Joseph's, the Rev. Wyrich of St. Alphonso's Church, the Rev. Ducey, pastor of the new church.

The church and rectory-turned convent chapel and convent were eventually sold to a private developer and demolished in the 1980s. The site is now occupied by the plaza in front of the Madison Belvedere Apartments.

== Rev. Thomas J. Ducey (1843-1909) ==
Thomas James Ducey was born 4 February 1843 in Lismore, County Waterford, Ireland and emigrated to the USA with his parents, James and Margaret Walsh Ducey, in 1848. His mother found work as housekeeper for prominent lawyer James T. Brady, elder brother of Judge John R. Brady. Three years later Ducey was orphaned and the attorney took him in. Brady sent the boy to the College of St. Francis Xavier in Chelsea and employed him in his law office. Through Brady, young Ducey became acquainted with many of the city's wealthier Catholics, such as the Delmonicos.

Although Brady considered Ducey better suited to the practice of law, he entered St. Joseph's seminary in Troy, New York in 1864; he was ordained in December 1868. Even after he was ordained, Ducey continued to live at the Brady Mansion on West Twenty-Third Street. Ducey is described as a "flamboyant character with a flair for self-advertisement who combined a taste for high society with progressive views on social reform."

Ducey became assistant at the Church of the Nativity, Manhattan to the Rev. George McCloskey, older brother of Bishop William McCloskey of Louisville, who had also served as an assistant at Nativity under his brother. Ducey was also a volunteer chaplain at the Tombs Prison. When Brady suffered a stroke on the morning of February 7, 1869, His brother, Judge John R. Brady sent to Nativity for Ducey, who administered last rites and remained at his side until Brady died on the 9th. Brady left a substantial portion of his estate to the young priest.

During a series of sermons in 1871 and 1872, he denounced the Boss Tweed ring, who retaliated by trying to have him removed to a parish outside the city. However, Fr. Ducey had powerful friends and John Cardinal McCloskey, Archbishop of New York, refused and instead in September 1872 assigned Ducey as assistant at the Church of the Epiphany on Second Avenue. In May 1873 Ducey was assigned as assistant to John Lancaster Spalding at the Church of St. Michael on Ninth Avenue. In 1880, he was assigned to establish St. Leo's. Ducey donated $100,000 of his own funds towards construction. He died on 22 August 1909.
