= Church of St. Michael (34th Street, Manhattan) =

Church building in New York, US

Coordinates: 40°45′12.36″N 73°59′50.39″W

The Church of St. Michael
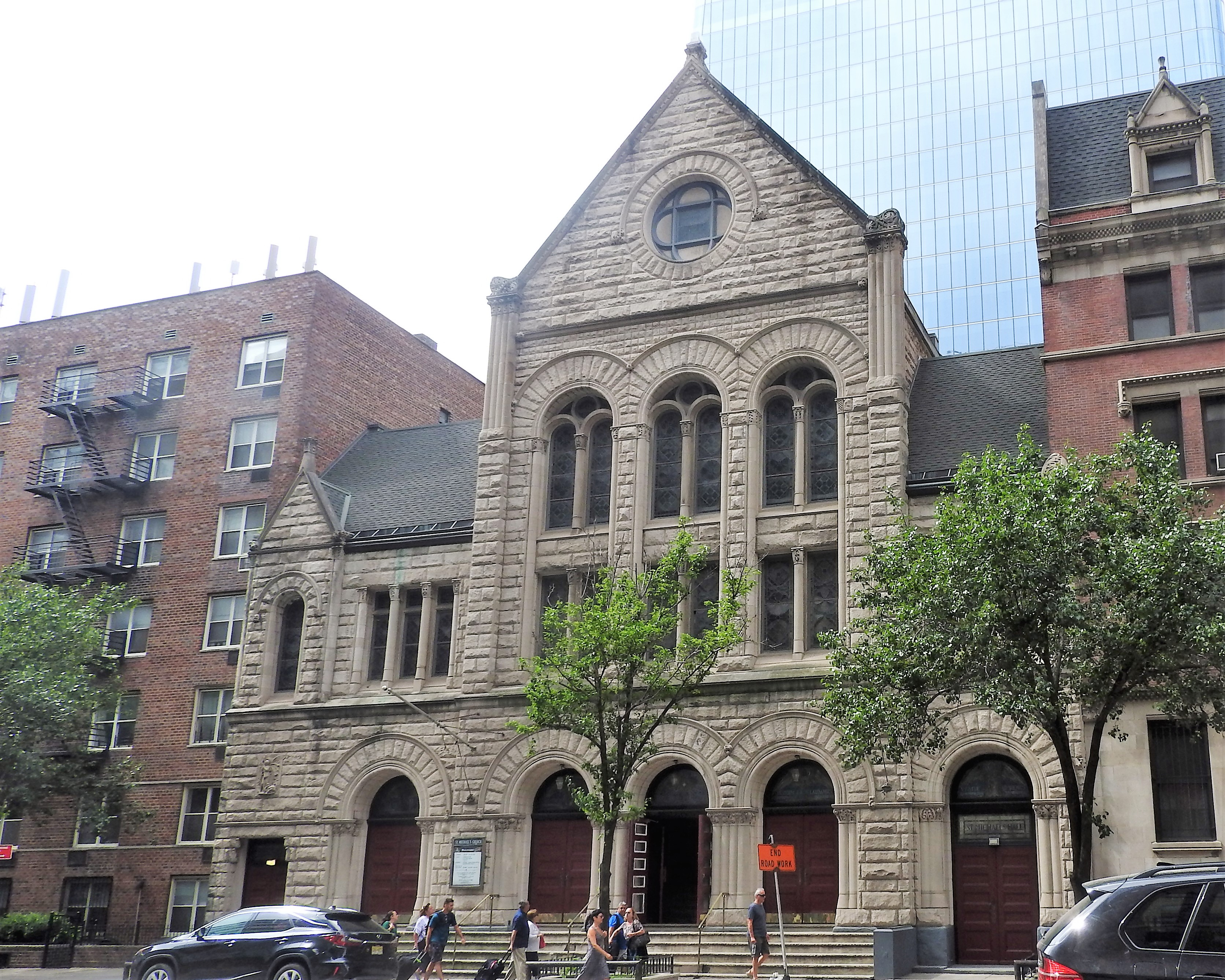
- Looking south across 34th Street (2019)
- Interactive map of the The Church of St. Michael area

General information
- Location: New York City, New York, United States
- Completed: 1907
- Client: Roman Catholic Archdiocese of New York

Design and construction
- Architect: Napoleon LeBrun & Sons

Website
- Church of St. Michael the Archangel

The Church of St. Michael is a parish church in the Roman Catholic Archdiocese of New York, located at 424 West 34th Street, in Manhattan, New York City.

== Churches ==
=== Original location ===
The parish was founded in 1857 as an offshoot of the Church of St. Columba and Holy Cross Church, with boundaries from "28th to 38th Street and from 6th Avenue to the banks of the Hudson." The community initially met in a chapel structure of renovated townhouses. The original church plan was begun in 1861 and completed in 1868, with a front on 31st Street, between 9th and 10th Avenues. The church was built in phases surrounding the chapel and without disturbing services there. When finally completed according to the original plans, it was 80 feet (24 m) wide by 200 feet (61 m) long and had a stone facade and 105-foot (32 m) high tower on 31st Street and an interior nuns' gallery on two sides. It was designed by the founding pastor, Arthur J. Donnelly (1820–1890), and architect T.S. Wall. The church complex also consisted of a rectory, convent and schools, the latter designed by architect Lawrence J. O'Connor, FAIA. During 1874–1884, the complex was the original home of the Presentation Sisters in the northeastern United States, and enrollment grew to become the largest parochial schools in New York. The Sisters and the parish also founded the Mount Saint Michael Home for destitute children, in Greenridge, Staten Island. The Manhattan church contained an 1862 Henry Erben mechanical action organ. On May 4, 1892, a fire destroyed much of the church and the organ.

=== Second location ===
O'Connor was contracted to design a new structure which incorporated the original tower and acquired a new Indiana bluff limestone facade on 32nd Street. Other details include a roof elevated six feet (two metres) higher than the original church, a vaulted ceiling, aisles with groined arches, fourteen Munich stained glass windows, and a gallery in the form of a choir loft with a new 1893 Odell organ at the rear of the church. The blessing Mass was scheduled for Sunday, January 28, 1894. The total dimensions were 75 feet (23 m) wide by 200 feet (61 m) long. In 1892, the address was listed at 408 West 32nd Street.

=== Third location ===
In 1904, the Pennsylvania Railroad Company began proceedings for the construction of the North River Tunnels and Pennsylvania Station, which would require the demolition of St. Michael's 32nd Street church and complex. At the suggestion of the pastor, John A. Gleeson, the Archdiocese sold the parish properties in exchange for a new church, school, convent, and rectory on 34th Street. The office of Napoleon LeBrun & Sons was responsible for the construction of the new complex, which involved the salvage and re-use of the altar, organ, stained glass windows, and limestone facade. The church was dedicated November 10, 1907. It was described at the time as Romanesque, 75 feet (23 m) wide by 200 feet (61 m) deep and 60 feet (18 m) high. It also had a 2,000-person basement chapel with an 18-foot-high (5.5 m) ceiling.

In June 2018, Pastor George W. Rutler dedicated a shrine in the church to Our Lady of Aradin for persecuted Christians. The church underwent renovations in 2019, including a new red oak baldachin designed by Patrick Alles, which received the McKim, Mead & White Award for Craftsmanship and Artisanship from the Institute of Classical Architecture and Art.

== Religious vocations ==
St. Michael's parish and schools have produced hundreds of priests and religious vocations, including at least two bishops: Daniel Joseph Curley and Thomas John McDonnell.
