= Lorenzo Delmonico =

American restaurateur (1813–1881)

- Born: March 13, 1813; Mairengo, Ticino, Switzerland
- Died: September 3, 1881 (aged 68); Sharon Springs, New York, US
- Occupation: Restaurateur
- Spouse: Clemence Chanon Miege (m. 1856)

Lorenzo Delmonico (March 13, 1813 – September 3, 1881) was an American restaurateur. An immigrant from the Swiss canton of Ticino, he worked at his uncles' Delmonico's restaurant in Manhattan and later became full manager in 1848, overseeing both an expansion of the business and his own catering services.

== Biography ==
=== Early life ===
Delmonico was born on March 13, 1813, in Mairengo, Ticino, Switzerland; his parents Francesco Delmonico and Rosa Longhi were farmers. In 1831, he moved to the United States to join his uncles Pietro and Giovanni, co-founders of the Delmonico's restaurant in New York City. Despite his lack of business experience, he was known to be (in historian Jerome Mushkat's words) a "quick learner with keen business instincts" and was hired by the uncles as a junior partner.

=== Career ===
Delmonico and his uncles pioneered several aspects of American culinary taste by "turning the preparation and serving of food into a gastronomic art", including 24-hour opening, English-language dish names, affordability, and the introduction of fine European cuisine. They also introduced agricultural techniques imported from their native Switzerland to their own produce, grown on their Brooklyn farm. Delmonico himself ran Hotel Delmonico, a hostelry with à la carte meals and a bar, from c.1846 to 1854.

Following the deaths of the uncles, Delmonico gained full control of the restaurant's management in 1848. With the growth of the local middle and upper class, he later opened more restaurants while retaining the original. A contemporary New York Times article remarked that Delmonico's name was synonymous with perfect gastronomy. Mushkat reputed Delmonico for having "established himself as the leading American epicure" by the 1850s, and credited him with "chang[ing] the traditional American diet and [turning] eating into a form of entertainment". His skills were noticed by president Abraham Lincoln, who told him after eating at Delmonico's: "In Washington, where I live, there are many mansions, but no cooks like yours". He also worked as a caterer for many elite events in the city, including weddings; his most expensive catering job was a massive dinner served by Morton Peto.

In addition to business, Delmonico involved himself in philanthropy, including Catholic institutions and a school in his native Mairengo. In the early-1860s, he invested in an oil company which subsequently collapsed, incurring $500,000 in debts which he paid off with restaurant profits.

=== Personal life ===
Delmonico married Clemence Chanon Miege, a French widow who lived in New York City, in 1856. They had no children, though he had two stepchildren from his wife's late previous husband. He was a cigar smoker.

Delmonico died on September 3, 1881, in Sharon Springs, New York. following years of illness which had exacerbated in the past few months. His funeral was held at St. Ann Church on September 7, with several prominent dignitaries (Note: More specifically, Samuel L. M. Barlow I, Charles K. Graham, Arthur Leary, aldermen John J. Morris and Jordan L. Mott, and NYC Police Commissioner James Kelso) present and the mass addressed by Thomas J. Ducey. The Delmonico's restaurants were closed for funeral day.
