= Lawrence J. O'Connor =

American architect

- Died: 1900; New York, New York
- Known for: Lawrence J. O’Connor, Architect

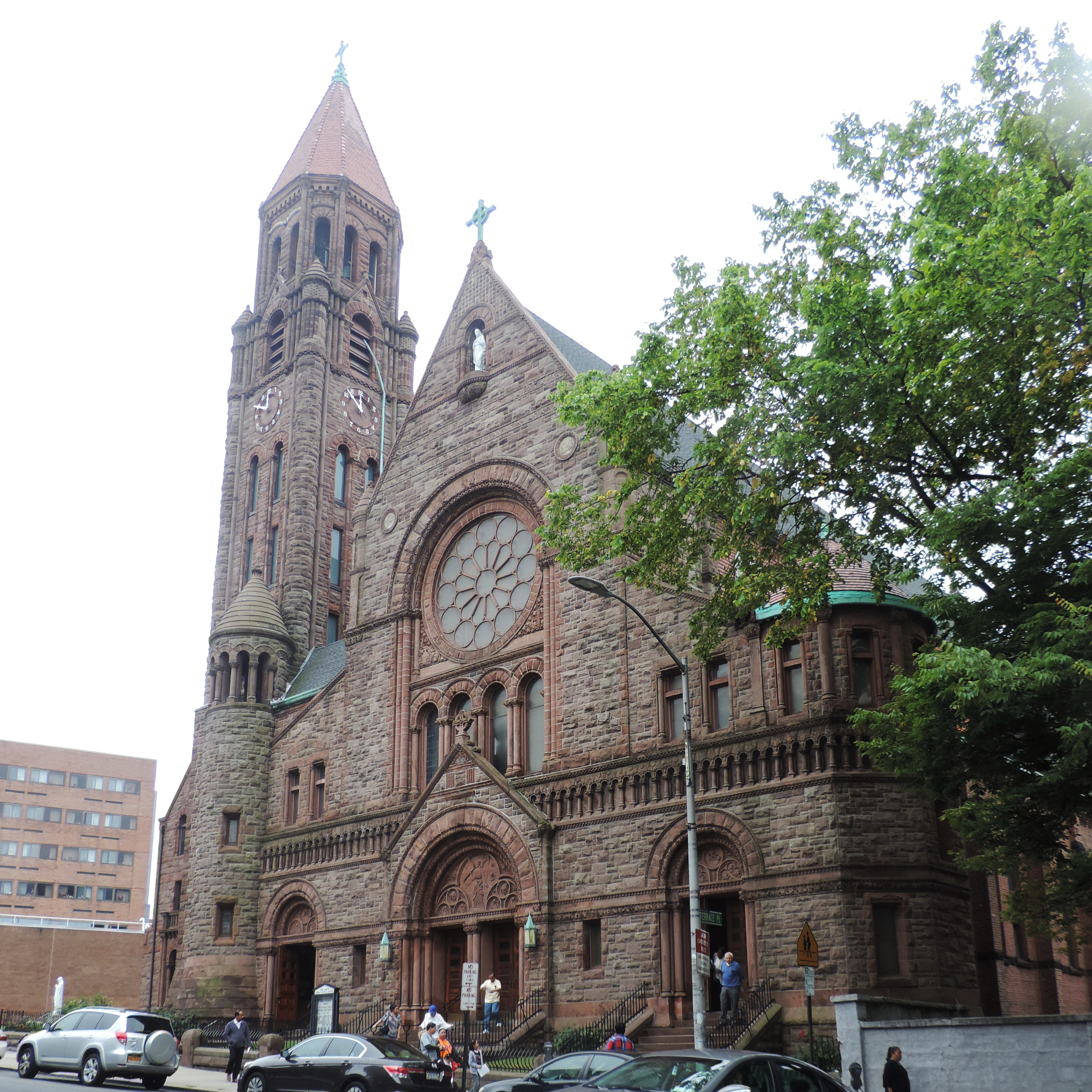
Immaculate Conception Church in Yonkers

Lawrence J. O'Connor, FAIA (d. 1900) was an American architect who designed a number of churches, schools, convents and rectories in New York, New Jersey, and Washington, D.C. He was a named a fellow of the American Institute of Architects in 1892.

== Architectural practice ==
Many of his important buildings have been lost over the years. One particularly tragic loss was that of St. Agnes' Church (Manhattan) on 42nd Street, Manhattan, which has since been rebuilt in a similar but more modern style.

== Works include ==
- Holy Cross Church (Manhattan) School (1887) located behind the church at 332 West 43rd Street (and renovations of original church by Henry Engelbert)
- Holy Cross School (Manhattan)
- Annunciation Church (Morristown, New Jersey)
- Our Lady of Mt. Carmel Church (Manhattan)
- St. Veronica's Church (Manhattan) Rectory
- Cathedral of the Immaculate Conception (Syracuse, New York) (originally St. Mary Church, renovated for Cathedral use in 1904 by Archimedes Russell)
- St. Agnes' Church (Manhattan), (burned in 1992, elements of the O'Connor building were retained in the new church of 1998 including 2 exterior towers)
- St. Joseph's Church (Manhattan) (demolished)
- St. Leo's Church (New York City), Manhattan, demolished
- St. Mary's Church (Manhattan) (renovations)
- St. Michael's Church (completed 1894 on W. 31st St. in Manhattan, it was later disassembled and reconstructed on W. 34th St. as a result of the building of Pennsylvania Station) https://web.archive.org/web/20140517152342/http://www.stmichaelnyc.org/multimedia/church-of-st.-michael-centennial-book
- Immaculate Conception Church (Yonkers, New York)
- Resurrection Church (Rye, New York), demolished and replaced by a church of the same name built to the designs of Henry V. Murphy)
- St. Patrick's Church, Washington, DC
- St. Columbkille Church, Brighton, Boston, Massachusetts, built 1871-80
