= St. John the Baptist Church (Manhattan) =

Catholic church in New York City

Church of St. John the Baptist
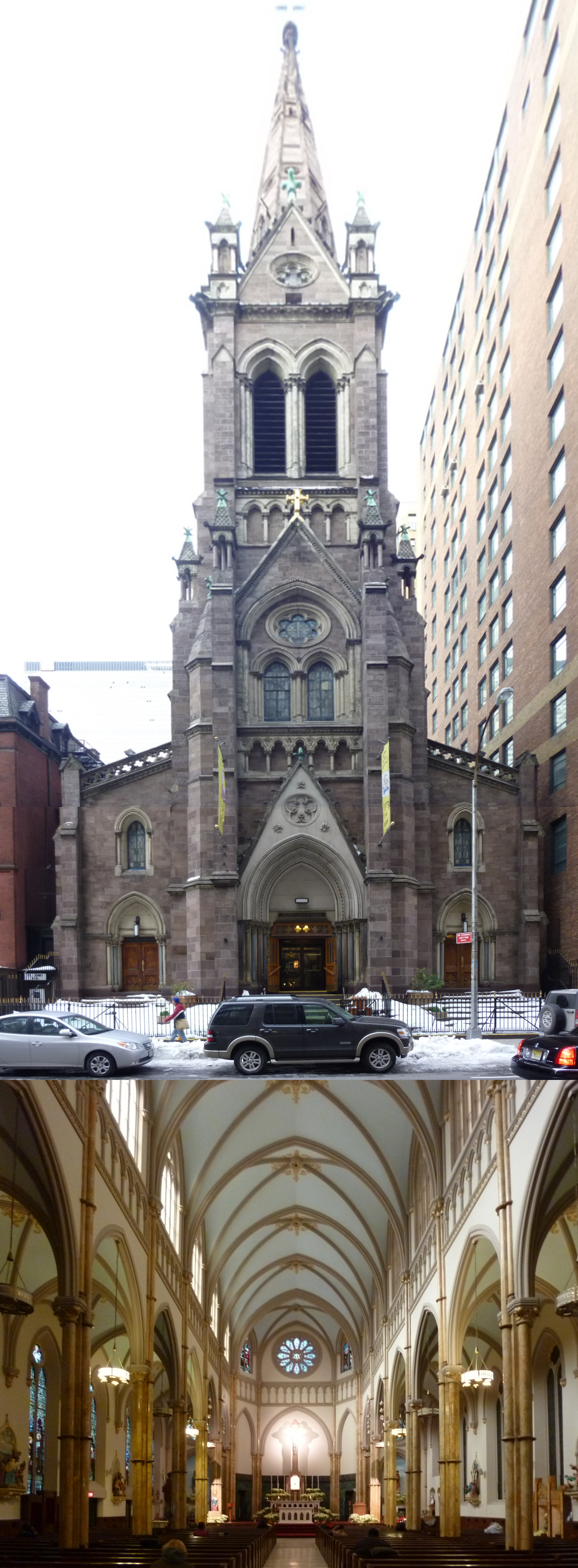
- 30th Street facade of church and interior (2011)
- Interactive map of the Church of St. John the Baptist area

General information
- Architectural style: Gothic Revival of the French Gothic style (for 1871–1872 church); Brutalist (for monastery)
- Location: Manhattan, New York, U.S.
- Coordinates: 40°44′56″N 73°59′35″W
- Construction started: 1840 (for first church); 1847 (for second church); 1871 (for present church); 1888 (for tower)
- Completed: 1840 (for first church); 1872 (for present church); 1872 (for former monastery); 1891 (for tower); 1893 (for "casino")
- Demolished: 1847 (for first church fire)
- Cost: $175,000 (for 1871–1872 church)
- Client: Archdiocese of New York

Technical details
- Structural system: Sandstone masonry

Design and construction
- Architect: Napoleon Le Brun (for 1871–1872 church)

Website
- christinthecity.nyc

The Church of St. John the Baptist is a Catholic parish church in the Archdiocese of New York, at 211 West 30th Street between Seventh and Eighth Avenues in the Garment District of the Chelsea neighborhood of Manhattan in New York City. To the church's rear is the former Capuchin Monastery of St. John the Baptist, located at 210 West 31st Street across from New York Penn Station and Madison Square Garden. The Capuchin Order served the parish for nearly 175 years (1852–2026).

In 2015, the parish of St. John the Baptist Church merged with the parish of Holy Cross Church on West 42nd Street.

== History ==
The parish was established in 1840 as the second parish to serve German Catholics in New York City, after St. Nicholas Church, on East 2nd Street, which was established in 1833. A historian noted: "Both German parishes had lay trustees that were so overbearing that they drove out several pastors."

The first church erected was a small timber structure. It was dedicated on September 20, 1840. The first pastor was an Austrian-Hungarian friar, Zachary Kunz, O.F.M., who, following disharmony with the lay board of trustees, resigned in 1844. Kunz left with a portion of the congregation and founded the nearby Church of St. Francis of Assisi. The problems were so great with the board of trustees that, following the resignation of Kunz, the parish of St. John the Baptist was placed under interdict until 1845 when J. A. Jakob became its second pastor. More disagreements ensued and the church was again closed in June 1846. It variously reopened with different pastors, but burned down on January 10, 1847.

John Hughes, the Archbishop of New York, laid the cornerstone for a new brick church on the site on March 14, 1847. Until 1851, pastorship of the parish was assumed by the Church of the Nativity until Joseph Lutz was appointed pastor. Four months later, the parish was again under interdict. Lutz explained: "On account of the obstinacy of the parishioners this church was closed and the administration of the Sacraments prohibited by order of His Grace" (November 24, 1851). P. J. Matschejewski arrived as pastor on March 7, 1852 but remained only two weeks. At that point, Hughes requested the assistance of the Hungarian Capuchin province to administer the parish. Augustine Danter, O.M.Cap., was appointed as pastor in 1852 and remained until 1869, when he was obliged to retire, after which the church remained closed for some months.

In response to the many disputes, Archbishop of New York Cardinal John McCloskey, suppressed St. John the Baptist in 1870 and requested that the newly-founded American province of the Capuchin Friars assume complete control of a resurrected parish. Under the Capuchins, especially its second Capuchin pastor, the Swiss-born Bonventura Frey, O.M.Cap., parish animosity dissipated. Under Frey, the German congregation began to erect the present substantial church. Frey left in 1879 to serve as the Minister Provincial of the Capuchins friars in the United States, and moved to their headquarters in Calvary, Wisconsin. He returned from 1888 to 1891 to prepare the parish for its Golden Jubilee. In 1914 the membership of the parish was 1,500.

In the early 20th century one of the parish's priests was the (now) Blessed Solanus Casey, O.F.M. Cap. After serving the parish for some 175 years, the Capuchin friars withdrew from the parish on June 30, 2026, Michael Ramos, O.F.M. Cap., having served as its last Capuchin pastor.

== Buildings ==
The present French Gothic-style stone church was built between 1871 and 1872 to the designs of the prolific ecclesiastical architect Napoleon LeBrun, architect of several New York Catholic churches as well as the cathedral in Philadelphia. The cornerstone was laid by Fr. Frey on Pentecost Sunday, June 4 or June 11 of 1871. The church is 165 feet long and 67 feet wide, originally accommodating 1,200 people, and costing $175,000 to construct.

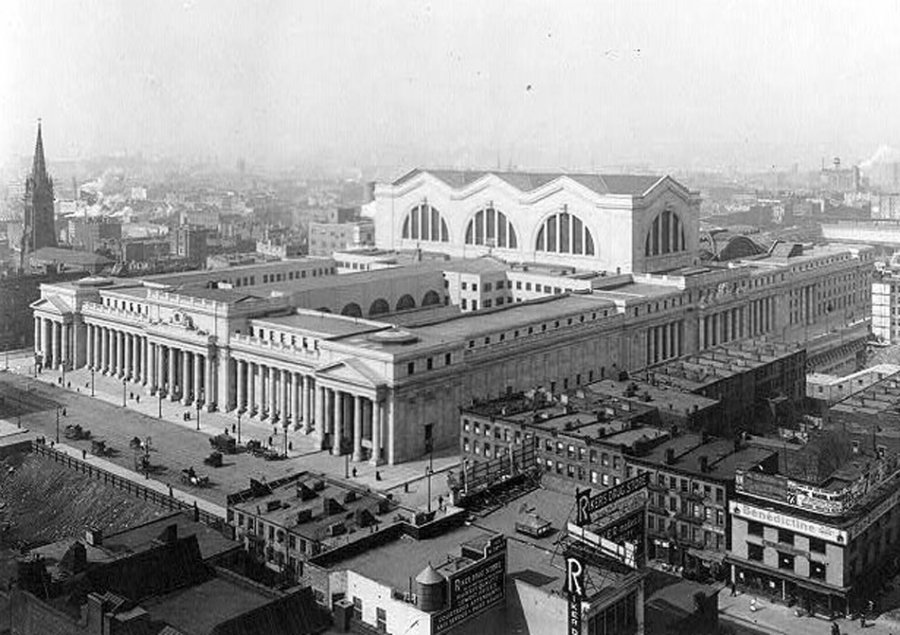
View from the northeast, c. 1911, depicting the church (at left) in relation to the then new Penn Station

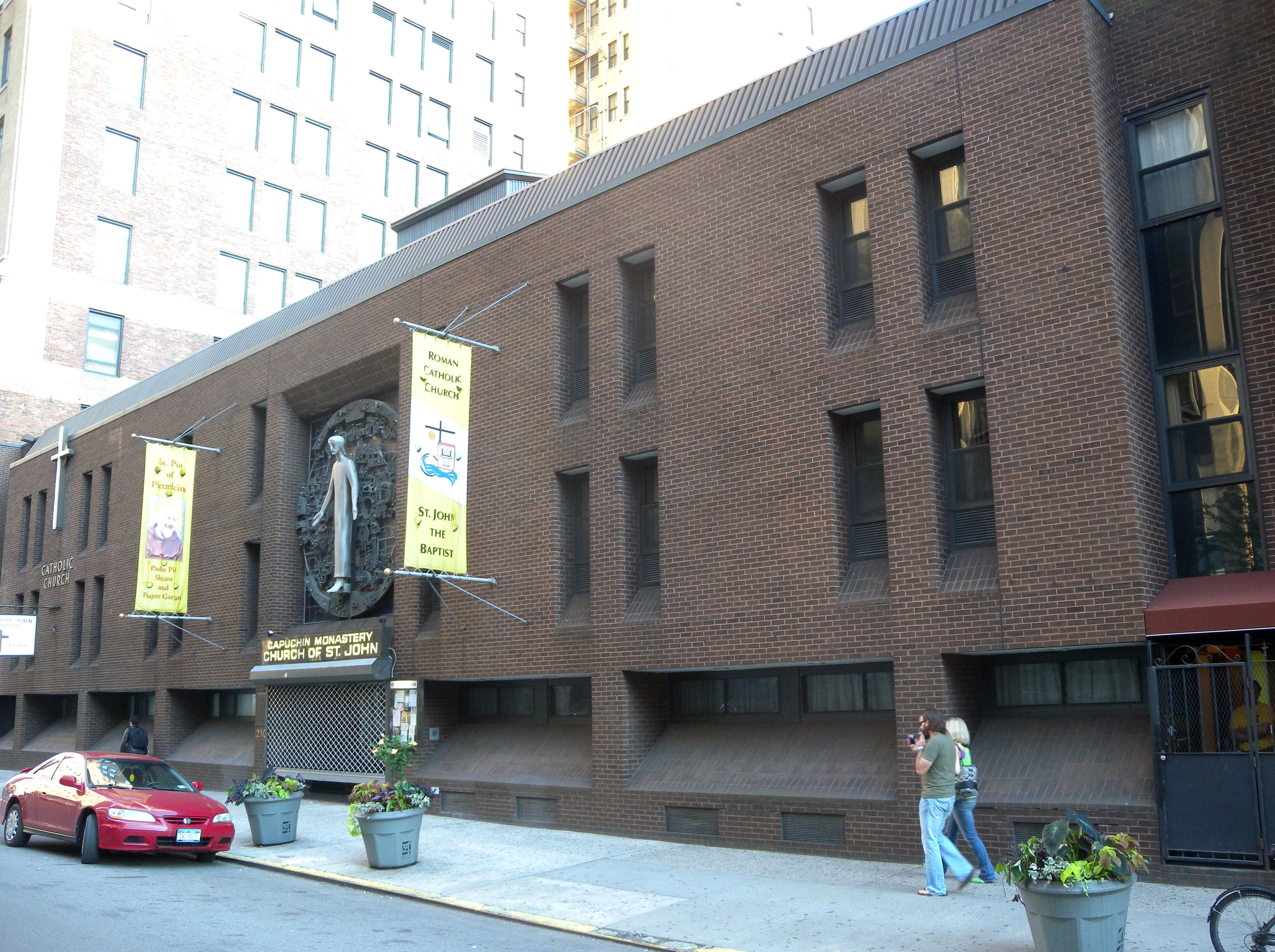
The Capuchin Convent of St. John the Baptist on 31st Street, facing Madison Square Garden

Fr. Frey returned to the parish in 1888 and built the central bell tower in preparation for the church's Golden Jubilee held on January 18–19, 1891 and marked by Archbishop Michael Corrigan, Bishop Wigger of Newark, Archbishop-elect Katzer of Milwaukee and Abbott H. Pfraengle of Newark. The tower has a carillon of five swinging bells cast by the J.G. Stuckstede & Brothers Foundry in St. Louis, Missouri. The peal still rings each day. The church was dedicated on June 23, 1872, by Archbishop John Cardinal McClosky, the first American cardinal.

In preparation for the church's 125th anniversary, it underwent a complete renovation, which lasted several years. The church was re-dedicated on June 24, 1996, the feast day of its patron saint, by Cardinal John Joseph O'Connor, Archbishop of New York. The church's organ and choir gallery, as well as a number of statues and stained-glass windows, were destroyed in a fire on January 10, 1997. The damage was eventually repaired and the organ was replaced with an electronic one.

According to bronze memorial plaques affixed to the wall of the narthex, for the 160th anniversary of the parish and the Great Jubilee Year of 2000, the bell tower was restored by funds provided by Antonio D'Urso and his wife Giovanna Parpo in 2000. The rededication of the St. Joseph, Ave Maria, St. Clare, St. Fidelis Bells were the gift of Kevin Ward, blessed November 30, 1890 by Archbishop McClosky and rededicated November 7, 1998, by Father Bernard Smith, O.F.M, Cap., the Provincial of the Capuchins.

The AIA Guide to New York City (2010) described the church as "a Roman Catholic Trinity. The interior of white, radiates light. Worth a special visit." In January 2020, an expansion of New York Penn Station, to be called Penn South, was proposed.. The proposal would require demolition of the entire block between Eighth and Seventh Avenues, West 31st to 30th Streets.

The brown brick Capuchin Monastery of St. John the Baptist was built in 1974 in the Brutalist style. It was sold to a retail property developer in 2016.

== School ==
Fr. Frey had opened a school in a hotel on Sixth Avenue with 50 children during the winter of 1870–1871. An additional floor was added to the rectory to accommodate the school and the Marist Brothers who were in charge of the boys. The Sisters of St. Dominic were in charge of the girls. A four-storey-over-basement Collegiate Gothic monastery block of four bays wide and two bays deep was built behind the church, opening April 19, 1872. The school for young men was opened April 7, 1893. In 1914, the school had 160 boys 200 girls, in the charge of four Marist Brothers and six Dominican Sisters, respectively.
