= Thomas J. McCluskey =

Father Thomas J. McCluskey Jr. S.J.
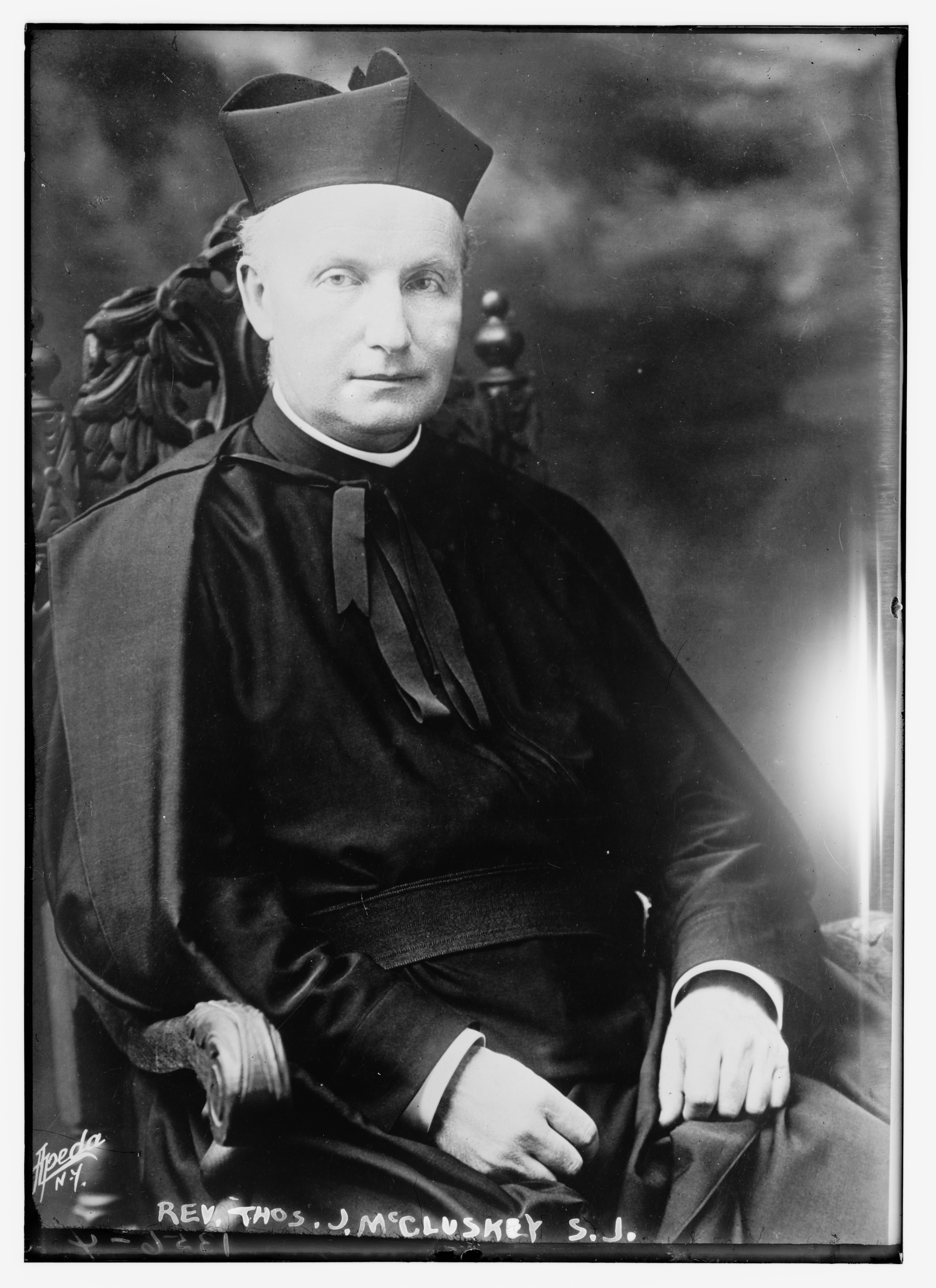
- Born: July 31, 1857; New York, New York
- Died: July 13, 1937 (aged 79); New York, New York
- Occupations: University President, Priest

Academic background
- Education: La Salle University, Manhattan College

Fr. Thomas Joseph McCluskey, S.J. (1857–1937) was the twentieth president of Fordham University. He was appointed in 1911, when the institution had a debt of $600,000. He founded a school of pharmacy in 1912, and reorganized the university's school of medicine, resulting in its placement in class A by the American Medical Association in 1914.

== Early life and career ==
Born in 1857 in New York, Thomas McCluskey attended De La Salle Institute and Manhattan College and graduated from the latter in 1874. He earned an M.A. degree in 1880, as well as studying at St. Joseph's Theological Seminary and Woodstock College, receiving both Ph.D. and S.T.D. degrees. He was ordained a priest of the archdiocese in 1880 and named vice-rector of St. Leo's Church in New York City in 1881, a role in which he served until 1889. In 1889, McCluskey joined the Society of Jesus, and in 1894 he became assistant rector of St. Ignatius Church, New York. He was appointed pastor of the Church of St. Francis Xavier, New York in 1897, where he remained until becoming a professor of classics at St. Louis University and Boston College in 1902. In 1906, McCluskey became vice-president of the Jesuit Collegium Maximum at Woodstock, Maryland, and in 1907 he was appointed president of the College of St. Francis Xavier, New York. He served as president of St. Francis Xavier for four years before being appointed to Fordham University in 1911, at the age of fifty-four, and served in the role until 1915.

== Fordham University ==
When McCluskey was appointed president of Fordham University in 1911, the institution had a debt of $600,000. To help mitigate this financial problem, McCluskey founded a school of pharmacy in 1912, which would prosper for several decades before being closed due to low enrollment in 1972.

The University's School of Medicine underwent a reorganization shortly after the appointment of McCluskey as university president, resulting in the resignation of the school's dean, pro-dean, and several faculty members. Aside from the resulting new appointments, the medical school began to prosper and gain a favorable reputation during this period, and was moved into its newly completed building in 1913. In 1914, the medical school was placed in class A by the American Medical Association.

Father McCluskey died in 1937 at the age of 79, at St. Vincent's Hospital in New York.
