= William Ranney =

American painter (1813–1957)

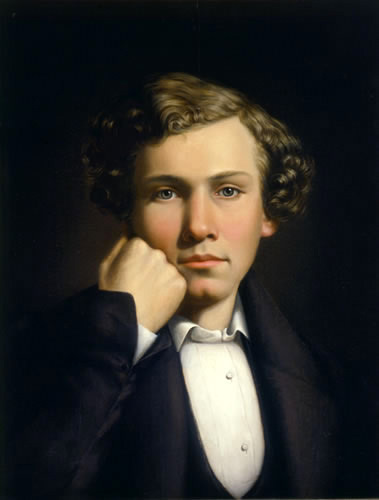
- 1839 self-portrait
- Born: William Tylee Ranney; May 9, 1813; Middletown, Connecticut, US
- Died: November 18, 1857 (aged 44); West Hoboken, New Jersey, US (now Union City)
- Resting place: Bergen Cemetery, New Jersey, US
- Known for: Portrait painting

William Tylee Ranney (May 9, 1813 – November 18, 1857) was an American painter, known for his depictions of Western life, sporting scenery, historical subjects and portraiture. In his 20-year career, he made 150 paintings and 80 drawings, and is considered the first major genre painter to work in New Jersey, and one of the most important pre-Civil War American painters. His work is on display in several museums across the United States. One of his contemporaries opined, "A specimen of Ranney is indispensable wherever a collection of American art exists".

== Early life ==
William Tylee Ranney was born in Middletown, Connecticut on May 9, 1813, the son of William Ranney, a sea captain, and Clarissa Ranney. In 1826, at the age of 13, he moved to Fayetteville, North Carolina, to live with his maternal uncle, merchant William Nott, and be apprenticed as a tinsmith. It is believed that Ranney developed his first sketches during this period.

At the age of 20 Ranney moved to Brooklyn in 1833 to study painting. On March 12, 1836, six days after the fall of the Alamo, he volunteered in the Texas Army to fight in the Texas War of Independence under General Sam Houston. His experience during this period is understood as the most significant influence on the subject matter of his future works. Ranney was reportedly in the guard placed over Mexican President Santa Anna following his capture at the Battle of San Jacinto. Ranney's nine-month tenure in the Texas Army ended on November 23, 1836. He remained in West Columbia, Texas until returning to Brooklyn in 1837.

== Career ==
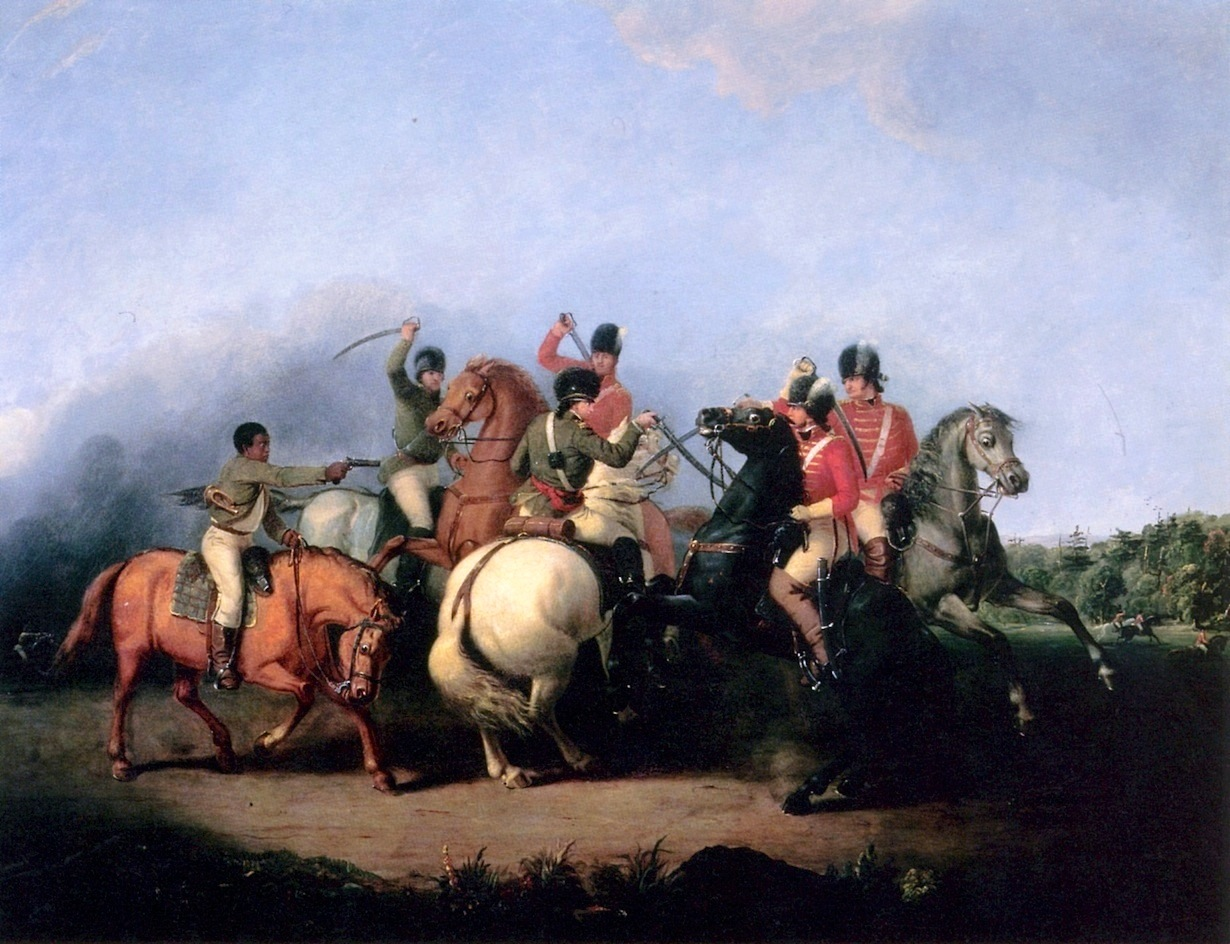
The Battle of Cowpens, painted by William Ranney in 1845. The scene depicts an unnamed black man (left), thought to be Colonel William Washington's waiter, firing his pistol and saving the life of Colonel Washington (on white horse in center).

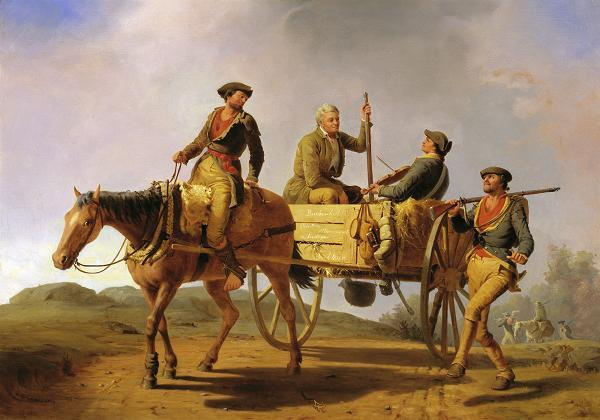
Veterans of 1776 Returning from the War, 1848, Dallas Museum of Art.

Ranney resumed his artistic endeavors in Brooklyn, becoming a self-taught oil painter, having never received formal training. In 1838, he publicly exhibited his paintings for the first time at the National Academy of Design in New York City. He received an award for his first genre painting A Courting Scene, which was exhibited at the New York Mechanics' Institute Fair. He traveled back and forth between North Carolina and New York from 1839 and 1842. In 1843, he opened a studio in New York City, where he advertised as a portrait painter, though few of the works from this period have been identified.

In 1847, he moved to Weehawken, marrying Margaret Agnes O'Sullivan the following year. He and his wife briefly moved back to New York City around 1850.

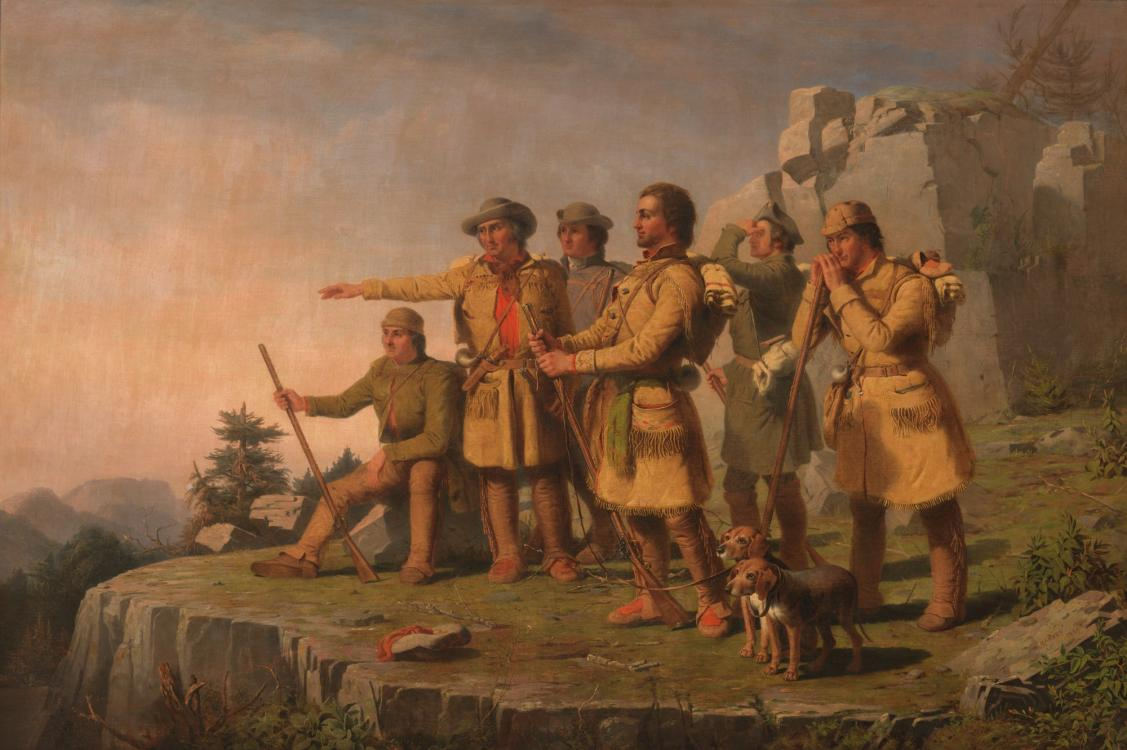
Boone's First View of Kentucky, William Tylee Ranney (1849)

In 1853, they crossed back into New Jersey, settling permanently with their two sons at a 14-room homestead in the growing artist community of West Hoboken, New Jersey, which today is the southern portion of Union City. The homestead, which was located at Twelfth Street and Palisade Avenue atop the then-rural Hudson Palisades, and overlooked the Manhattan skyline, was characterized by Ranney's interests in both painting and Western life. It included a two-story, glassed-in studio, and a stable for horses that Ranney, an avid horseback rider, painted in many of his works. Henry T. Tuckerman, in his Book of the Artists, described Ranney's studio thus:

It was so constructed as to receive animals; guns, pistols, and cutlasses hung on the walls; and these, with curious saddles and primitive riding gear, might lead a visitor to imagine he had entered a pioneer's cabin or border chieftain's hut; such an idea would, however, have been once dispelled by glance at the many sketches and studies which proclaimed that an artist, and not a bushranger, had here found a home.

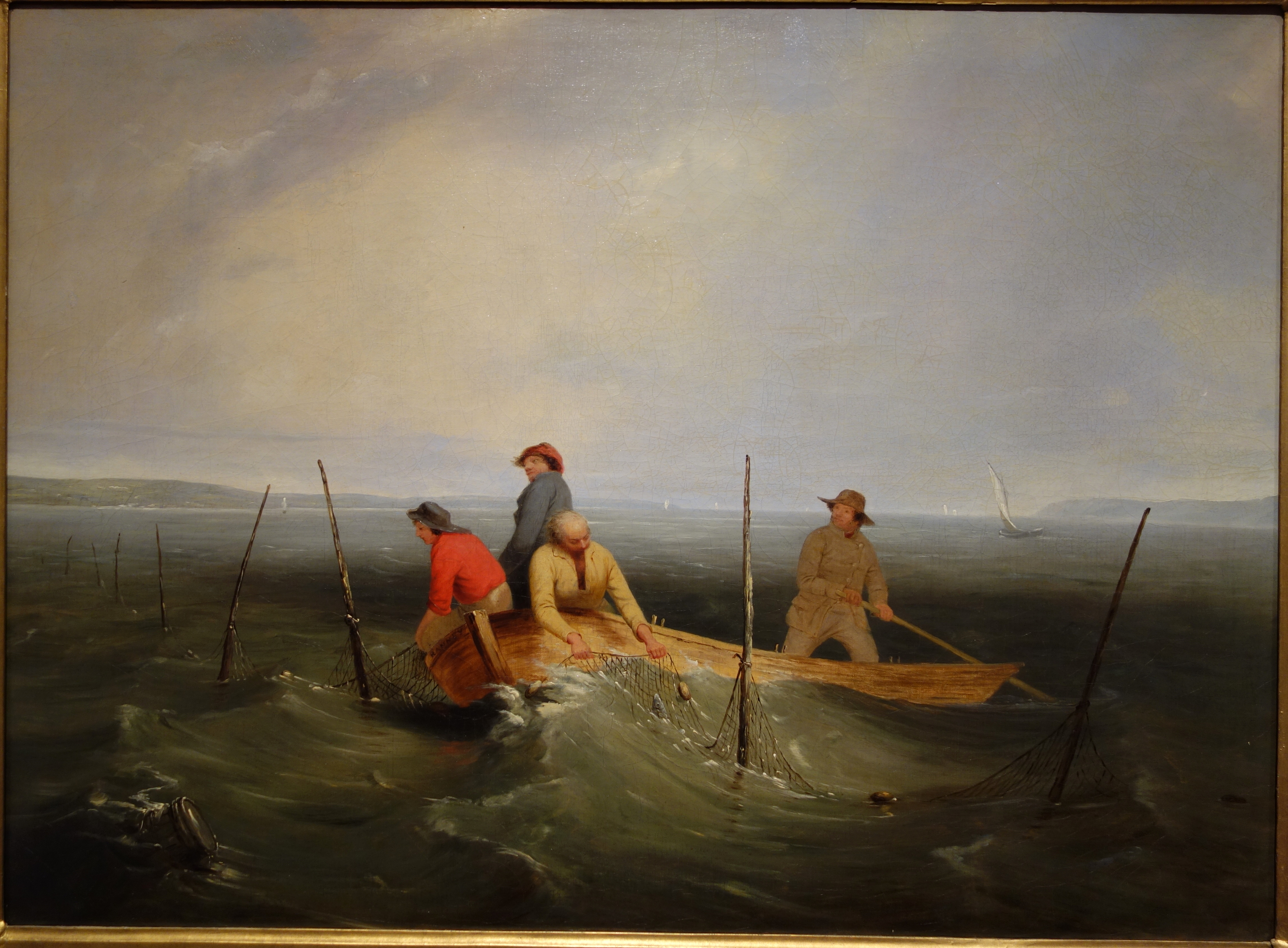
Shad Fishing on the Hudson by William Tylee Ranney, 1846, oil on canvas - New Britain Museum of American Art

Ranney was a regular contributor and an associate member of the National Academy of Design and the American Art Union, both based in New York. He also painted historical scenes, such as those of the American Revolution. He mostly depicted the everyday lives of the affected populace rather than heroic battle scenes. Among his subjects of local landscapes was Hackensack Meadows.

By 1846, his work began to show the influences of his experiences in Texas, including frontier backdrops depicting the Rocky Mountains. He featured pioneers, hunters, trappers, and explorers before the West was more widely settled by European Americans. Among these are The Old Oaken Bucket, The Match Boy, Prairie Burial, Scouting Party, Hunting Wild Horses and Trapper's Last Shot, which are straightforward presentations of everyday subjects, lacking overt sentiment.

Ranney enjoyed duck hunting, which is reflected in some of his paintings noted for their solidly constructed, almost sculpture-like figures. His most popular and requested work is his 1850 painting On the Wing, which portrays a sportsman with dead game at his feet, about to shoot down his next target. Ranney produced at least four different versions of this print, the most recognized of which was reserved for the Butler Institute of American Art. It was published in the gift book Ornaments of Memory in 1856 and 1857. This version is set in a more windblown environment, noted for the contrast generated with the stillness of the human figures within it. The portrayal of the outdoorsman in On the Wing contributed to the era's nationalistic imagery. Mark Thistelthwaite of the Butler Institute, describes this piece as:

Capital, in its style. Sportsman and dog are both in the best spirits, and are transferred to the canvas without losing anything of their keen relish of the sport". The appeal of Ranney's painting lies in its convincing portrayal of the alert, poised hunter and the tense, crouching boy and dog, all motionless, yet charged with potential energy. Dead game on the ground underscore the figures' vitality. Ranney plants the compactly rendered, centralized group in the midst of wind-blown marsh vegetation.

Ranney, who adored the rural, marshy lands that typified the area in the 19th century, also enjoyed fishing. Among the fellow artists and residents he befriended were Hoboken founding father Colonel John Stevens III, who organized the first ferry system between New York and Hoboken. As Ranney was an avid cricket player, he was one of the founders of New York Cricket Club, and one of its top scorers. The club met at the Elysian Fields in Hoboken. He also played Hoboken's Fox Hill, which today is Columbus Park, and the high school field between 9th and 11th streets on Grand Street. Ranney played cricket until 1854.

== Death and legacy ==
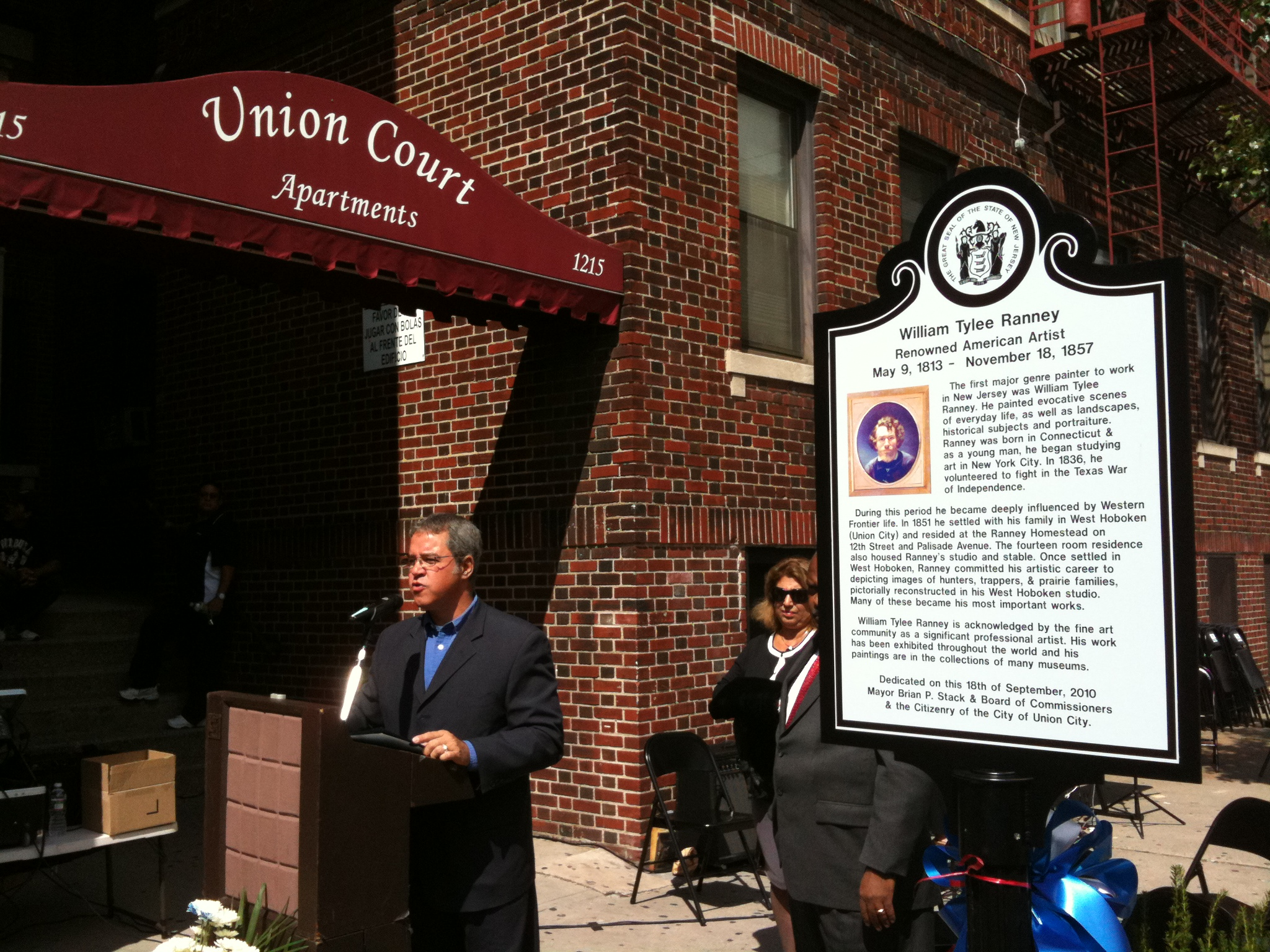
Union City, New Jersey Commissioner Lucio P. Fernandez at the September 18, 2010 dedication ceremony of the William Ranney historical marker, placed where Ranney's home once stood, at 1215 Palisade Avenue

Ranney converted to Catholicism during the last days of his life. He died of tuberculosis at his West Hoboken home on November 18, 1857, aged 44. Ranney's funeral took place at Saint Mary's Roman Catholic Church in Hoboken, and was attended by fellow painter Charles Loring Elliott. Ranney was buried in Bergen Cemetery.

The following year, the Ranney Fund put on an exhibition and sale in New York in order to raise money for Margaret Ranney and her two sons. Friend and patron, noted New York attorney James T. Brady gave a lecture on American art to help defray expenses of the Exhibition. Some of Ranney's works were exhibited at the National Academy of Design, and many of Ranney's fellow artists, including George Inness, Jasper Francis Cropsey and Asher Brown Durand, donated paintings for this effort, helping to raise over $7000. Some of the money was used to pay a lien on Ranney's house.

Ranney is regarded as one of the most important pre-Civil War American painters, and his paintings are highly prized by Western and early American art collectors. Sixty percent of his paintings are in museums such as the Boston Museum of Fine Arts. His work can also be viewed at the Corcoran Art Gallery in Washington, DC; the Thomas Gilcrease Institute of American History and Art in Tulsa, Oklahoma; the Buffalo Bill Historical Center in Cody, Wyoming; and the Archer M. Huntington Art Gallery in Austin, Texas.

Ranney's great-grandson, Ranney Moran, wrote the prologue for the 2006 book, Forging an American Identity: The Art of William Ranney.

On September 18, 2010, Union City, New Jersey dedicated a historical marker identifying the site of Ranney's former estate at 1215 Palisade Avenue.
