= Eugene V. Clark =

Eugene Vincent Clark (January 26, 1926 – April 11, 2012) was a prelate of the Archdiocese of New York. He was a vocal and prominent proponent of traditional values and practices in the Catholic Church.

== Career ==
Clark studied for the priesthood at St. Joseph's Seminary in Yonkers, New York. He was ordained by Cardinal Francis Spellman in 1951. He then served as a teacher at Cardinal Spellman High School in the Bronx, New York. Following this, he served as Spellman's private secretary.

=== Church of the Annunciation, Crestwood, New York ===
Clark was appointed pastor of the Church of the Annunciation in 1980 by Cardinal Terence Cooke. He was a successful homilist and a connoisseur of art, especially religious art. With his eye for the aesthetic, he refurbished much of the sculpture in the lower church, and moved several pieces to the upper church — including a Pieta and an enormous crucifix that now hangs in the back of the upper church. Clark oversaw a major restoration of the sanctuary of the upper church; this included a large marble altar, the altar stairs, and marble facade redesigned to face forward — replacing the "portable" altar used for several years previously. The altar is now dedicated to the memory of Richard and Regina Fay.

A hand-made papier-mâché Christmas creche imported from Italy was acquired at this time as well — with the help of the Mark and Alicia Barry Family, in Memory of Frank and Catherine Gleason. This work of art graces St. Joseph's Altar. Clark's successor, the Rev. Eugene Carrella, later commissioned the addition of a manger that replicates the marble columns and facade of the main altar.

Clark was the first pastor to institute a Finance Council in the parish. He was also dedicated to the parish school and a more diverse curriculum. Under his stewardship and with Kevin Scanlon as the school principal for more than a decade, the school thrived and expanded with the creation of a kindergarten program.

Clark later served as an official spokesman for Cardinal Cooke.

=== St. Agnes Church, New York, New York ===
After Annunciation, in 1986 Clark became pastor of St. Agnes Parish and High School in Manhattan. It was during this time that St. Agnes became a center for Catholic study, drawing professionals from architects to medical doctors to financiers and lawyers from all over Manhattan, who not only attended Mass but also attended regular classes in philosophy and theology, especially on St. Thomas Aquinas.

In 1999 and 2000, Clark hosted a series of programs for the Catholic Eternal Word Television Network entitled Relationships, which made him better known beyond the Archdiocese of New York.

=== St. Patrick's Cathedral ===
In 2001, Cardinal Edward Egan selected Clark to be Rector of St. Patrick's Cathedral, the seat of the archdiocese. His duties as rector included running its day-to-day business, and he would preside at the main Mass on Sundays when the cardinal was unavailable.

Clark was a leading fund-raiser for Catholic causes. He was Vice President of the Homeland Foundation, an organization which supports Catholic projects, and he established the first American chapter of the Patrons of the Arts in the Vatican Museums, a preservation group. A fellow priest memorably dubbed him "the Mother Teresa to the rich".

=== Accusation and resignation ===
On August 11, 2005, Clark resigned as rector of the cathedral in response to published allegations of adultery with his longtime secretary, Laura DiFillipo. He strenuously denied the allegations for the rest of his life. DiFillipo's husband had been seeking to divorce his wife, and collected surveillance video and photographs that he made widely available to the news media.

== Death ==
Clark retired to East Hampton, New York, where he died on April 11, 2012.
