= Sean Delonas =

American political cartoonist and author

Sean Delonas is an American political cartoonist and author whose work was for 23 years published by the New York Post as part of their Page Six content. His cartoons are currently syndicated worldwide by Cagle Cartoons.

== Life and career ==
Delonas graduated from the New York Academy of Art. Delonas is author of the children's book Scuttle's Big Wish (a retelling of the story of King Midas), Sean Delonas: The Ones They Didn't Print and Some of the Ones They Did (Skyhorse Publishing (2015) ISBN 978-1632203656) and Jackie Mason & Raoul Felder's Survival Guide to New York City. His work has also appeared on the cover of another Rupert Murdoch-owned publication, The Weekly Standard. He painted the altar triptych for the Church of St. Agnes in New York.

== Controversies ==
A number of his cartoons have been criticized as "racist, offensive, and misleading." His work has been criticized as "ham-handed", and he has been accused of "churning out malevolent fantasies." He has been called "the worst cartoonist on the planet" by Vanity Fair, which also asked if he was "stupid, racist, or both?" Conversely, Commentary also praised his irreverent visual imagination, and described as "a bizarre cross between Jack Davis of Mad Magazine and Hieronymous Bosch."

A 1999 cartoon depicted Louis Farrakhan about to undergo surgery for recently diagnosed cancer, with the surgeons preparing to cut through his neck to remove "the cancerous tumor from Farrakhan's body." A 2001 cartoon showing rival editor Mortimer B. Zuckerman of the New York Daily News sending anthrax to Post editor Col Allan led to sponsor withdrawal.

After a photoshopped picture of the Sesame Street muppet Bert standing alongside Osama bin Laden went viral when it turned up on a pro-Osama placard, the website which included it (Bert is Evil) was taken down. Referencing this, in the Post, Delonas did a series of depictions of Bert instructing and training Taliban and Al Qaida terrorists.

In 2009, two days after a local chimpanzee mauling and one day after legislation was signed into law by President Barack Obama, Delonas depicted two white police officers who just shot and killed a chimpanzee. One officer says, "They'll have to find someone else to write the next stimulus bill." The cartoon was widely criticized as in bad taste and as making a reference to the racial slur of African Americans being portrayed as apes. Protests came from journalists, politicians, police groups, and the public. The Post disputed this interpretation and defended Delonas.

In 2018, the Albuquerque Journal apologized for publishing a cartoon by Delonas which equated MS-13 gang members with Dreamers. The cartoon was widely criticized, including by both U.S. senators from New Mexico.
