= St. Agnes Church (New York City) =

Church in Manhattan, New York

Coordinates: 40°45′6.57″N 73°58′28.08″W

Church of Saint Agnes
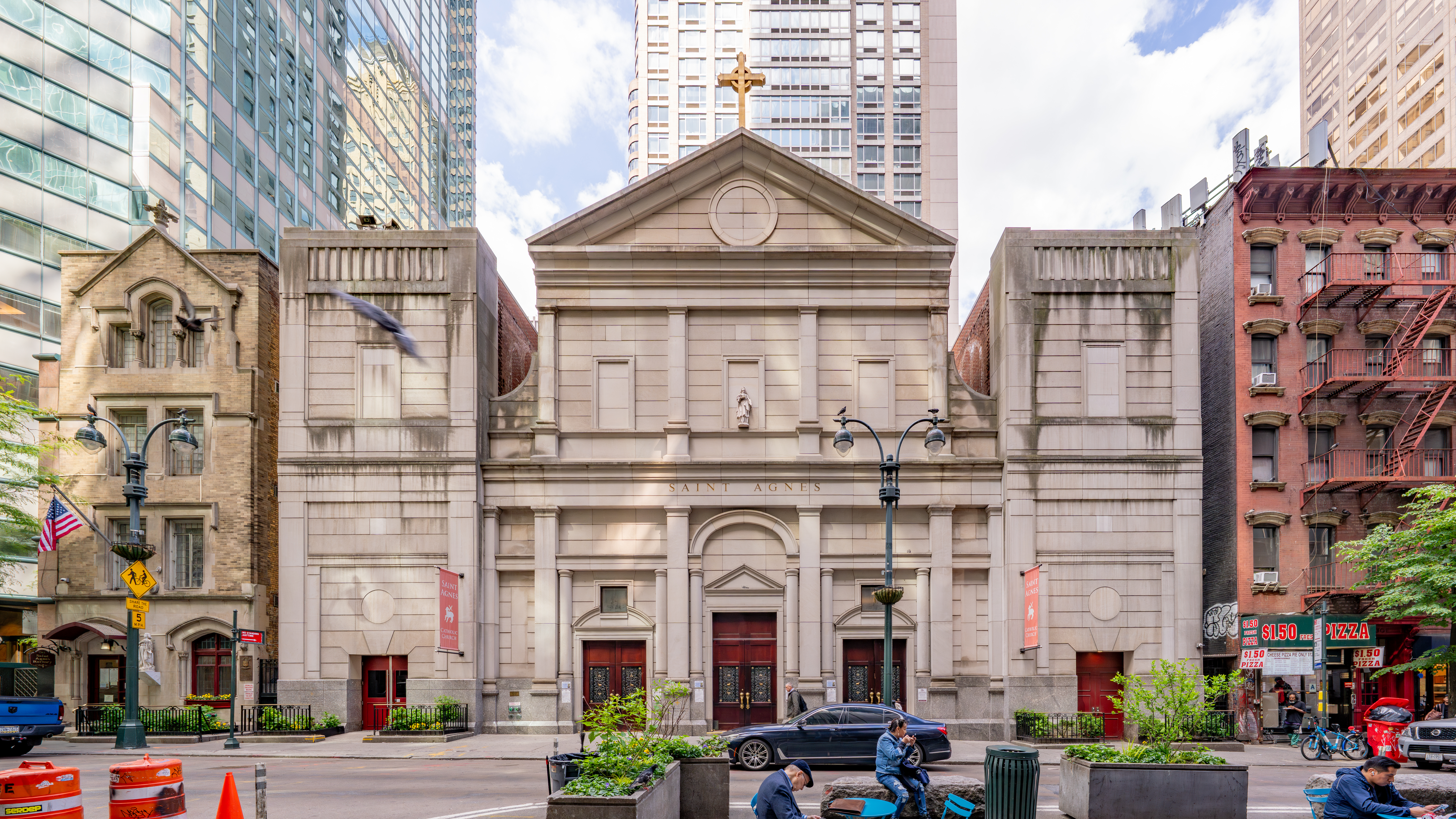

General information
- Architectural style: Gothic Revival (1877 church); Baroque Revival (1998 rebuild)
- Location: New York City, United States
- Construction started: 1873
- Completed: 1877 (church); 1904 (sacristy and rectory); 1998 (rebuild)
- Demolished: December 10, 1992 (fire)
- Cost: $31,000 (sacristy and rectory) $8,000,000 (demolition and rebuild)
- Client: Roman Catholic Archdiocese of New York

Technical details
- Structural system: Masonry

Design and construction
- Architects: Lawrence J. O'Connor (1877 church); Jeremiah O'Rourke & Sons (1904 sacristy and rectory); Acheson, Thornton, Doyle (1998 rebuild)

Website
- Church of St. Agnes, Manhattan

The Church of St. Agnes is a parish church in the Roman Catholic Archdiocese of New York at 143 East 43rd Street, Manhattan, New York City. The parish was established in 1873.

== Parish ==
The parish was intended to serve Italian laborers of the new Grand Central Depot. Rev. Harry Cummings Macdowell, nephew of Rev. Jeremiah Williams Cummings of St. Stephen's, was the first pastor, assisted by Rev. A. Catoggio. The parish was organized on July 13, 1873. Macdowell had rented a hall over Croton Market on 42nd Street as a temporary chapel and passed out handbills to announce the fact to the local Catholic residents.

A Sunday school was begun on 43rd Street. The parish school, located at 152 East 44th Street, was organized in 1893.

In 1939, St. Gabriel Church on East 37th Street was closed to make way for the Queens–Midtown Tunnel, and part of the congregation was directed to St. Agnes.

The church hosted Archbishop Fulton J. Sheen's radio and television broadcasts on behalf of the Society for the Propagation of the Faith for over half a century. The broadcasts, including the famous "Death of Stalin," were some of the most important influences in reshaping mainstream twentieth-century American attitudes on Catholicism. Other notable clergy have included Bishop John J. O'Hara, Monsignor John P. Chidwick, Monsignor Eugene V. Clark, and Father George W. Rutler. As an important venue for media, and with its proximity to the center of New York City, the church often played host to rallies, such as the starting point for John Cardinal O'Connor's anti-abortion march from this church.

== Buildings ==
The church was built during 1873–1877 to the designs of Lawrence J. O'Connor. Builders were Moran and Armstrong and Michael J. Newman. The basement was completed and used as a chapel, which was dedicated by John Cardinal McCloskey on January 11, 1874. A Celtic cross crowned the gable. The sanctuary contained a chancel window depicting St. Agnes. The completed church was dedicated by Cardinal McCloskey on May 6, 1877.

The parish constructed a four-story brick and stone rectory and sacristy in 1904 to designs by Jeremiah O'Rourke & Sons of Newark, New Jersey, for $31,000 ($1,100,000 in current dollars).

The church as it appeared in the 1900s

The church has suffered two fires. The first, which badly damaged it but left the towers standing, occurred on December 24, 1898. The following February, plans were filed to rebuild it and add a semi-octagonal chancel to the rear, at the expected total cost of $40,000 ($1,500,000 in current dollars). The second fire, on December 10, 1992, left only the outside walls and the towers standing, costing $2 million for demolition ($4.6 million current) and $6 million for the new building ($13.8 million current). The church was rebuilt to designs by the firm Acheson, Thornton, Doyle, and opened in 1998. The new church was modeled after the Church of the Gesù in Rome, but with the original towers from O'Connor's church flanking the new building.

The altar triptych in the rebuilt church was painted by Sean Delonas. St. Agnes Boys High School, located behind the church on East 44th Street, relocated to the Upper West Side until closing in 2013.
