= St. Ann Church (East Village, Manhattan) =

Former church in Manhattan, New York

Coordinates: 40.730°N 73.992°W

The Former Church of St. Ann
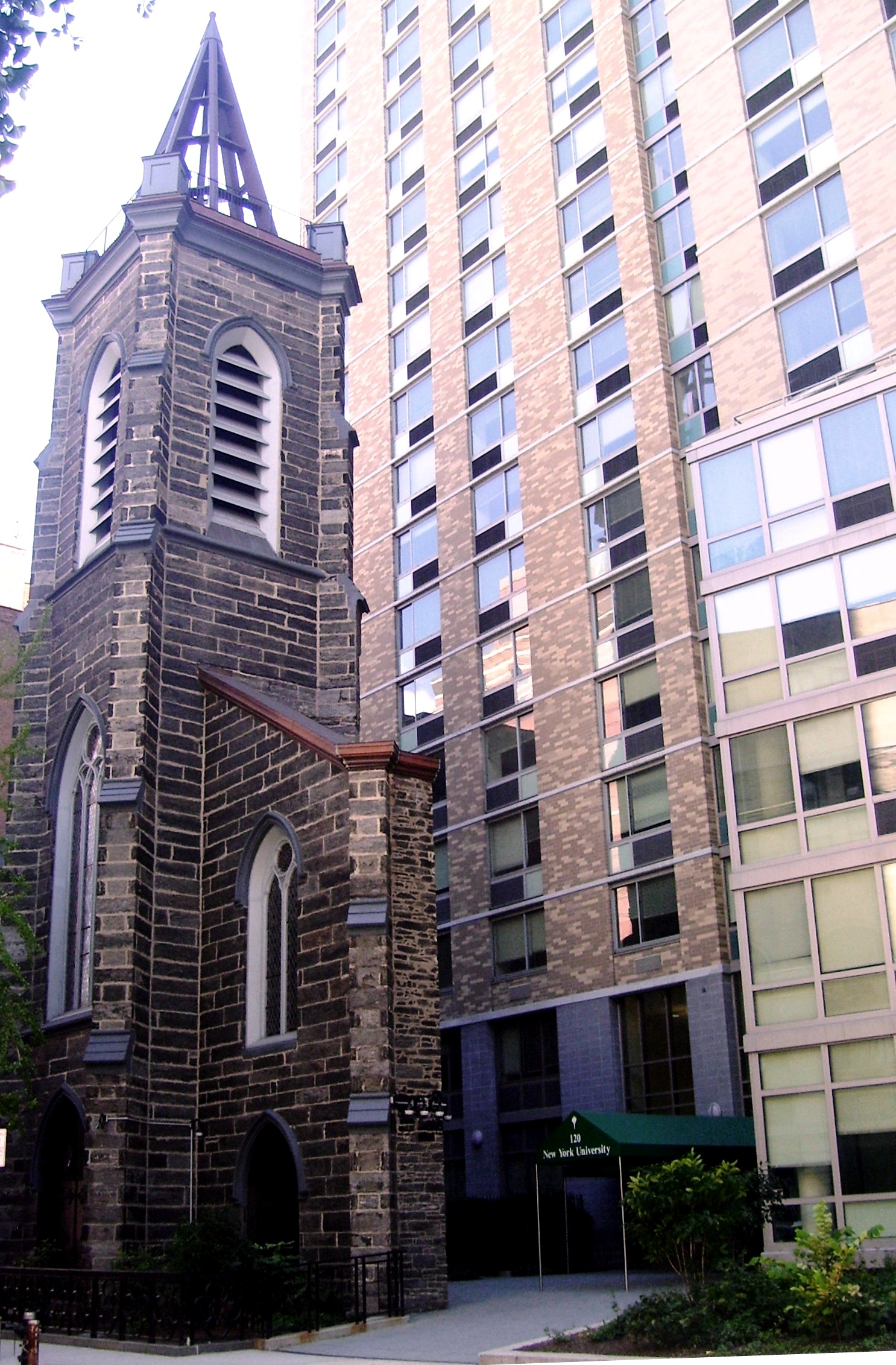
- The facade of St. Ann's stands as a folly in front of NYU's Founders Hall

General information
- Location: New York, New York, United States of America

St. Ann’s Church was a Roman Catholic parish church at 110-120 East 12th Street between Fourth and Third Avenues in the East Village neighborhood of Manhattan, New York City. It was closed in 2003 and mostly demolished, except the front facade, in 2005. The site of the church is now occupied by a dorm of New York University.

== Early parish history ==
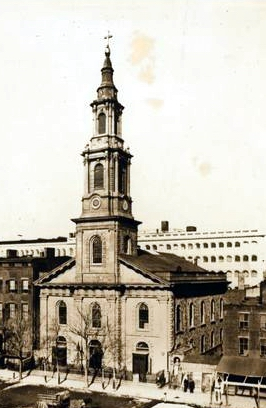
The church on 8th Street

The parish was established in 1852 by Bishop Hughes, who appointed Rev. John Murray Forbes as its first pastor. The parish began on Bond Street on the Lower East Side, but soon moved to a church building at East 8th Street at the north end of Lafayette Place, now Lafayette Street. That building had been constructed in 1811–12 on Murray Street by the Third Associate Reformed Presbyterian Church, and was designed by John McComb Jr. in the Georgian style; it was later moved by the Associate Reformed Presbyterian congregation to the 8th Street location. When that congregation moved uptown, the building was sold to the new Roman Catholic parish.

In 1870, needing more space, and wanting to establish a school, the parish bought a church building at 120 East 12th Street, and the 8th Street building was sold to the A. T. Stewart Department Store, which utilized it as an upholstery factory. In 1879 it was turned into the Aberle’s Theater, which was later called the Grand Central, John Thompson's, the Monte Cristo, the Comedy, and, in 1884, the Germania. It was torn down in 1904 due to subway construction.

The St. Ann parish's new sanctuary on 12th Street had been built in 1847 as the 12th Street Baptist Church, and from 1854 to 1867 served as the synagogue of Congregation Emanu-El, which moved there from Chrystie Street, and afterward moved to Fifth Avenue, where it remains. St. Ann's demolished everything of the 12th Street building except the facade, and Napoleon LeBrun designed a new French Gothic sanctuary, the cornerstore for which was laid on July 10, 1870. Construction of the new sanctuary, which the New York Times called "among the most beautiful" in New York City, cost $166,000. It could seat 1600 people, and was dedicated on January 1, 1871. The property extended back to 11th Street, so the parish was able to build a school. In 1920, stained glass windows were added to the church.

== Change and demise ==
At the time it was built, St. Ann's was among the wealthiest congregations in the city, but the evolving demographics of the neighborhood eventually required a change, and in 1983, the building was rededicated as the St. Ann's Shrine Armenian Catholic Cathedral, an Eastern Catholic church in communion with the Church of Rome.

Twenty years later, in 2003, the Archdiocese of New York announced that the church would be permanently closed, despite objections by parishioners and preservationists, who petitioned the New York City Landmarks Preservation Commission for landmark status, to no avail. A developer bought the building in 2005, and plans were announced for a new dormitory for New York University to be built on the site. Protests by the Greenwich Village Society for Historic Preservation provoked NYU into promising that the concerns of the community would be taken into account in the dorm's design, but the final result was that the church was demolished, except for the facade which remains as a free-standing structure in front of the Founders Hall dormitory designed by the firm of Perkins Eastman. The AIA Guide to New York City describes the result as a futile exercise: "no connection is made, or even attempted, between the old church and the 26-story hulk ... the effect is of a majestic elk, shot and stuffed."

== Pastors ==
- Rev. William A. O'Neill, rector from 1895 (founding pastor of the Guardian Angel parish, where he served from 1888 to 1895)
- Father John Verona, between the seventies and the early eighties.
