= Village AIDS Memorial =

LGBT memorial in New York City

The Village AIDS Memorial, formally known as the Greenwich Village AIDS Memorial, is a series of 580 engraved plaques located in the choir loft of St. Veronica's Church. Each plaque commemorates the life of a New York resident who died of AIDS. Dedicated in 1992, it is one of the first public memorials to recognize the impact of the AIDS epidemic in New York City. The church's rectory was the location of one of the first AIDS hospice centers in Manhattan when it opened in 1985 but the memorial faced a rocky start due to the church's uncertain relationship with the LGBTQ+ community in the city.

When the church's closure was announced in 2017, the future of the memorial was unknown. In 2022 it was moved to St. Francis Xavier church in Chelsea.
