= Napoleon LeBrun =

American architect (1821-1901)

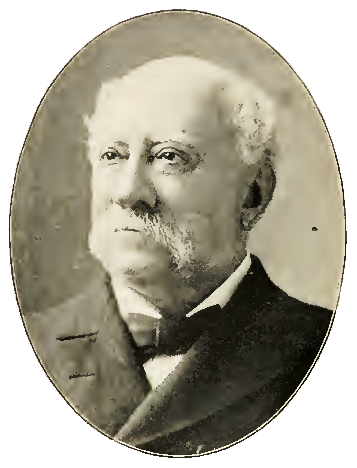
- (c.1899)
- Born: Napoleon Eugene Charles Henry LeBrun; January 2, 1821; Philadelphia Pennsylvania, U.S.
- Died: July 9, 1901 (aged 80); New York City, U.S.
- Resting place: Laurel Hill Cemetery, Philadelphia, Pennsylvania, U.S.
- Known for: architect

Napoleon Eugene Charles Henry LeBrun (January 2, 1821 – July 9, 1901) was an American architect. He began his career in Philadelphia designing churches and theatres including St. Augustine's Church, the Cathedral-Basilica of Sts. Peter and Paul and the Philadelphia Academy of Music. He moved to New York City, established the firm Napoleon LeBrun & Sons and designed multiple additional churches. He became the official architect of the Fire Department of New York and designed 42 firehouses between 1879 and 1895. He also designed early skyscrapers in New York City such as the Metropolitan Life Insurance Company Tower and the Home Life Building.

== Biography ==
=== In Philadelphia ===
LeBrun was born on January 2, 1821, in Philadelphia to Charles and Adelaide (Madelaine) LeBrun. Both parents were well-educated Catholics born in France. His father supported the family by working as an author, teacher and translator. LeBrun's early architectural training began at the age of 15 when he worked in the offices of Thomas Ustick Walter. In 1847, LeBrun designed the St. Augustine Church in Philadelphia. After six years with Walter, LeBrun left to set up his own office in 1841, eventually receiving as his major commissions the Cathedral-Basilica of Sts. Peter and Paul (1846–1864) and the Academy of Music (1857).

As a young man in his twenties, LeBrun found opportunity in the booming industrial development of the Schuylkill Valley of Pennsylvania in the 1840s. His other early work includes the original version of Trinity Episcopal Church, Pottsville (1847), still standing though much altered by later revisions. His design for the church led to the commission for the Schuylkill County Prison (1851) when the county seat moved from Orwigsburg to Pottsville. He also designed the first Columbia County Courthouse in Bloomsburg and the 1854 Montgomery County Courthouse in Norristown. Although both were later extensively redesigned and expanded, the notable marble facade of the Montgomery County Courthouse remains his outward and identifying creation.

In Philadelphia, LeBrun was known for his many churches, including not only St. Augustine's and the Cathedral-Basilica of Sts. Peter and Paul, but also St. Patrick's Catholic Church (1841) on 20th Street and the Episcopal Church of the Epiphany (1848) on 17th Street, now St. John Chrysostom Albanian Orthodox Church.

=== In New York City ===
In 1864, LeBrun relocated his office and family to New York City, establishing his reputation there with the Masonic Temple (1870-1875) on West 23rd Street in Manhattan, designed in the Second Empire style; in 1911 the Temple was torn down to be replaced with the current Masonic Building designed by Harry P. Knowles. In 1870, LeBrun's son, Pierre, joined the firm, which became "Napoleon LeBrun & Son" in 1880, and in 1892 "Napoleon LeBrun & Sons" after his younger son Michel also joined.

As in Philadelphia, LeBrun and his firm, often with Pierre as the lead architect, designed numerous churches in New York City, including the Roman Catholic Church of St. John the Baptist (1872) on West 31st Street and the Episcopal Church of St. Mary the Virgin (1894–1895) on West 46th Street in the Theater District neighborhood. St Mary's was the first church in the world to be designed with a concealed steel skeleton, for this reason it was known in its early days as the "Chicago Church", after the Chicago school of architecture, which was largely responsible for the use of steel skeletons in skyscraper construction.

Other ecclesiastical commissions included the Seventh Presbyterian Church (1842, demolished), the Scots (or Second) Presbyterian Church (1843, no longer extant), the Church of St. Peter the Apostle (German Catholic) on 5th Street (1843, no longer extant), the Protestant Episcopal Church of the Holy Nativity in Philadelphia (1844, demolished 2013), the Lombard-style Church of the Epiphany (1869–1870, burned down), and St. Ann's Roman Catholic Church on East 12th Street, for which LeBrun designed a French Gothic sanctuary in 1871 which sat behind the original 1847 facade; in 2006 everything but that facade was demolished - it now stands freely in front of a college dormitory built on the site of the sanctuary. His office is also responsible for the current St. Michael's Church (34th Street, Manhattan) church, rectory, convent, and school (1904–1907), which incorporate elements of an earlier church by Lawrence J. O'Connor which was demolished for the construction of the North River Tunnels and Pennsylvania Station.

In 1879, LeBrun served as the American Institute of Architects representative on the Board of Examiners of the Building Bureau of the Fire Department. He became the official architect of the Fire Department of New York and between 1879 and 1895, his firm designed 42 buildings, including fire houses, a fire pier and a warehouse. He also designed some of the earliest skyscrapers, including the Metropolitan Life Insurance Company Tower and the Home Life Building.

=== Death ===
LeBrun died in 1901 in New York City, and was buried in Laurel Hill Cemetery in Philadelphia.

== Gallery ==
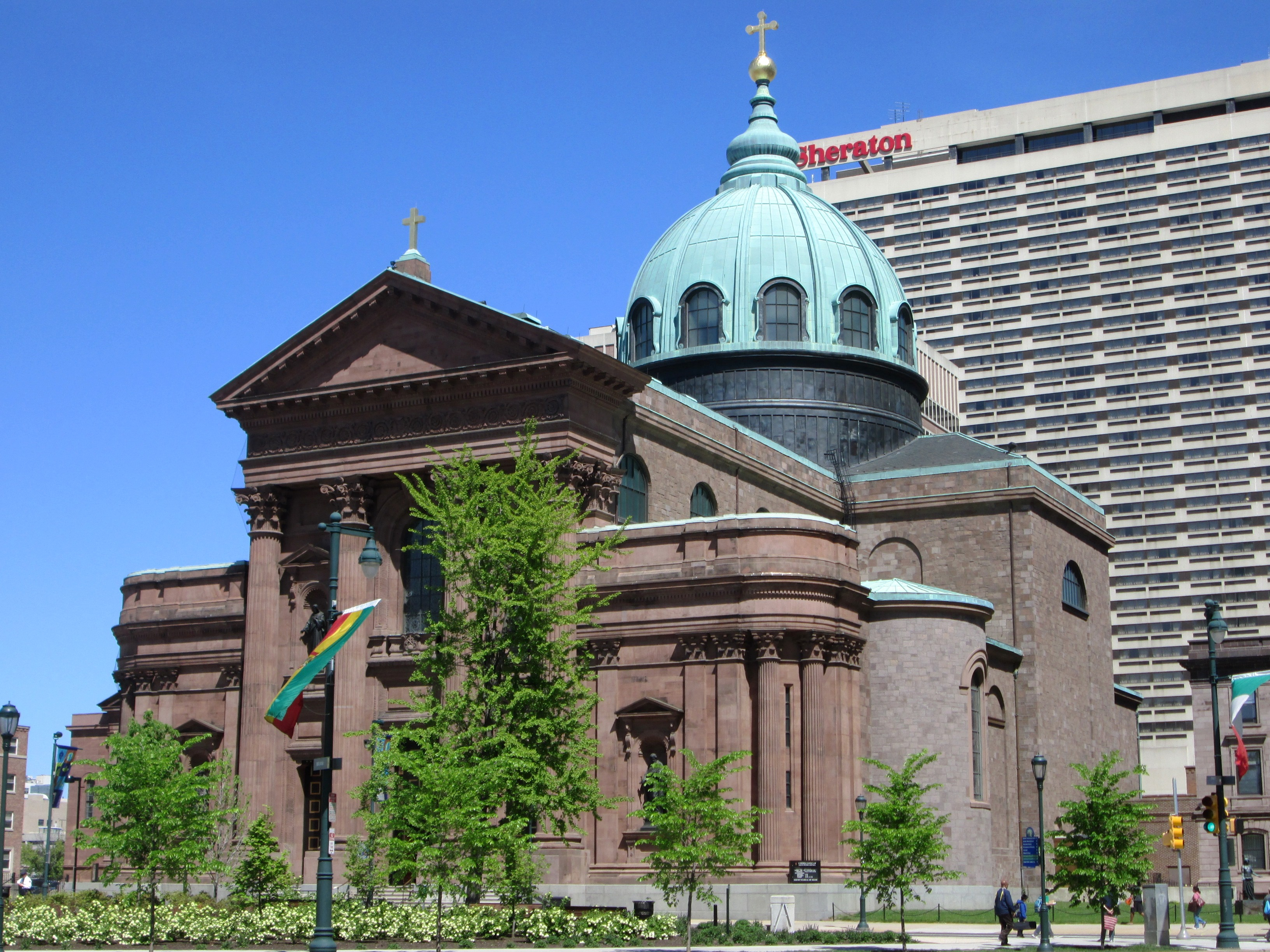
Cathedral-Basilica of Sts. Peter and Paul (1846–1864) in Philadelphia

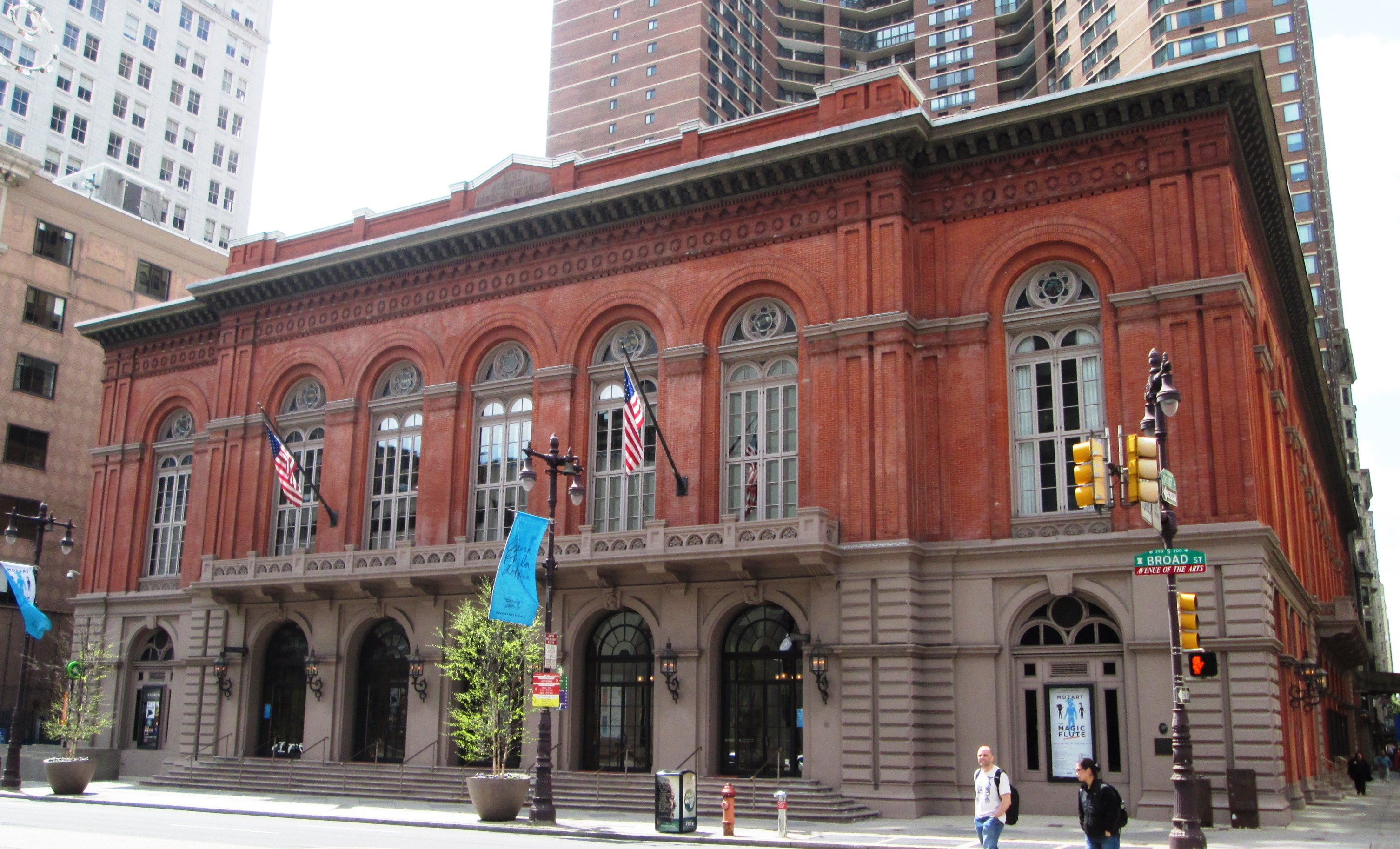
The Academy of Music in Philadelphia (1857)

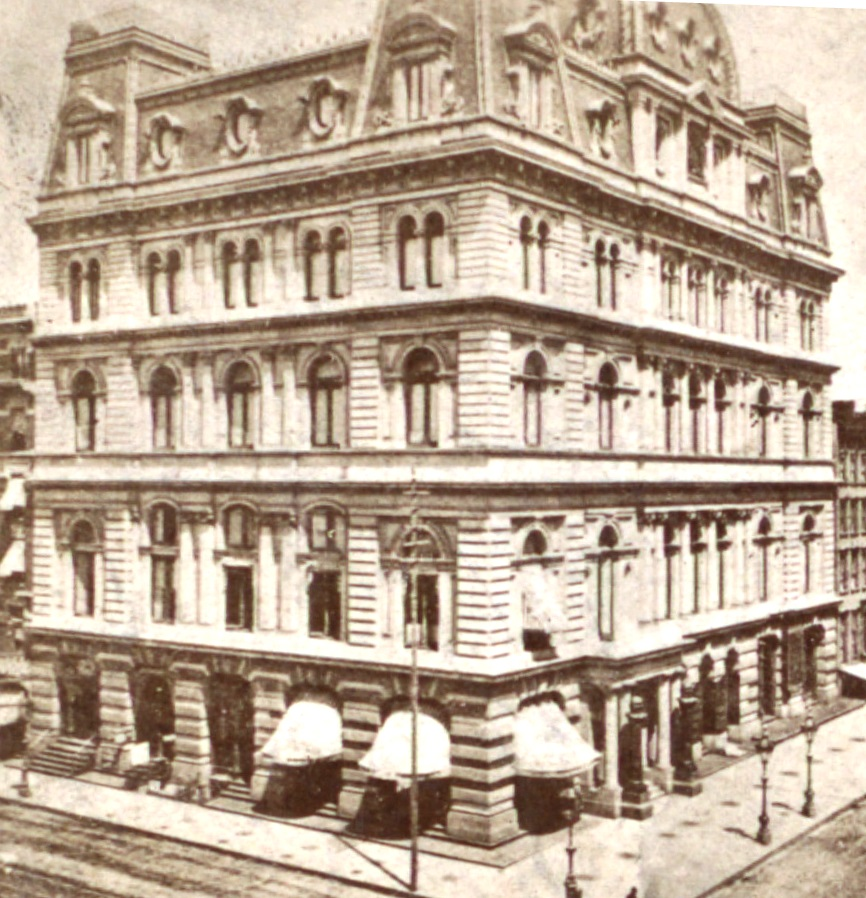
The now-demolished Masonic Temple in Manhattan (1875) which helped established LeBrun's reputation in New York City

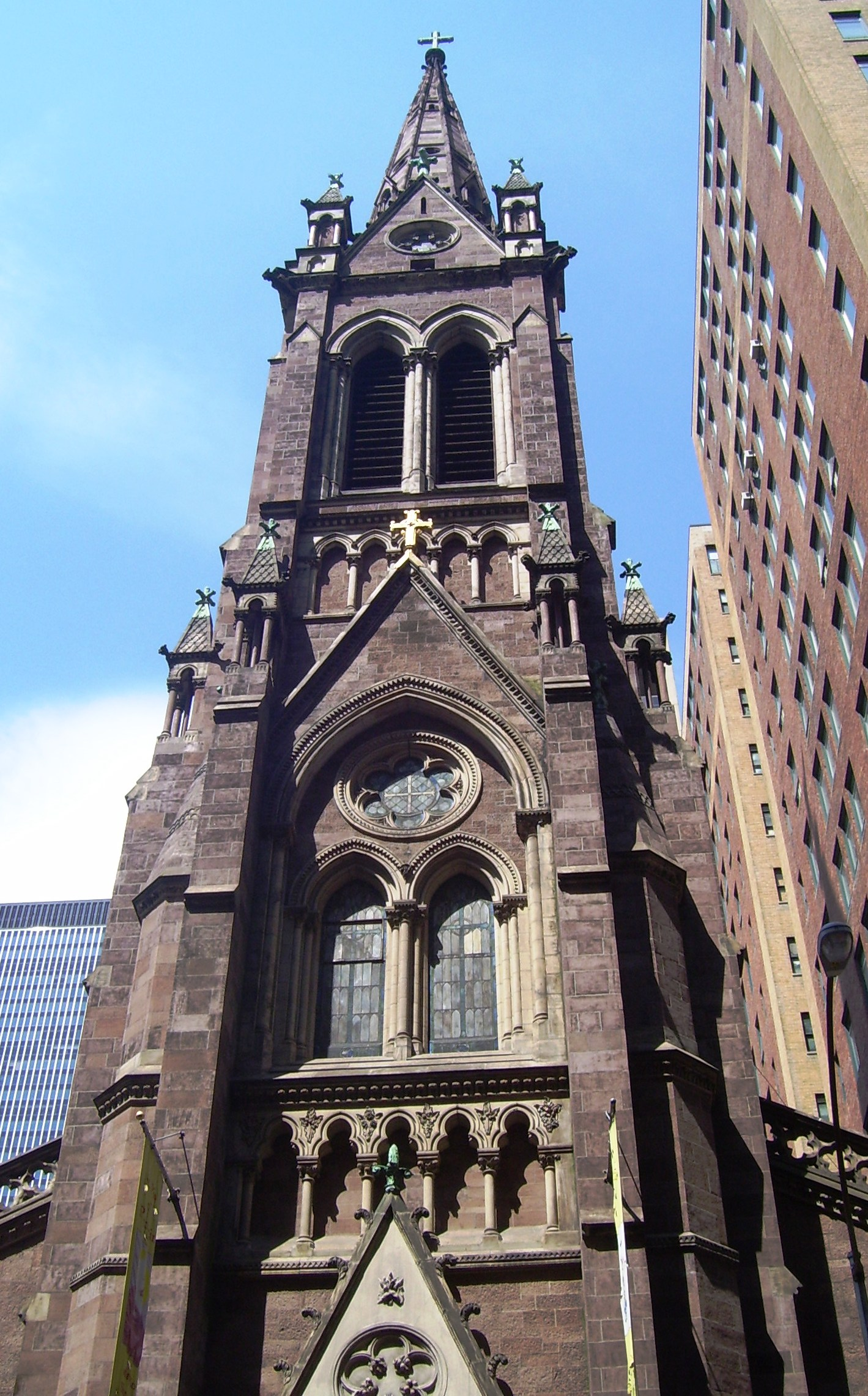
The steeple of the Church of St. John the Baptist (1872) in Manhattan, New York City

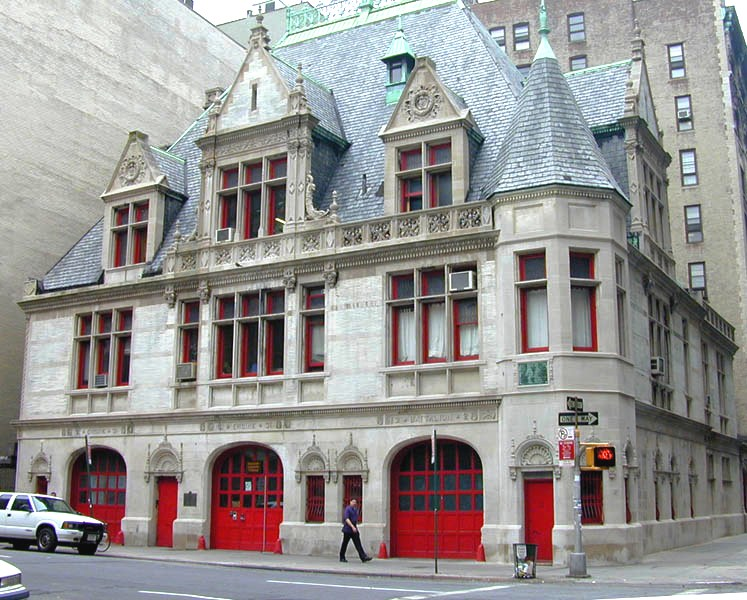
Firehouse, Engine Company 31
