= Holy Cross Church (Manhattan) =

Catholic Church in New York City, US

Coordinates: 40°45′29″N 73°59′28″W

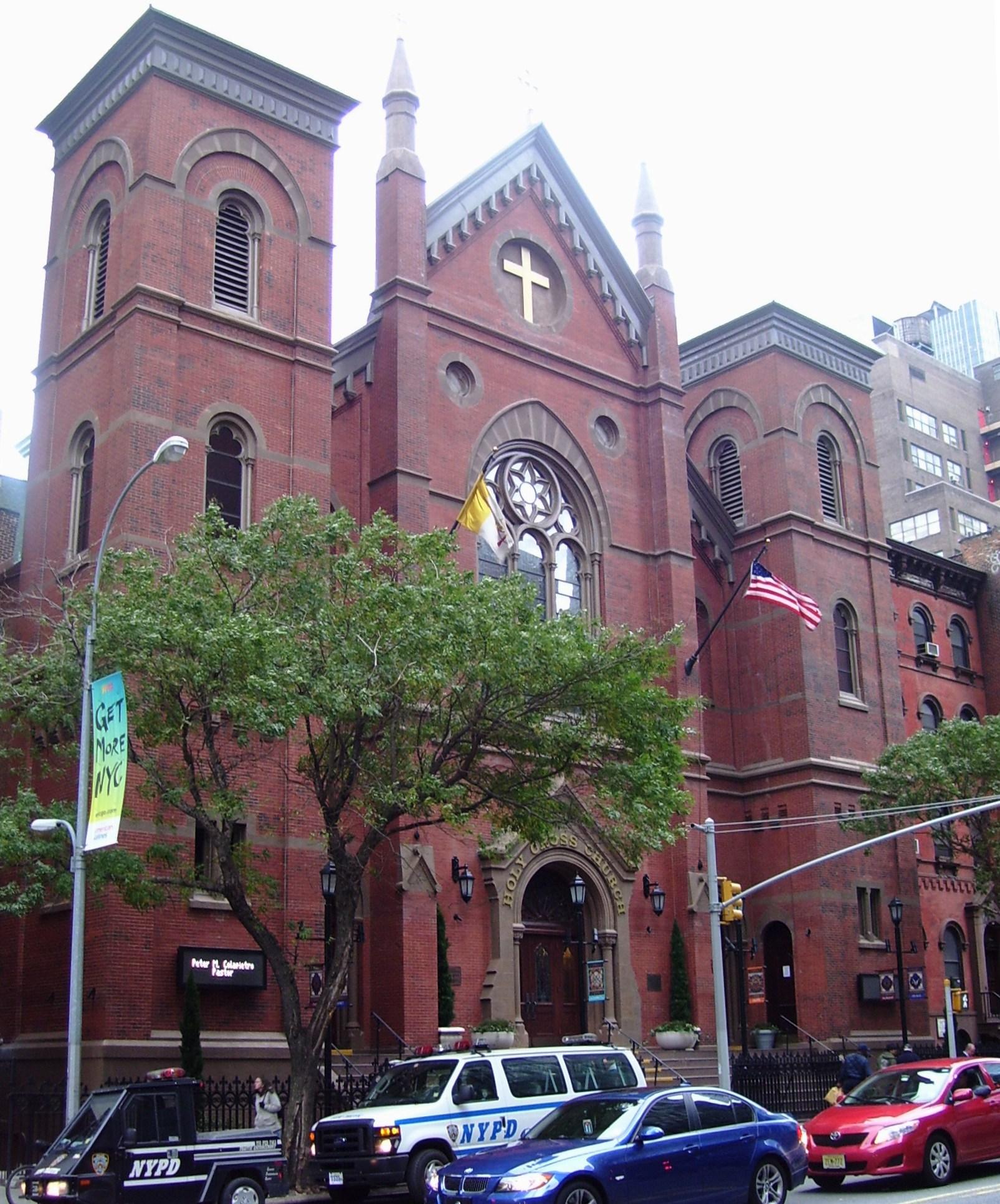
- Holy Cross Church
- Location: New York City
- Country: US
- Denomination: Catholic
- Sui iuris church: Latin Church
- Tradition: Roman Rite

History
- Founded: 1852

Architecture
- Architect: Henry Engelbert
- Style: Italianate Gothic
- Completed: 1870

Specifications
- Length: 100 feet (30 m)
- Width: 82 feet (25 m)
- Height: 148 feet (45 m)
- Materials: Red brick

Administration
- Archdiocese: New York
- Parish: Holy Cross–St. John the Baptist

Clergy
- Pastor: Michael Ramos

Holy Cross Church is a Catholic parish church located at 329 West 42nd Street between Eighth and Ninth Avenues in the Hell's Kitchen neighborhood of Manhattan, New York City, near Times Square and across the street from the Port Authority Bus Terminal. The church is one of two churches in the Holy Cross-St. John the Baptist parish (the other church being St. John the Baptist).

== History ==
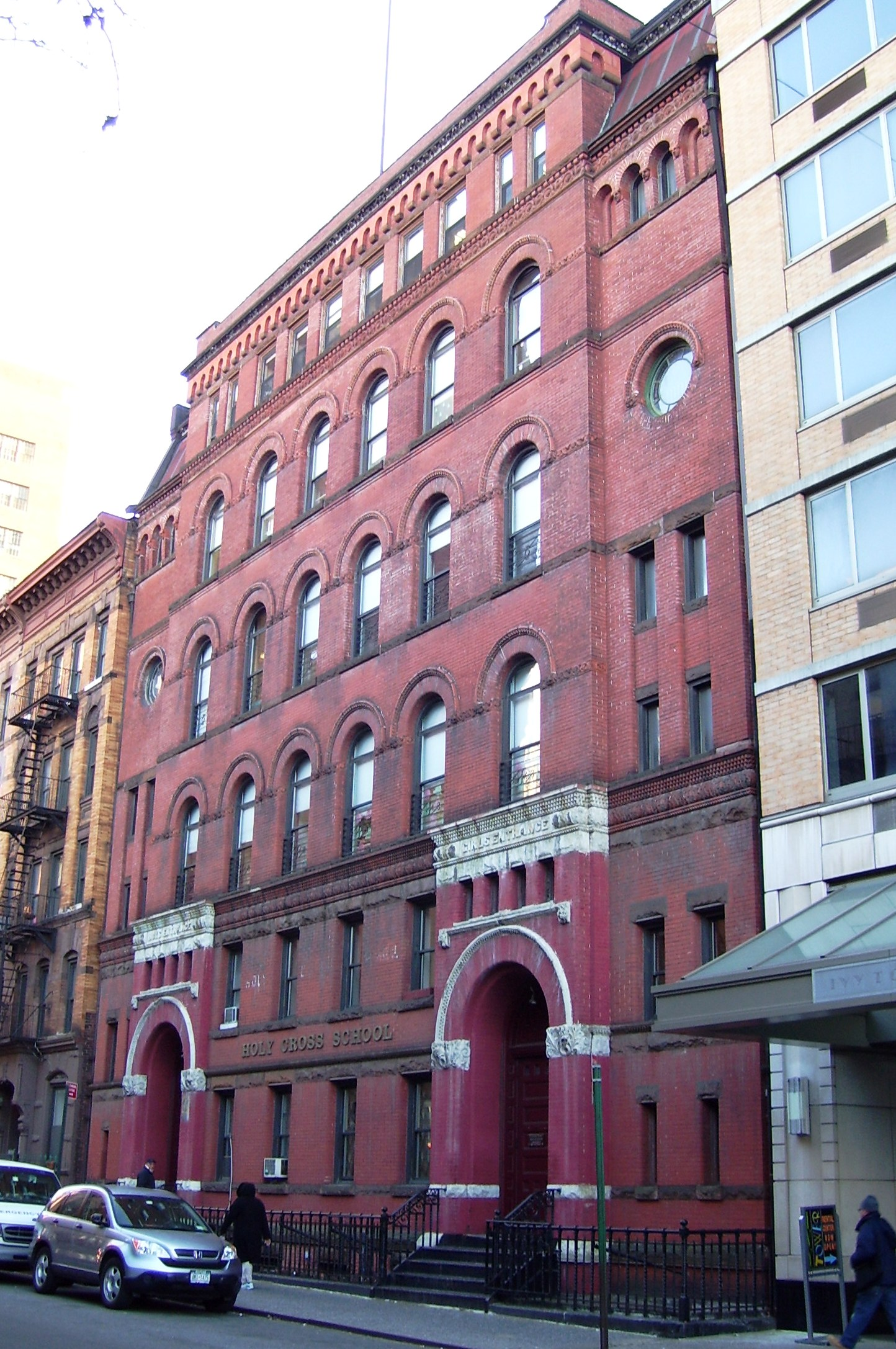
Former Holy Cross School, now De La Salle Academy at 332 West 43rd Street.

The Holy Cross Parish was established in 1852 and a chapel erected, which the congregation quickly outgrew. In 1854, a new building was constructed and dedicated, but lightning struck this second structure in 1867, and the ensuing fire severely damaged it. The current church was constructed to a design by Henry Engelbert on the site of the damaged building and completed in 1870. It is notable as the oldest building on 42nd Street. The Holy Cross School building (now known as De La Salle Academy), located behind the church at 332 West 43rd Street, was built in 1887 to a design by Lawrence J. O'Connor.

Since 1900, Holy Cross Church has worked with politicians, police and community groups to combat poverty, crime and drugs in the neighborhood. The parish is especially associated with the popular ministry of the Reverend Francis P. Duffy.

In 2015, the parish of Holy Cross merged with the parish of St. John the Baptist, on West 30th Street. The Archdiocese of New York also confirmed the merger in a press release in May 2015. The press release notes that the two parishes had been collaborating for several years prior to the merger and that the newly formed Holy Cross-St. John the Baptist Parish would continue to serve the spiritual needs of the local community. Holy Cross Church has been staffed by priests of the Order of Friars Minor Capuchin since the 2015 merger.

== Architecture ==
The exterior of Holy Cross Church shows a red brick facade with flanking twin towers in an Italianate Gothic form. Inside, the church reveals an eclectic mixture of Georgian classical, Romanesque and Byzantine forms. The main dimensions are 100 feet from front to back and 82 feet from side to side, where the configuration completes the suggestion of a cross. A dome, surmounted by a cross, rises above the intersection of nave and transept. From curb level to the top of the cross is a distance of 148 feet.

The nine stained-glass windows in the chancel were made by Mayer & Company of Munich. Louis Comfort Tiffany designed the mosaics below the dome and in the sanctuary. Tiffany also designed the stained glass of the clerestory windows and wheel windows of the transepts.

The red brick and terra-cotta school building facade was designed in the Romanesque Revival style.

== Services ==
Mass is celebrated in both English- and Spanish-language services. Holy Cross Church operates Crossroads Food Pantry [CFP] and Harvesters Soup Kitchen [HSK] (alternate Saturdays) serving the poor and hungry (Except the month of June and December, no services from HSK). Hospitality is offered directly after the 11:30am Mass on Sundays. It also conducts an evangelical program named LAMP Missionary for the assistance of local residents and passers-by who wish to receive religious counseling.

== Music ==
Choral music and congregational singing are present in both Spanish- and English-language services. Music is led from either a grand piano located near the altar or from an organ in the gallery. The church houses an Aeolian-Skinner organ, which is located in the rear gallery in the choir loft. Installed in 1933 and completed in 1941 with the addition of a set of chimes, it replaced an organ built in 1882 by J.H. & C.S. Odell. The earliest organ, with one manual and two octaves, which had been built by Hall and Labagh in 1854, was destroyed in the fire of 1867.

== Father Duffy ==
Holy Cross Church is sometimes known informally as "Father Duffy's Church", after the Reverend Francis P. Duffy. Duffy served as Chaplain of the "Fighting Irish" 69th New York Regiment during World War I, and was decorated for his activities. After the war, in 1921, Duffy was appointed Rector of Holy Cross. Later elevated to Pastor, Father Duffy served the church until his death in 1932. That year he instituted the Printers' Mass on Sunday mornings at 2:30 A.M. for workers at the New York Times, Herald Tribune, Daily News and Daily Mirror whose shifts required late hours. Father Duffy is commemorated by a bronze statue located on West 46th Street between Seventh Avenue and Broadway, at Times Square's northern end, which is officially named Duffy Square.
