= St. Columba Church (New York City) =

Coordinates: 40.747485°N 73.999124°W

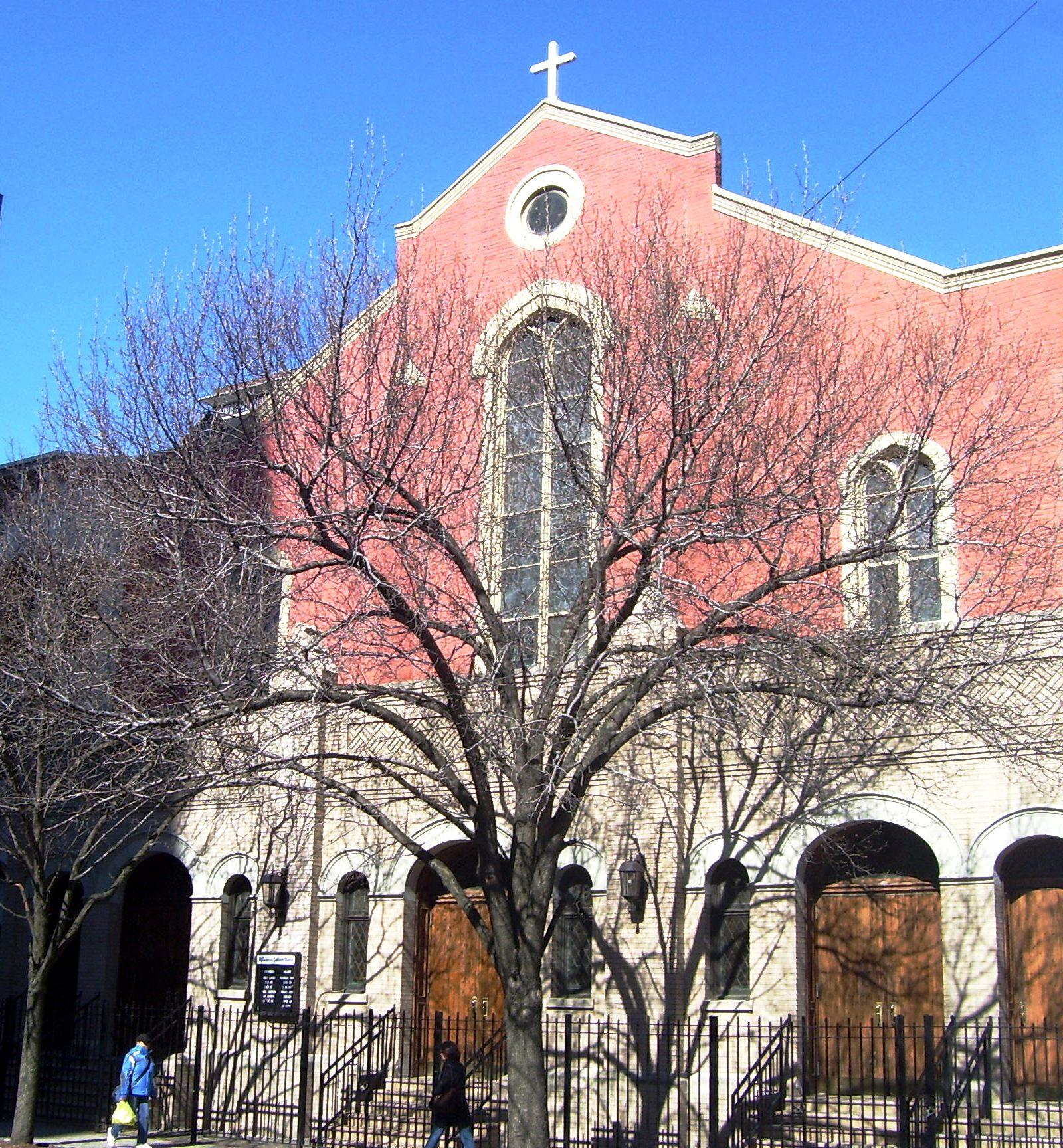
- St. Columba Church, 343 W 25th St
- Interactive map of the St. Columba Church area

General information
- Location: New York City, United States of America
- Client: Roman Catholic Archdiocese of New York

Website
- St. Columba Church, Manhattan (Chelsea)

The Church of St. Columba is a Roman Catholic parish church in the Roman Catholic Archdiocese of New York, located at 343 W 25th St, Manhattan (Chelsea), New York City. The parish was established in 1845.

== History ==
St. Columba's Church was built at the request of Catholic residents of the neighborhood of Chelsea, whose closest church was of St. Joseph in Greenwich Village. Bishop Hughes put Rev. Patrick Joseph Bourke in charge. Father Bourke first held services in a small frame building on the south side of 27th St. between 8th and 9th Avenues. He then obtained possession of a boathouse at 24th and 8th. The cornerstone of the church was laid by Bishop Hughes on May 22, 1845. The church was constructed by parishioners who employed as laborers on the west side docks, who would spend evenings at the site after loading and unloading ships all day. St. Columba's was dedicated on October 2, 1845 by coadjutor bishop John McCloskey.

Father Bourke, who occasionally preached in Irish, resigned due to poor health and returned to Europe; he was succeeded by Rev. Michael McAleer. The parish was seriously affected during the cholera season of 1849. McAleer, a former missionary in Tennessee, slept on a couch in the parlor, with a horse and wagon at the ready, should his services be needed.

Upon the death of Father Prat in December 1908, Rev. Thomas A. Thornton was appointed pastor. Thornton was also Superintendent of the New York Catholic Schools.

Three parish priests served in the Chaplain Corps during World War II. In 2015 the parish of St. Columba merged with that of Guardian Angel.

St. Columba had closed by 2023, after the building was found to be in danger of collapsing. The church, school, and convent were sold, and demolished in 2026.

=== Pastors ===
- Rev. Patrick Joseph Bourke, 1845-1846
- Rev. Michael McAleer, 1846-1881
- Rev. Henry Prat, 1881-1908
- Rev. Thomas A. Thornton, 1908-

== Building ==
Three oil paintings show the life of Saint Columba. Stained glass windows depict, Columba, Saint Patrick and Saint Brigid.

== School ==
Fr. McAleer started the parish school in 1848. The frame building was replaced by brick in 1856. The boys department was under the Brothers of the Christian Schools; the girls were taught by the Sisters of Charity. In 1866, the sisters also opened for young ladies, the Academy of St. Angela on 22nd St. The third school building was dedicated in 1909, with a cornerstone that read, "For God and Country". St. Columba elementary school closed in June 2006. Edward Byrne Breitenberger, Michael Anthony Orlando Cassavitis, and Caryn Elaine Johnson are alumni of St. Columba's.
