= St. Veronica Church (Manhattan) =

Catholic parish church in New York City

Coordinates: 40°43′59″N 74°00′29″W

Church of St. Veronica
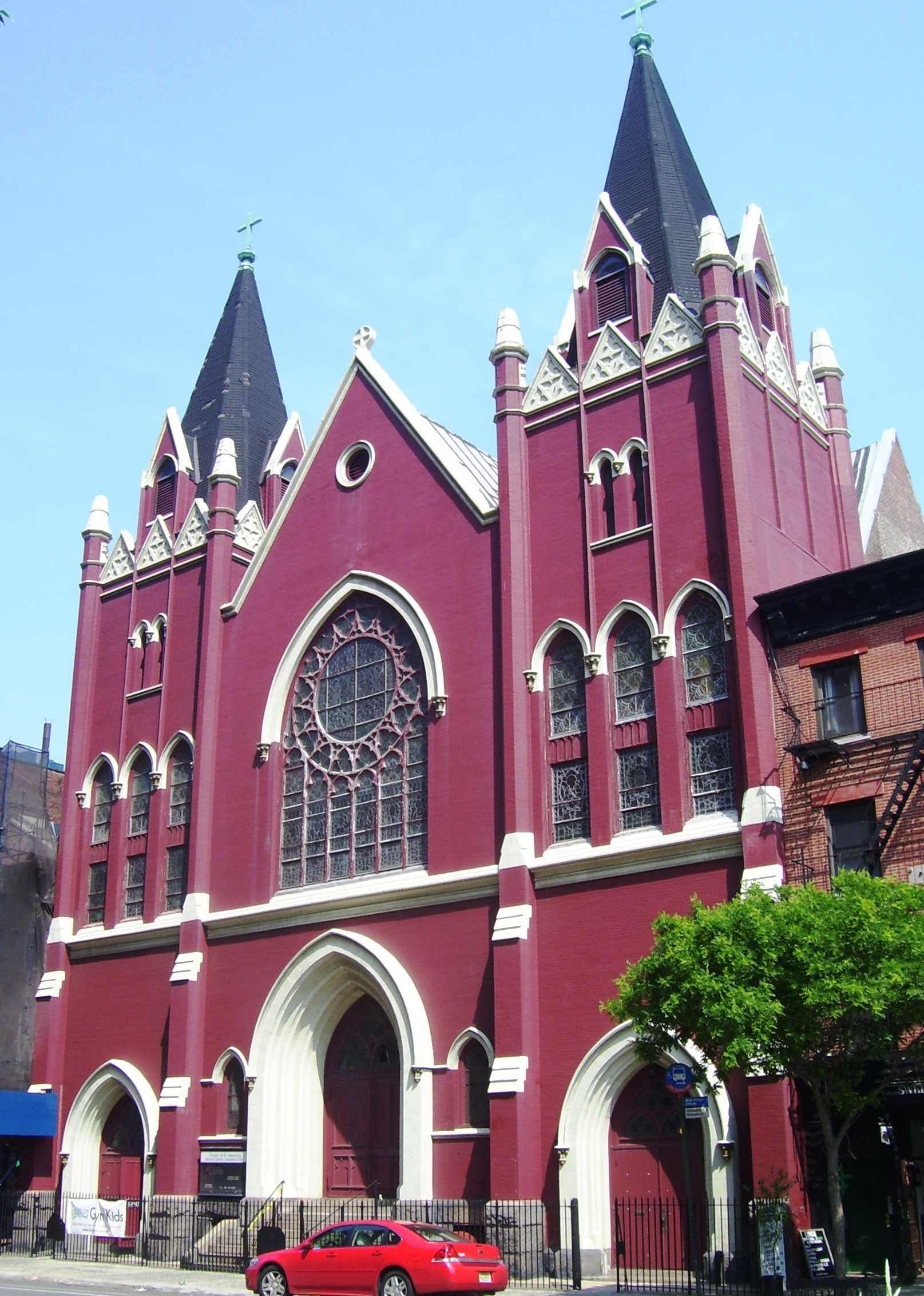
- (2011)
- Interactive map of the Church of St. Veronica area

General information
- Architectural style: Church: Victorian Gothic Revival; Rectory: Romanesque Revival
- Location: Manhattan, New York City, United States
- Construction started: Church: 1890; Rectory: 1893; School: 1905
- Completed: Church: 1903; Rectory: 1894; School: 1905
- Cost: Church: $55,000; School: $90,000
- Client: Roman Catholic Archdiocese of New York

Technical details
- Structural system: Brick masonry

Design and construction
- Architects: Church: John J. Deery; School (1905): William K. Benedict

The Church of St. Veronica was a Roman Catholic parish church in the Roman Catholic Archdiocese of New York, located at 153 Christopher Street between Greenwich and Washington Streets in the West Village area of the Greenwich Village neighborhood of Manhattan, New York City. The parish was established in 1887, and the church was built between 1890 and 1903. It is located within the New York City Landmarks Preservation Commission's Greenwich Village Historic District Extension I, which was designated in 2006.

== History ==
The parish was founded in 1887 to accommodate the increased number of Catholics in the area, which had caused the Church of St. Joseph in Greenwich Village to become overcrowded; it was one of 99 new parishes created by Archbishop Michael A. Corrigan between 1887 and 1902. The parish's first Mass was celebrated in a former stable on Washington Street, near Barrow Street The first pastor was the Rev. John Fitzharris, who had previously been the first assistant pastor at St. Joseph's. He was succeeded after his death in 1893 by the Rev. Daniel McCormick. The Rev. Joseph F. Flannelly succeeded McCormick after the latter's death in 1904. In 1914, the parish had a Catholic population of around 6,500.

== Buildings ==
The site for the present church was purchased in 1888 for $69,500, but the cornerstone was not laid until March 1890. The basement was completed by that October and was used for services until the parish could raise sufficient funds to start up construction again in 1902; the church, which was designed by John J. Deery in Victorian Gothic Revival style, was completed in 1903. The Rev. Daniel McCormick, rector from 1893 to 1904, built a rectory from 1893 to 1894, and acquired the old St. Joseph's School at 112-116 Leroy Street in 1897.

Upon the church's completion, the Rev. Joseph F. Flannelly built a new school at the southwest corner of Barrow and Washington Streets in 1905. The four-story over basement brick and stone parochial school was built to designs by William K. Benedict at a cost of $90,000. In 1914, the school was run by the Christian Brothers, the Sisters of Charity, and 21 lay teachers, and had 1,400 pupils.

On Sunday, June 25, 2017, the historic St. Veronica's Catholic church on Christopher Street hosted its last official services. Parishioners were expected to attend Our Lady of Guadalupe at St. Bernard's on West 14th Street between Eighth and Ninth Avenues.

A group of St. Veronica's parishioners rallied to have the church reopened, taking the cause all the way to the Vatican. On July 2, 2020, the Decree of Closure was rescinded by Timothy Cardinal Dolan, after it appeared that the Vatican's verdict might support the parishioners' case.

== See also ==
- Village AIDS Memorial
