= H.J.M. de Kok =

Dutch surgeon (born 1931)

Henk de Kok was a Dutch surgeon born in 1931. While working at the Beatrix Hospital in Gorinchem, the Netherlands, he pioneered surgical laparoscopy and was the first worldwide to perform an appendectomy assisted by laparoscopy in 1975. Henk died 25 December 2020.

Henk de Kok was the second youngest of a large family in the Netherlands and the 4th doctor among his siblings. His older brother, dr J.J.M de Kok (1919-1994) was both a surgeon and a gynecologist at the Amphia Hospital in Oosterhout. He had learnt the use of the laparoscopic procedure in Paris from the groundbreaking gynecologist Professor Raoul Palmer (1904-1985). As a medical doctor in training, Henk regularly came to visit his older brother during his residency and was allowed to assist in operations. Henk became fascinated by the potential use of the procedure for other purposes besides gynecology. Settling in as surgeon in 1971 at the Beatrix hospital in Gorinchem, he initially started using the laparoscopy to inspect patients with unexplained abdominal complaints and/or take biopsies. However, following four years of research, he performed his first laparoscopic appendectomy in 1975. During the next two years, dr de Kok developed a new surgical method that was a minimally invasive procedure, leading to considerable less scarring, performing his procedure successfully on 30 patients. While the procedure was new, Dr de Kok's largest research work evolved around the question of when an appendix should be removed. Following classic theory, the appendix would only be removed when it was about to be ruptured or had ruptured. Dr de Kok's theory was that the appendix was often the cause of patients with severe bouts of abdominal pain, even if the appendix had not yet ruptured and could be taken out proactively. His first publication describing his theory around the appendix as well as the use of the laparoscopy during surgery was published in a Dutch academic journal in 1977 appendectomy. Another well known doctor, the gynecologist Dr Kurt Semm (1927-2003), also performed an early laparoscopic appendix and published his findings in 1980. Both men met strong resistance, which only ended with the introduction of the laparoscopic cholecystectomy in France and Germany. During the rest of his medical career, dr de Kok continued to research his theory, publish articles - including in the controversial and non-peer reviewed Medical Hypotheses - and speak at conferences, most notably the International Laparoscopy Congress in Miami, USA, (Feb. 1981) to popularise the use of laparoscopy in surgical practice. He has been widely quoted by colleagues.
