= David Horrobin =

British-Canadian entrepreneur, medical researcher, author and editor (1939 – 2003)

David Frederick Horrobin (6 October 1939 – 1 April 2003) was a British-Canadian entrepreneur, medical researcher, author and editor. He is best known as the founder of the biotechnology company Scotia Holdings and as a promoter of evening primrose oil as a medical treatment, Horrobin was founder and editor of the journals Medical Hypotheses and Prostaglandins, Leukotrienes and Essential Fatty Acids, the latter journal (initially titled Prostaglandins and Medicine) co-founded with his then graduate student Morris Karmazyn.

Horrobin believed that many diseases involve a lack of fatty acid precursors and might be alleviated by supplementing with the appropriate fatty acid. Horrobin's efforts focused on evening primrose oil, which contains gamma-linolenic acid. In the 1980s, Horrobin sold primrose oil in the United States without legally demonstrating its safety and efficacy, leading to government confiscations and felony indictments of his associates. Horrobin was later accused of withholding research data and suppressing the reports of scientists who questioned his claims. During Horrobin's tenure as chief executive, Scotia Pharmaceuticals obtained licences for several drugs based on evening primrose oil, but these licenses were withdrawn for lack of efficacy. Amidst charges of mismanagement and research fraud, Horrobin was ousted as CEO by a unanimous vote of the board and left the company in 1998. In 2001, Scotia, one of the first publicly traded biotechnology companies in the United Kingdom, also became the first to collapse. After Horrobin's departure from Scotia, he founded Laxdale Ltd., a company that investigated omega-3 fatty acids as possible treatments for schizophrenia and neurodegenerative diseases.

Horrobin died of pneumonia as a complication of mantle cell lymphoma in 2003. Obituaries noted his contributions to the biotechnology industry, intellectual acumen, original thinking and adventurousness, while some criticised his promotion of primrose oil and other questionable claims. Notably controversial obituaries in The Independent and the British Medical Journal angered Horrobin's friends and family by also portraying negative aspects of Horrobin's life, with the BMJ obituary stating that Horrobin "may prove to be the greatest snake oil salesman of his age".

== Education and academic career ==
Born in Bolton, England, Horrobin attended Queen Elizabeth's Grammar School, Blackburn, and King's College School in Wimbledon, London. He studied medicine on a scholarship at Balliol College, Oxford, obtaining degrees in both medicine and surgery, and then earned a doctorate in neurophysiology and neuroendocrinology. On completing his pre-clinical work, Horrobin became a fellow of Magdalen College, Oxford in 1963. At Magdalen, he was strongly influenced by the nutritionist Hugh Macdonald Sinclair and his hypotheses on essential fatty acids and degenerative disease.

Following participation in the Flying Doctor Service in east Africa, Horrobin was appointed as professor and chairman of medical physiology at Nairobi University in Kenya. In 1972, he moved to the University of Newcastle upon Tyne, where he was appointed as a reader in medical physiology. In 1975, he became professor of medicine at the University of Montreal.

== Drug companies and dietary supplements ==
=== Founding of Efamol and Scotia ===
While working as an academic investigator, in Africa and later, Horrobin developed a theory implicating altered fatty acid metabolism in schizophrenia. The idea did not generate interest, and Horrobin failed to obtain funding. It was noted that Horrobin presented only circumstantial evidence and was unable to propose a mechanism underlying the hypothesised link. To raise money for his research, Horrobin left academia and in 1977 established a company called Efamol to sell evening primrose oil (EPO) as a proposed treatment for various ailments. For example, Horrobin considered EPO to be a treatment for eczema "after trying it on the son of a librarian from his college". Horrobin planned to use the profits from Efamol to fund research and development of drugs containing EPO fatty acids. Efamol, renamed Scotia Pharmaceuticals in 1987, was active in Nova Scotia, Surrey and Scotland. In 1993, under Horrobin's leadership, Scotia was one of the first biotechnology companies to be floated on the London Stock Exchange. Scotia spent heavily on research, being ranked 79th among all UK companies in 1993, and reached a peak market capitalisation of about £600m in 1996. As a major shareholder of Scotia, Horrobin rose to number 212 in 1996 on the list of the wealthiest people in the United Kingdom.

=== Controversy and administration ===
==== Legal and regulatory problems ====
Horrobin, within several years of founding Efamol, was selling EPO in more than 25 countries. He marketed the supplement as a treatment for "PMS, alcoholism, pregnancy-induced hypertension, atopic eczema, elevated cholesterol levels, hypertension, scleroderma, multiple sclerosis, rheumatoid arthritis, mastalgia (breast pain) and other problems", but according to the United States Food and Drug Administration (FDA), Horrobin did not satisfactorily demonstrate the efficacy and safety of his supplement. The FDA advised Efamol not to ship EPO to the United States without obtaining approval. Horrobin agreed, but began making shipments. Horrobin conspired with General Nutrition, Inc. to process Efamol into capsules in California; it would then be sold to General Nutrition and relabeled for resale under a different brand name. According to an FDA investigation, Horrobin suggested marketing strategies to circumvent the laws, including coaching retail representatives on making oral claims to customers, "planting articles on their research in the media, deploying researchers to make claims on their behalf, using radio phone-ins" and other tactics. Horrobin wrote to General Nutrition, "Obviously you could not advertise Efamol for these purposes but equally obviously there are ways of getting the information across". As a result, the FDA began to seize shipments of EPO and handed down felony indictments to General Nutrition, several executives and store managers for "conspiring to defraud the FDA and violating provisions of the Food, Drug, and Cosmetic Act". General Nutrition and its president entered guilty pleas and paid fines, but Horrobin was not prosecuted.

Efamol continued to ship EPO into the United States and to market its products. In a 1989 article on "health food frauds", the New York Times reported on the FDA's seizure of "more than $1 million worth" of illegal EPO. The FDA again accused Efamol of marketing the oil "with unsubstantiated claims of treating a wide variety of illnesses". Efamol's lawyers responded that the product was not dangerous and that it had not made unsubstantiated claims. The American Dietetic Association, representing over 50,000 nutritionists, questioned the value of Horrobin's product since "one-tenth of a teaspoon of ordinary corn oil has as much of the fatty acids as a capsule of Evening Primrose Oil, at a fraction of the cost". In 1989, the FDA commissioned a report by investigator Stephen Barrett, a medical doctor and consumer protection advocate. Barrett advised the FDA that Horrobin's marketing of Efamol was done in "a transparent attempt to evade the food and drug laws". In a report on the incident published by the consumer information organisation Quackwatch, Barrett also questions Horrobin's research ethics: "Would someone that contemptuous of the law have any qualms about faking data?"

==== Allegations of selective reporting and research suppression ====
In 2006, a column in The Guardian suggested that Horrobin had also actively suppressed research findings contradicting his claims about EPO. Horrobin wrote a meta-analysis of EPO research on eczema in 1989, concluding that EPO was effective. Horrobin excluded the negative results of the largest published study to date but included purported results of seven of his own unpublished studies that remained unpublished as of 2006. When several scientists asked to see the unpublished data, Horrobin's legal team convinced the journal to refuse the request. In 1997, Horrobin's team successfully halted the publication of another meta-analysis commissioned by the Department of Health. Research published after Horrobin's death indicates that fatty acids are no more effective than a placebo against eczema; Scotia's medicines licences for evening primrose oil drugs was withdrawn.

==== Investor concerns about an "ailing company" ====
As the supplement sales generated revenue, Horrobin's company began work on numerous drugs, most of them containing evening primrose oil. In 1993, the company was floated and enjoyed several years of increasing capitalisation as Horrobin reassured investors who worried about the company's lack of success, operating losses and enigmatic nature. Horrobin stated that any of four products in Scotia's drugs pipeline could bring the company billions of pounds in revenue. In early 1995, Horrobin said that he hoped to receive approval in the "next 18 months to sell one or both" of two of these drugs. In late 1996, Horrobin predicted that he would receive approval for one of the drugs "in under two years". In 1997, Horrobin stated, "Scotia will be cash-positive by 2000".

However, the initial successes of Scotia on the stock markets and Horrobin's reassurances were undermined by what investors perceived as long-standing and systemic problems at the company, and they saw their fears confirmed with the rejection in March 1997 of regulatory approval for Scotia's drug Tarabetic. Also known as Efamol, the product contained evening primrose oil and was intended to treat diabetic peripheral neuropathy. Scotia immediately lost one quarter of its value. Licences for several evening primrose oil-containing drugs were later withdrawn. A Scotia product, Epogam, was reportedly the first drug to have its licence withdrawn as a result of "evidence that it didn't work".

By the end of 1997, Scotia was nearly broke and did not have enough money to fund another year of research. Investors worried that Horrobin had spread the company and its resources too thinly, a state described by The Guardian as "woolly, sprawling and lacking in focus". They also questioned Horrobin's judgement in promoting his wife to research manager of the company despite her lack of scientific or business training; her highest qualification was a BA in English and women's studies. Investors were restive about Horrobin's emphasis on products related to evening primrose oil, which they considered a "hippy" project, "outmoded and of questionable scientific validity". When it was found that borage contained a higher percentage of gamma-linolenic acid than did the evening primrose, rival companies had begun to take market share of the supplement. In 1996, The Independent described Scotia's supplement business as "struggling". Horrobin responded to the borage competition by accusing his rivals of "duping women, selling pigs in pokes and marketing 'unstable and potentially toxic products'."

Findings of fraud associated with Scotia trials also weighed on Horrobin's company. Goran Jamal, a doctor who had participated in developing Efamol, was found guilty of research fraud by the General Medical Council in 2003. The Council ruled that Jamal had committed "serious professional misconduct for falsifying his results", manipulating the supposed randomisation of the clinical trial conducted over a decade earlier. Scotia was faulted by industry observers for what was called a "highly unusual" compensation scheme, as it had offered the doctor a portion of profits from future sales, although the Council suggested that Jamal was prompted to commit fraud by his "belief" in the efficacy of the drug and not by his desire for financial gain.

==== Horrobin's ousting from Scotia ====
Horrobin was ousted as chief executive of Scotia by a unanimous vote of the board and was replaced on 1 January 1998 by Robert Dow, whom Horrobin had hired several months earlier to help with the company's business plan and investor relations. Horrobin remained until May 1998 as a non-executive director. When he tried to stage a "boardroom coup" to return himself to the executive position, the other directors refused to support him, and Horrobin resigned. As the company's value fell from about £600 m to £16 m, Horrobin and his successor each blamed the other for the company's failure. Scotia went into administration in 2001.

=== Laxdale Ltd ===
Following his departure from Scotia, Horrobin set up a new company, Laxdale Ltd, to examine the use of omega-3 essential fatty acids in treating schizophrenia and neurodegenerative diseases. The company was sold after his death to the Amarin Corporation and is now known as Amarin Neuroscience Ltd.

== Research, publications and editorships ==
Horrobin was a prolific writer of academic and popular works. He was also the founder/co-founder and editor of two journals, and, with his brother Peter, the co-founder of MTP Press. Peter Horrobin later founded a religious cult, Ellel Ministries.

=== Scientific publications ===
Horrobin was an author on over 800 publications, including about 500 scientific papers, many of which appeared in journals he edited. Horrobin's belief in a connection between fatty acids and schizophrenia guided much of his career. From 1970, Horrobin was medical adviser to the Schizophrenia Society of Great Britain. He later served as the Society's president. Horrobin also wrote on other scientific issues. He considered research with animal models of human disease to be a waste of resources, and believed that large-scale clinical trials were unnecessary and unethical. However, in at least one case, he defended modern medicine by writing a critique of Ivan Illich's famous attack on the medical establishment, Medical Nemesis.

=== Journal editor ===
Horrobin was a longtime critic of the anonymous peer review system, which, he believed, stifled creativity and innovation in science. Horrobin founded and edited the non-peer reviewed journal Medical Hypotheses to provide an outlet for unorthodox ideas and research that would not be evaluated by other scientists before publication. Horrobin envisioned the journal as a resort for thinkers who were "very good at generating ideas, but are complete klutzes in the field" and committed to publishing ideas based only on whether he or other reviewers considered them "interesting and reasonable".

Horrobin also co-founded the journal Prostaglandins, Leukotrienes and Essential Fatty Acids. Science writer Susan Allport, in her book on dietary fatty acids, states that Horrobin founded this journal to disseminate his ideas about evening primrose oil and fatty acids.

=== Popular science ===
In the popular science book The Madness of Adam and Eve (2001), Horrobin outlined his hypothesis that schizophrenia contributed to the evolution of modern humans. According to Horrobin, fat metabolism was altered as humans evolved from other primates, leading to early humans with schizophrenia. These humans were more creative and did not experience as much physical pain as others. Horrobin suggested that the "genes for schizophrenia are responsible for most of the religious sense, most of the technical and artistic creativity and most of the leadership qualities of modern human beings". The Madness of Adam and Eve was one of six books shortlisted for the 2002 Aventis Prize (now the Royal Society Prizes for Science Books; the prize was won that year by Stephen Hawking's The Universe in a Nutshell). Reviews of the book were mixed, writing of a "useful contribution" that was also "highly partisan and selective"; an "engaging and plausible argument" that is "not so convincingly" argued; and a book "brightly written" but with "a huge hole in its central premise" Horrobin was somewhat critical of his theory, describing it as a "just-so story perhaps fed by my own personal delusions". The book was compared unfavorably to similar works by Kay Redfield Jamison, who examines a possible link between bipolar disorder and artistic creativity.

Tim Crow, a professor of psychiatry at Oxford University who had proposed a similar theory in 1995, accused Horrobin of failing to acknowledge Crow's contributions to the development of his ideas. When novelist Sebastian Faulks stated that Horrobin's ideas influenced his novel Human Traces, published in 2005, Crow protested that "much of the credit for his theory has been misdirected by Faulks to the late maverick doctor and writer, David Horrobin".

== Death and obituary controversy ==
In 2001, Horrobin was diagnosed with mantle cell lymphoma. He died of pneumonia as a complication of this cancer in 2003. Horrobin was survived by his wife, Sherri Clarkson, and two children from a previous marriage. A number of obituaries were published, both in medical journals such as The Lancet and Horrobin's Prostaglandins, Leukotrienes and Essential Fatty Acids, and in the popular press. Most obituaries referred to Horrobin as a highly intelligent, creative and persuasive individual. According to The Telegraph, Horrobin was "a founding father of the biotechnology industry and regarded by some as one of Britain's finest original thinkers in medicine", but the same obituary also noted that Horrobin's implication of fatty acid metabolism in schizophrenia was not accepted by other scientists; that his approach was "unorthodox" and unpopular; and that his major business venture failed. The many problems at Scotia under Horrobin's leadership, which led to the company's eventual collapse, were a theme in several obituaries including two highly critical and controversial accounts written by former Horrobin colleague Caroline Richmond and published in the British Medical Journal (BMJ) and The Independent.

The BMJ obituary sparked a months-long controversy. The obituary described Horrobin as "effortlessly prolific" and "one of the most persuasive people on earth", but also criticised him as excessively promoting evening primrose oil despite a lack of scientific evidence, noting that some critics questioned his ethics. It suggested that Horrobin "may prove to be the greatest snake oil salesman of his age", stating that his evening primrose oil would "go down in history as the remedy for which there is no disease" and reporting that several of Scotia's product licences were later withdrawn because the drugs were ineffective. The obituary generated the largest e-mail response to an obituary in the history of the BMJ. Respondents, including Horrobin's colleagues, friends and family, were largely critical of the negative tone of the obituary. On behalf of Horrobin's family, Horrobin's son-in-law, Adam Kelliher, filed a complaint with the British Press Complaints Commission, alleging that the BMJ obituary was "inaccurate" and "intrusive at a time of grief" in violation of the Code of Practice. Kelliher was founder and at the time chief executive of Equazen, a company marketing fish and evening primrose oils including a formulation called eye q, said to improve scholastic ability in children. However, in his initial complaint to the BMJ Kelliher stated that he had no competing interests. In reaction, the BMJ published an apology to Horrobin's family expressing regret for any distress caused. The journal corrected what its editor considered several insignificant spelling and factual errors and published three further obituaries of Horrobin. However, the journal also defended its original obituary as fairly presenting "both the positive and negative aspects of its subject's life". Kelliher did not accept the BMJ apology as genuine and maintained that inaccuracies and "unjustified slander" remained, but the Press Complaints Commission declined to take any action against the journal, stating that the BMJ had offered "sufficient remedial action". According to the commission, the journal was not obliged to omit negative information, including the journal's contention "that Dr Horrobin was 'in some ways a charlatan'".

== Posthumous honours ==
In June 2004, the scientific publisher Elsevier, having acquired the journal Medical Hypotheses, created an annual David Horrobin Prize for medical theory in his honour. He was posthumously awarded the Stephen S. Chang Award by the American Oil Chemists' Society in 2003.

== Selected bibliography ==
- Horrobin, David F. (1964). The Communication Systems of the Body. New York: Basic Books. p. 214. ISBN 0-465-01287-6.
- Horrobin, David F. (1970). Principles of biological control. Aylesbury: Medical and Technical Pub. Co., Ltd. p. 70. ISBN 0-85200-002-2.
- Horrobin, David F. (1971). Essential Biochemistry, Endocrinology and Nutrition. New York: Medical and Technical Publishing Co. Ltd. p. 118. ISBN 0-85200-025-1.
- Horrobin, David F. (1972). A Guide to Kenya and Northern Tanzania. Scribner. p. 304. ISBN 0-684-12629-X.
- Horrobin, David F. (1977). Medical Hubris: A reply to Ivan Illich. Montreal: Lunesdale House. p. 146. ISBN 0-88831-086-2.
- Horrobin, David F. (1983). "The role of essential fatty acids and prostaglandins in the premenstrual syndrome". J Reprod Med. 28 (7): 465–8. PMID 6350579.
- Horrobin, David F. (1987). "Essential fatty acids, prostaglandins, and alcoholism: an overview". Alcohol Clin Exp Res. 11 (1): 2–9. doi:10.1111/j.1530-0277.1987.tb01250.x. PMID 3032012.
- Horrobin, David F. (Ed.) (1990). Omega-6 essential fatty acids: pathophysiology and roles in clinical medicine. New York: Wiley-Liss. ISBN 0-471-56693-4.
- Horrobin, David F. (1990). "Gamma linolenic acid". Reviews in Contemporary Pharmacotherapy. 1 (1). Carnforth, UK: Marius Press: 1–45. ISSN 0954-8602. OCLC 729348324.
- Horrobin, David F. (1993). "Omega-6 and omega-3 essential fatty acids in atherosclerosis". Semin Thromb Hemost. 19 (2): 129–37. doi:10.1055/s-2007-994016. PMID 8356458. S2CID 40590225.
- Horrobin, David F. (1994). "Unsaturated lipids: a new approach to the treatment of cancer". World Rev Nutr Diet. World Review of Nutrition and Dietetics. 76: 77–80. doi:10.1159/000423997. ISBN 978-3-8055-6040-5. PMID 7856241.
- Horrobin, David F. (1997). "Essential fatty acids in the management of impaired nerve function in diabetes". Diabetes. 46 (Suppl 2): S90–3. doi:10.2337/diab.46.2.s90. PMID 9285506. S2CID 10174746.
- Horrobin, David F. (2000). "Essential fatty acid metabolism and its modification in atopic eczema". Am J Clin Nutr. 71 (1 Suppl): 367S–72S. doi:10.1093/ajcn/71.1.367s. PMID 10617999.
- Horrobin, David F. (2001). The madness of Adam & Eve: how schizophrenia shaped humanity. London: Bantam. ISBN 0-593-04649-8.
- Peet, M. (2003). Glen I; Horrobin DF (eds.). Phospholipid spectrum disorders in psychiatry and neurology (2nd ed.). Carnforth, UK: Marius Press. ISBN 1-871622-25-5.

A more extensive bibliography is available on the Institute for Scientific Information website.
