= Tools for Conviviality =

Book by Ivan Illich

- First edition
- Author: Ivan Illich
- Published: 1973 (Harper & Row)
- Pages: 110
- ISBN: 9780714509730

Tools for Conviviality is a 1973 book by Ivan Illich exploring the history of technology and tools. Illich proposes the idea of a 'convivial tool', one which allows its user to exercise their human autonomy and creativity. He draws a contrast between these convivial tools, which extend human capability, and the tools of industrial society, which have gone beyond that original goal and have become destructive to human autonomy and ingenuity. The book introduced Illich's concept of 'conviviality' and of a 'radical monopoly', ideas which have become influential to the discourse around degrowth and appropriate technology.

== Concepts ==
=== Two watersheds ===
Illich identifies two thresholds in the development of any tool, which he calls the "two watersheds". New knowledge at the 'first watershed' has great benefits until later at the 'second watershed' the benefits are used to justify manipulation by a professional elite. He uses the example of modern medicine to illustrate his point, identifying the first watershed as occurring around 1913, the point at which a patient visiting a doctor had, for the first time, a better than 50% chance of receiving an effective treatment. The second watershed, crossed in the middle of the 20th century, is defined by the harm done by the medical system itself in the form of increasing iatrogenesis, medicalization, professionalization of the medical elites, and delegitimization of traditional providers of medical care.

=== Conviviality ===
Influenced by various meanings of the word 'convivial' and its cognates in Spanish and French, Illich uses the word to describe "responsibly limited tools", drawing a contrast with the tools of industrial society:

I choose the term “conviviality” to designate the opposite of industrial productivity. I intend it to mean autonomous and creative intercourse among persons, and the intercourse of persons with their environment; and this in contrast with the conditioned response of persons to the demands made upon them by others, and by a man-made environment. I consider conviviality to be individual freedom realized in personal interdependence and, as such, an intrinsic ethical value. I believe that, in any society, as conviviality is reduced below a certain level, no amount of industrial productivity can effectively satisfy the needs it creates among society’s members.

His definition of 'tools' is broad and "include[s] among tools productive institutions such as factories that produce tangible commodities like corn flakes or electric current, and productive systems for intangible commodities such as those which produce “education”, “health”, “knowledge”, or “decisions”". He argues that all such tools can become manipulative to their users when 'means' are overtaken by 'ends' - when tools become complicated to the point that humans are used by them rather than using them.

=== Radical monopoly ===
Tools for Conviviality also introduced Illich's idea of a 'radical monopoly', which describes a technology or service which becomes so exceptionally dominant that even with multiple providers, its users are excluded from society without access to the product. His initial example is the effect of cars on societies, where the car itself shaped cities by its needs, so much so that people without cars become excluded from participation in cities.

== See also ==
Related economic and technological concepts

- appropriate technology
- human-centered design
- planned obsolescence
- right to repair

Other influences, contemporaries and disciples

- Jacques Ellul, author of The Technological Society (1954)
- Lee Felsenstein, active in the early PC movement
- Lewis Mumford, author of The Myth of the Machine (1967)
- E. F. Schumacher, author of Small Is Beautiful (1973)
