= St. Cecilia Church and Convent =

Church in Manhattan, New York

- St. Cecilia Church
- U.S. National Register of Historic Places
- New York City Landmark
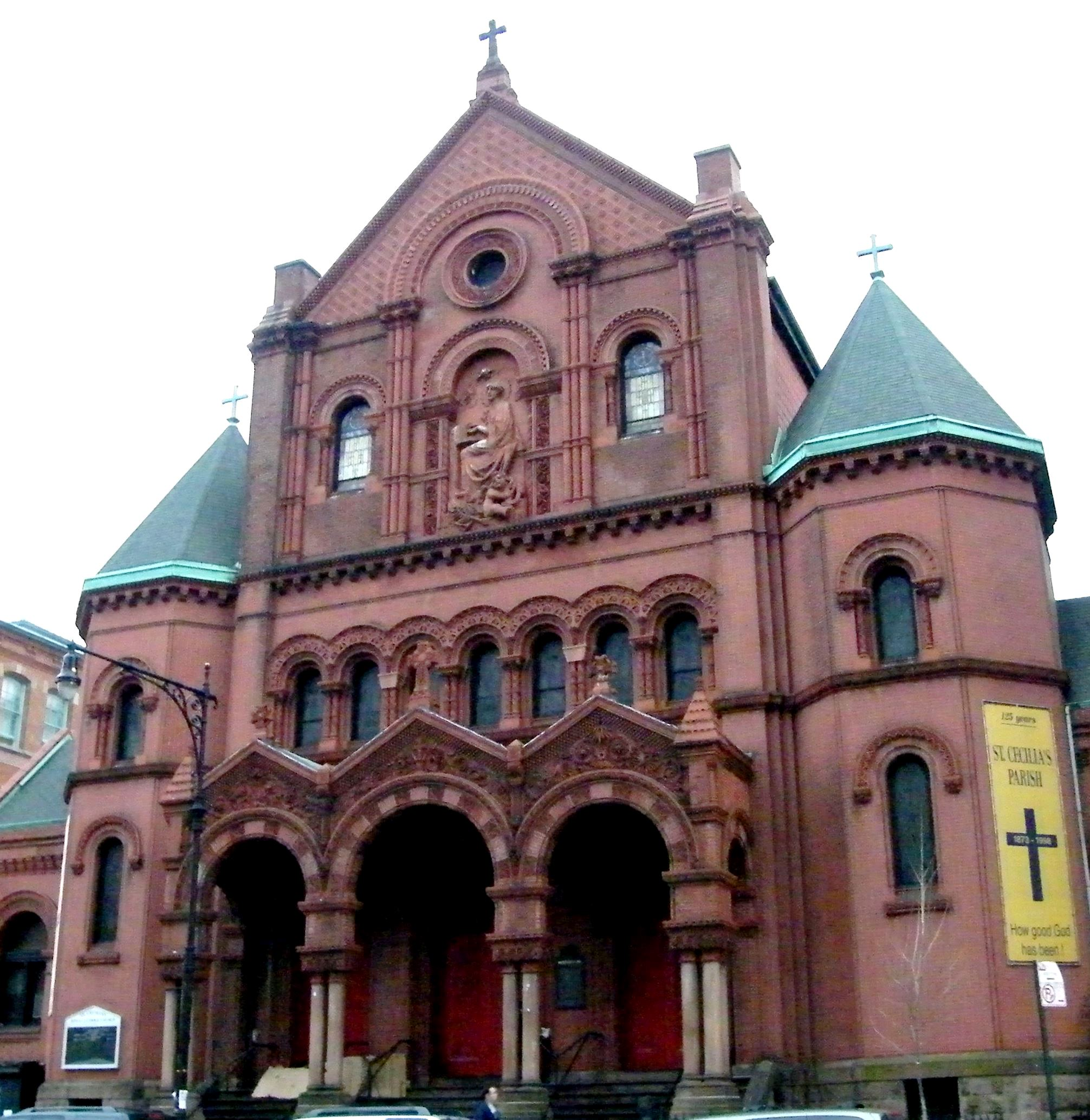
- (2009)

- Location within Manhattan
- Location: 112-120 E. 106th St., Manhattan, New York City
- Coordinates: 40°47′32″N 73°56′50″W
- Built: 1883-1887 (for church);
- Architects: Napoleon LeBrun & Sons (for church); Neville & Basse; Thomas J. Duff of 348 West 14th Street (for 1927 dwelling)
- Architectural style: Romanesque Revival
- NRHP reference No.: 84002796

Significant dates
- Added to NRHP: February 2, 1984
- Designated NYCL: September 14, 1976

St. Cecilia Church is a Roman Catholic parish church in the Roman Catholic Archdiocese of New York and a historic landmark located at 120 East 106th Street between Park Avenue and Lexington Avenue, Manhattan, New York City, New York. The parish was established in 1873. It was staffed by the Redemptorist Fathers from 1939 to 2007. The church was designated a New York City landmark in 1976. The church and convent were listed on the U.S. National Register of Historic Places in 1984.

== History ==
St. Cecilia's parish developed from the southern portion of St. Paul's for what was then a predominantly Irish congregation. In the summer of 1873, the Very Reverend Hugh Flattery established a chapel in the Old Red House, a resort hotel located on 105th Street in East Harlem, until a small frame church was built, which was dedicated on August 20, 1873. In 1881, his successor, Monsignor William P. Flannelly purchased land on 106th St. and commenced building a church. The cornerstone was laid on September 9, 1883. Services were conducted in the completed basement, and the old church was donated to Holy Rosary parish and moved to E. 119th St. The church was dedicated by Archbishop Michael Corrigan on November 27, 1887.

Rev. Michael J. Phelan became pastor in 1884. He completed the church and built the parish school, St. Cecilia's Institute, staffed by the Sisters of Mercy, who also conducted a home for working women. The home for working women ceased operations in the late 1930s, leaving only the sisters in the building. In November 1956, the Sisters of the Atonement opened a kindergarten and day care on the first floor.

The parish of the Church of the Holy Agony was merged into that of St. Cecilia's.

In July 2018, the parish conducted a "Street Mass" outside the church to reach out to homebound and fallen-away Catholics who live within the parish boundaries, and also accommodate parishioners physically unable to navigate the church's steep steps.

== Architecture ==
Constructed of brick and terra cotta, building began in 1883 to designs by Napoleon LeBrun & Sons in the Romanesque Revival style; it was completed in 1877. Father Phelan acted as general contractor. The "...façade includes a porch that is supported by ten red granite columns, above which are seven stained glass windows. A large terra cotta relief of St. Cecilia, playing an organ is embedded into an arched panel on the building’s central gable. An octagonal tower flanks each side of the front. The AIA Guide to New York City (2010) describes the church as an "ornate brick and terra-cotta facade is one of East Harlem's special treasures. Neo-Italian Romanesque, it has an exuberance that evaded most of Northern Europe."

Adjacent to the church, the "Regina Angelorum" was built 1907 to the designs of Neville & Bagge, a façade that unites what was a home for working women built in 1883 and a convent built in 1885. "In the late 1930s, the convent took over the entire building until 2004, when the building was converted to the Cristo Rey New York High School."

In 1927, the church built a four-storey brick dwelling house at 123-25 East 105th Street to designs by Thomas J. Duff of 348 West 14th Street for $60,000.

It was listed on the U.S. National Register of Historic Places in 1984.

== See also ==
- Saint Cecilia's Catholic Church (Brooklyn)
