= Limits to Medicine =

1975 book by Ivan Illich

- Author: Ivan Illich
- Language: English
- Published: 1975

Limits to Medicine, also known as Medical Nemesis, is a book by Ivan Illich, first published in 1975. Illich claimed that medicine had increasingly gained social control over people's lives, leading to iatrogenic effects, with physicians as the key players in the process.

== Central Idea ==
The central idea of the book is that medicine - especially modern medicine - is not as good and effective as physicians make it out to be. It has its inherent weaknesses, which are often deliberately suppressed by the medical establishment. Consider the introduction of the book, which begins with this statement, "The medical establishment has become a major threat to health".

== See also ==
- David Horrobin
- David Cayley
- Nassim Nicholas Taleb - author of the book Antifragile (2012) which heavily leans into the term Iatrogenics
