= Villa Regenstreif =

Coordinates: 48.2411°N 16.3141°E

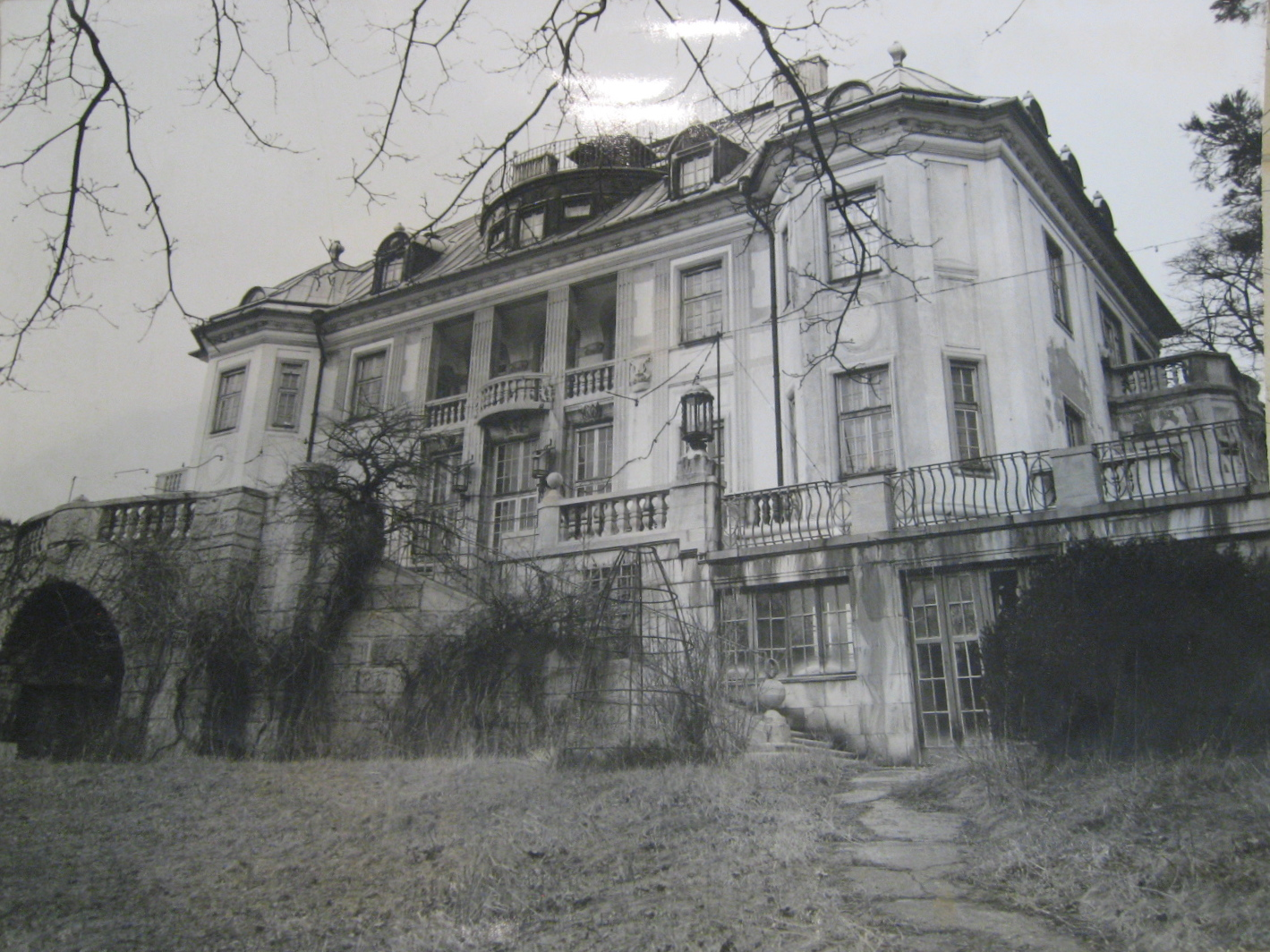
Villa Regenstreif in between WW1 and WWII

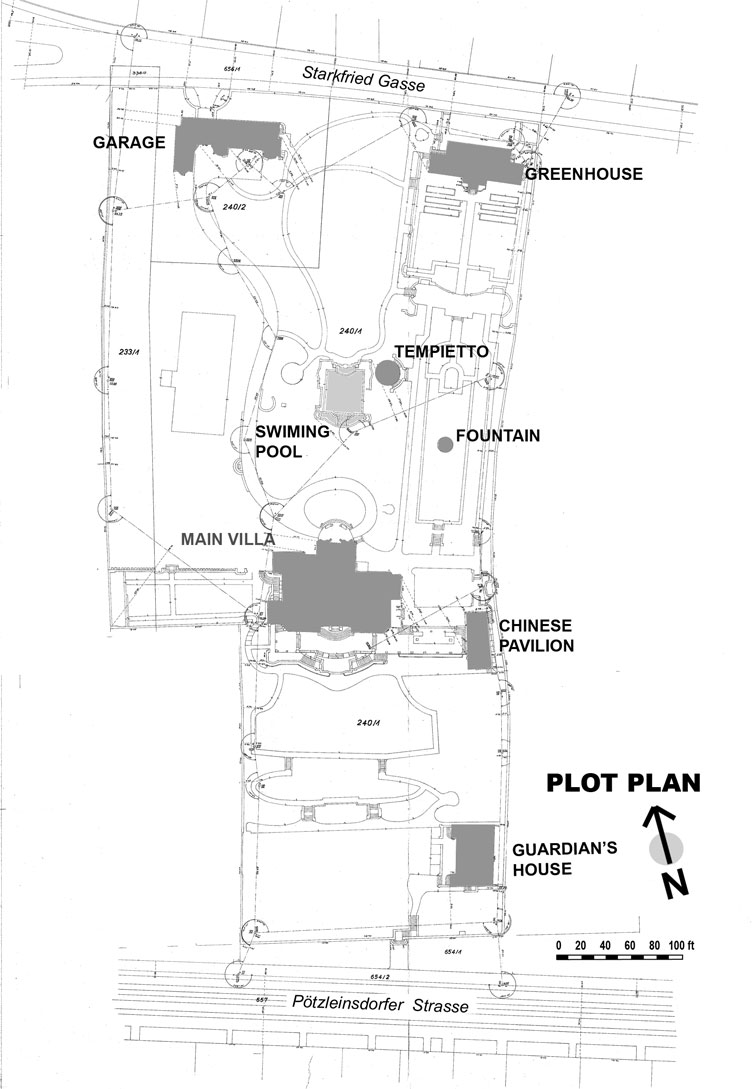
Villa Regenstreif

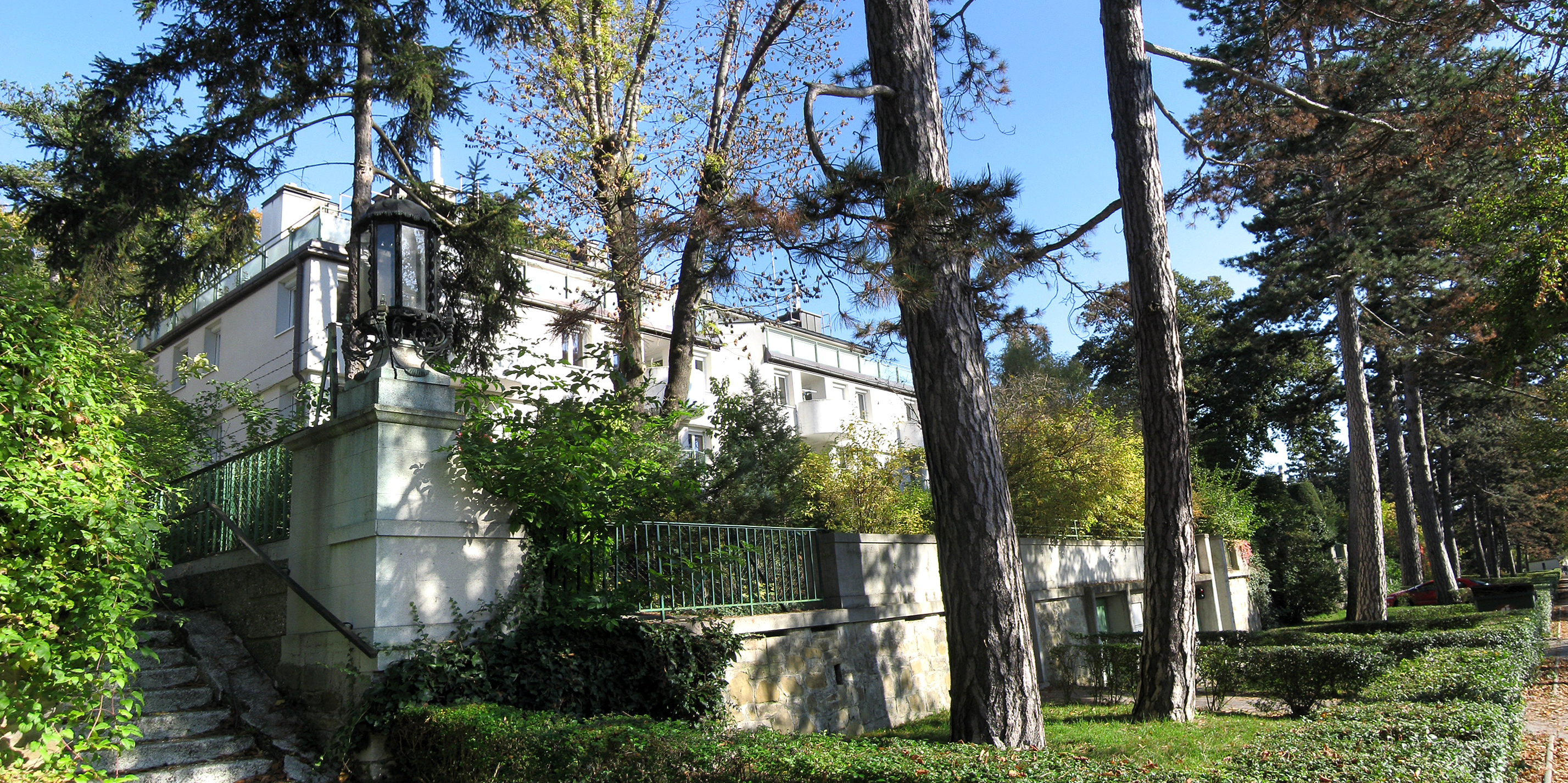
View of the property from Pötzleinsdorfer Straße today. The lantern and the wall are still original

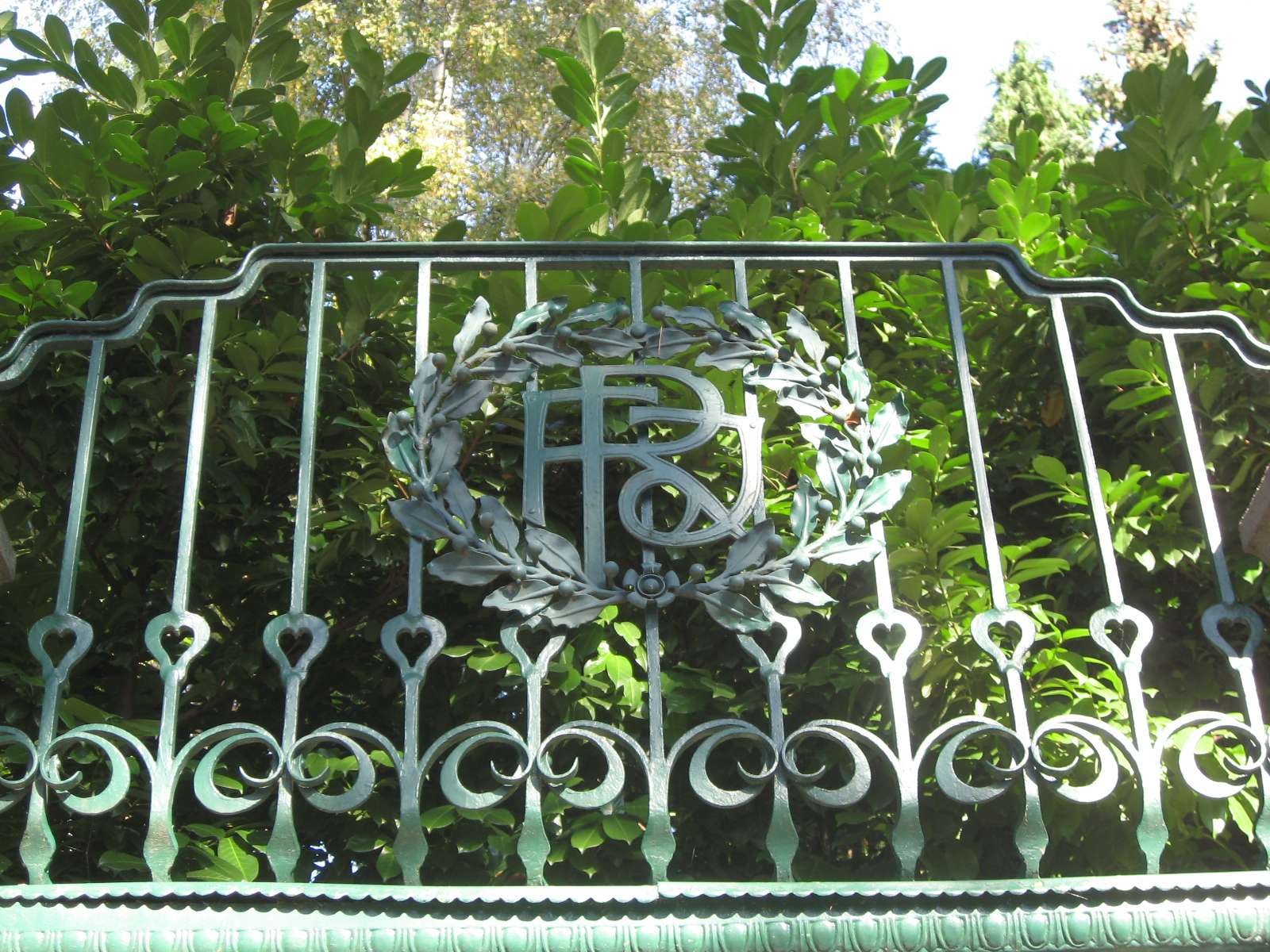
Entrance gate Pötzleinsdorfer Straße, above the gate the monogram of Fritz and Johanna Regenstreif

Villa Regenstreif was a villa in Währing, the 18th district of Vienna, Austria, commissioned by Fritz Regenstreif and built by Friedrich Ohmann. The property bordered Pötzleinsdorfer Strasse 36–38 to the south and Starkfriedgasse 15 to the north.

== History ==
Villa Regenstreif was commissioned by the industrialist Friedrich ("Fritz") Regenstreif (Czernowitz 14 November 1868 - 8 May 1941 Vienna) and built between 1913 and 1917 by the architect Friedrich Ohmann in a romantic style with slightly baroque elements, particularly in the design of the roofs. The manor house was magnificently furnished, the spacious salons and private rooms were clad throughout with artistically decorated wooden panels and marble slabs. The basement housed a separate cinema, a bowling alley and an orangery.

The villa was surrounded on all sides by a 2-hectare garden with trees, and many sculptures adorned the façade and the garden. The outbuildings included the gatehouse on Pötzleinsdorfer Strasse, a garage building with its own workshop and a glass palm house, both on Starkfriedgasse, a Chinese pavilion near the manor house and a swimming pool.

In March 1941, Fritz Regenstreif was forced to sell his villa to the National Socialist German Labor Front (DAF) for far less than its true value due to his Jewish ancestry; Regenstreif died that same year. Fritz Regenstreif's wife Johanna, née Ortlieb (Munich December 12, 1877 - June 22, 1934 Vienna), was no longer alive. Both their children Paul Regenstreif, born in Munich in 1899, and Ellen Illich (with her three children, including Ivan Illich), born in Munich in 1901, had to flee in 1942.

For fear of having to pass on the loot to Magda Goebbels, who had also shown interest in the villa, the DAF immediately began transporting the precious inventory to Berlin. The wooden panelling on the ceilings and walls was removed with hoes and burned, the remaining interior decoration was completely looted, and finally small office cubicles were provisionally set up, which were used by the Nazi organization National Socialist People's Welfare from 1943 until the liberation of Vienna in 1945. The organization wanted to set up a convalescent home for war-disabled officers in the villa.

From 1945 to 1955, the area was located in the US sector of Vienna. The building was rented by the US and used as an officers' club for officers of the United States Air Force.

At the end of the restitution proceedings, which lasted from 1948 to 1953, Fritz Regenstreif's heirs received back the villa, which had been completely devastated and rendered unusable on the inside. The family sold in 1958.

In the early 1960s, the villa was briefly discussed as the official residence of the Federal President; Adolf Schärf held the office at the time. On March 17, 1964, a fire broke out during renovation work, which led to the building being demolished. Today there is a student residence on the site.

The gatehouse (Pötzleinsdorfer Straße 36), a water basin (the former fountain), a pavilion, walls and some lanterns have been preserved to this day.

== Residents ==
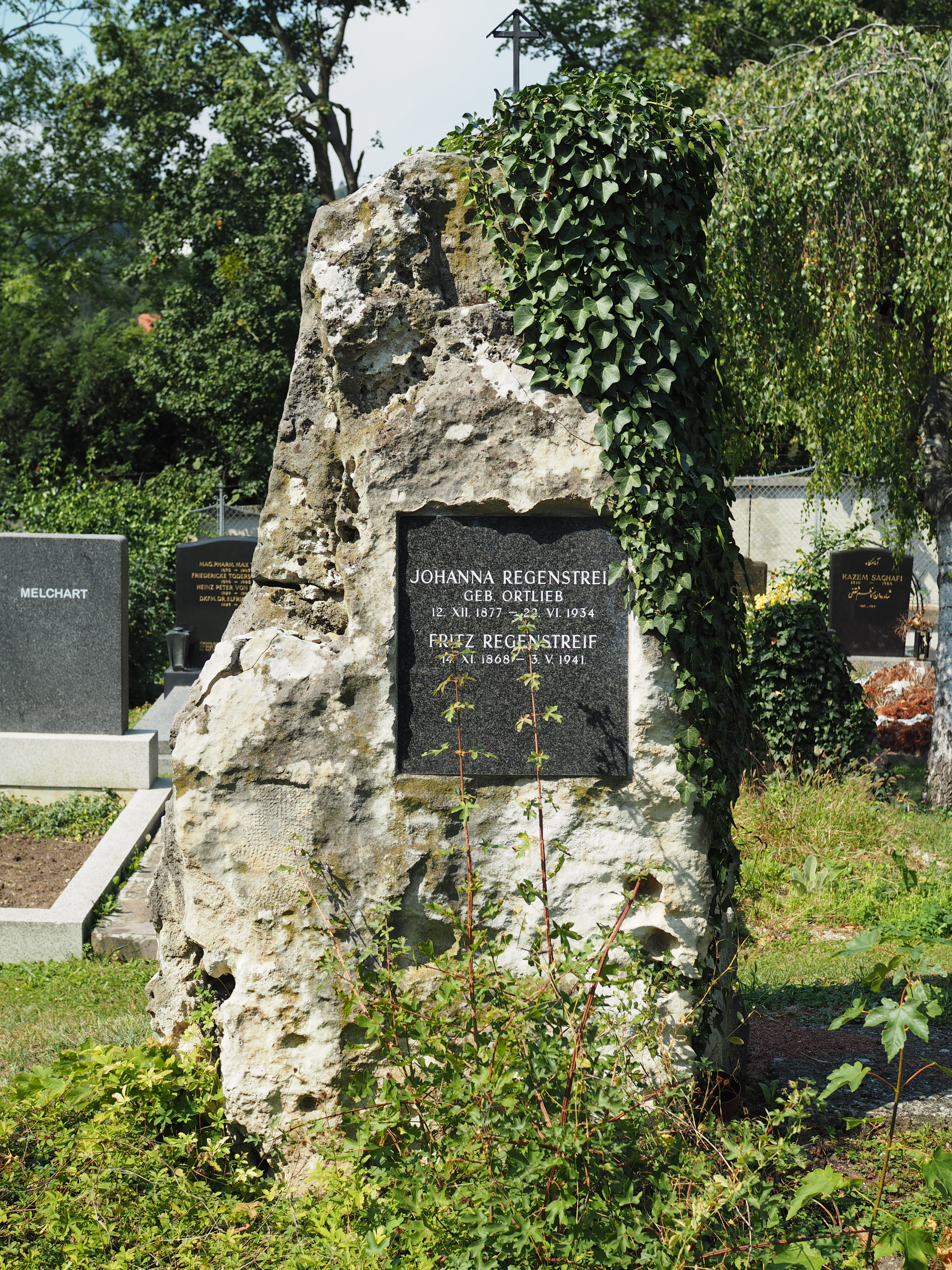
Fritz and Johanna Regenstreif's grave at the Pötzleinsdorf cemetery

The owner Fritz Regenstreif had become wealthy as a timber industrialist in Bosnia and Herzegovina. His daughter Ellen Rose (Maexie) Illich, née Regenstreif, and her three children Ivan, Mischa and Sascha lived in the villa, which they affectionately called "Pötz", from 1932 to 1942. Her son Ivan Illich became famous for describing the scenic atmosphere of Pötzleinsdorf and his feelings and thoughts on March 10, 1938 - two days before the "Anschluss of Austria" - in his text Loss of World and Flesh (Illich was eleven years old at the time).

Grandfather Regenstreif managed to buy his family's freedom from being murdered by the Gestapo. Then the family had to flee via Italy with false passports.

The gravesite of Fritz and Johanna Regenstreif is located at the Pötzleinsdorf cemetery (Group B, Row 14, No. 156); the gravestone erroneously states the date of Fritz Regenstreif's death as May 3.

== Literature ==
- Friedrich Achleitner: Österreichische Architektur im 20. Jahrhundert. Band III/2: Wien, 13.–18. Bezirk. Residenz Verlag, Salzburg 1995, ISBN 3-7017-0704-9, S 226
- Dieter Klein, Martin Kupf, Robert Schediwy: Stadtbildverluste Wien – Ein Rückblick auf fünf Jahrzehnte. LIT, Wien 2005, ISBN 3-8258-7754-X
- Sascha Illich: Our Pötz: Pictures of my Grandfather's Villa in Pötzleinsdorf, Vienna. saschapress, 2007
- Nationalfonds der Republik Österreich für Opfer des Nationalsozialismus, Schiedsinstanz für Naturalrestitution, Entscheidungsnummer 531 / 2009
- Michaela Scharf: Filmen als Selbstbehauptung.Ellen Illichs Familienfilme im Kontext nationalsozialistischer Verfolgung. In: Zeithistorische Forschungen 19 (2022), S. 170–185.
