= Friedrich Regenstreif =

Jewish industrialist and art collector

Friedrich "Fritz" Regenstreif (1868–1941) was a Jewish industrialist and art collector whose Villa in Vienna was Aryanized along with his companies.

== Life ==
Regensteif owned lumber businesses. His companies included Krivaja Sumska Industrija A.D. (later Krivaja Forstindustrie, AG, vorm. Eissler &(or i) Ortlieb Zavidovici (in Bosnia also known as Bos. Sum ind. Ajsler I). Shareholders included the Bosnian government, merged with the former Otto Steinbeiss timber company into a forest industry syndicate "SIPAD" (Sumsko Industrijsko Produzece a.d. (Sipad) Sarajevo)), later "Aryanized" into Holzbauwerke Breslau

== Family ==
Regenstreif's son Paul was born on 21 January 1899. He married Therese (née Wolf) (1902-1991).

Regenstreif's daughter, Ellen Rose (Maexie) Illich, had three children, one of whom was the philosopher Ivan Illich.

== Villa ==
Regenstreif had the famous Villa Regenstreif built at 18. Wiener Gemeindebezirk Währing, Pötzleinsdorfer Straße 36–38. The villa was later Aryanized under the Nazis.

== Nazi era ==
In March 1941, Friedrich Regenstreif was forced to sell Villa Regenstreif (building plus c. 2 hectares of land) together with its valuable inventory to the National Socialist German Labor Front (DAF) for 550,000 Reichsmark. Shortly afterwards he died. In March 1942, Regenstreif's son and heir Paul, had to flee Vienna to escape Nazi persecution. In September 1942, his daughter and heir, the then Italian citizen Ellen, emigrated to Florence via Split with her three children. After Magda Goebbels, the wife of Reich Propaganda Minister Joseph Goebbels, showed interest in acquiring the property, it was transferred to the National Socialist People's Welfare Organization (NSV) in 1943. The NSV planned to build a convalescent home for war-disabled officers of the German Wehrmacht on the site." (Q: Press release decision no. 531/2009, Arbitration Panel for In Rem Restitution)

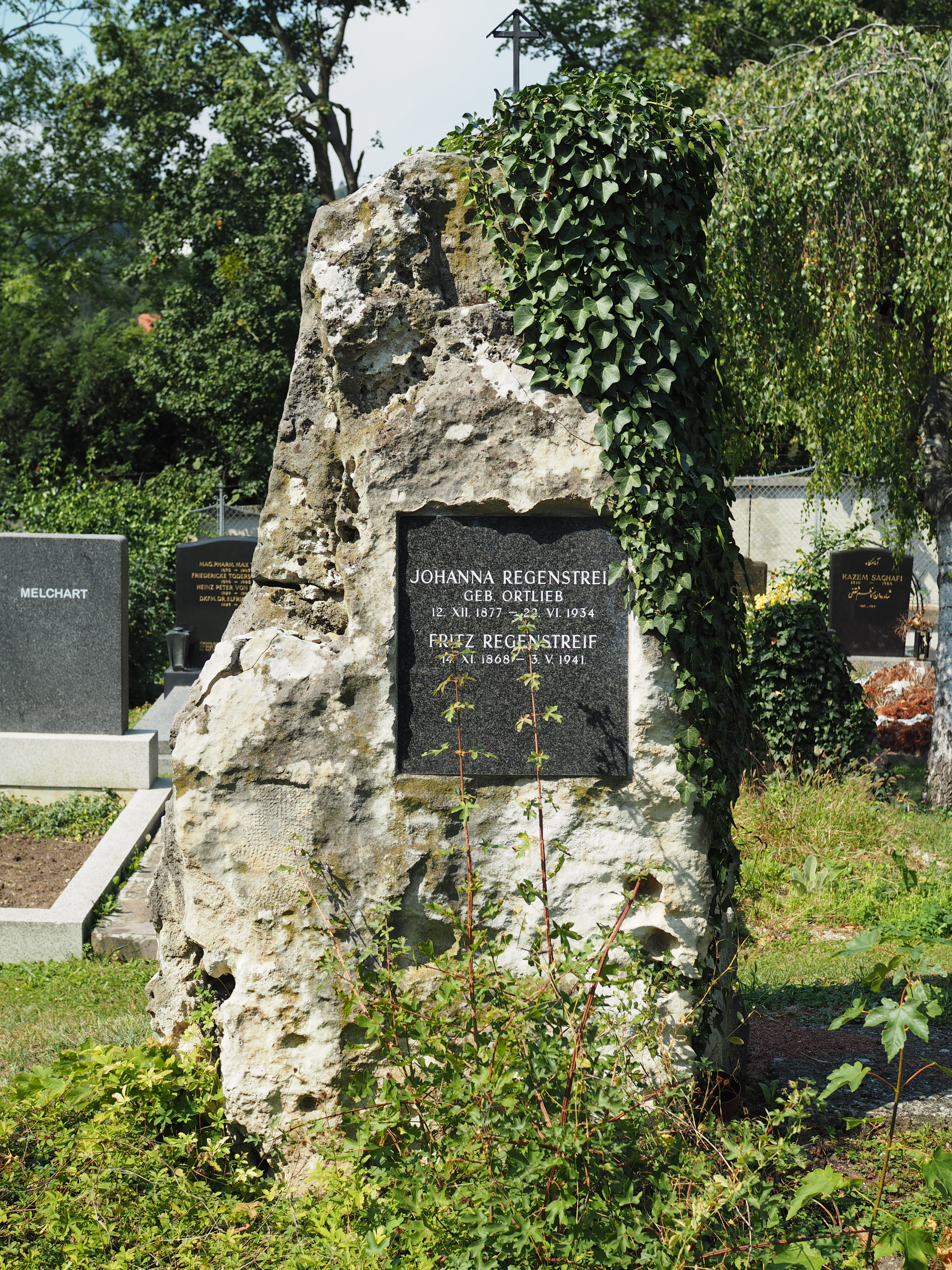
Grave of Fritz Regenstreif and his wife Johanna (née Ortlieb), Vienna, 2019

== Postwar ==
From 1945 to 1955, the US authorities rented the building. Although the exterior of the villa was intact, the interior was destroyed. In 1958, the decision was made to sell it; the building burned down in 1964.

== Claims for restitution ==
After long effort to calculate the damage, the Republic of Austria recognized in a settlement concluded with Ellen in 1953 that the damage incurred exceeded the amount of 250,000 Schilling and waved the repayment obligation.

In 1954, Ellen I. sold her half of the property to the other half owner, her sister-in-law Therese R. After several sales, the majority of the property came into the possession of the Federal Chamber of Commerce in the 1960s. In 1964, Villa R. fell victim to a fire and was demolished. Following the construction of several student residences, the property was transferred to BUWOG GmbH, a housing association of the Republic of Austria, in the 1980s. (Q: Press release decision no. 531/2009, Arbitration Panel for In Rem Restitution)

== Literature ==
Ivan Illich: Verlust von Welt und Fleisch o.O., 1938; Sascha Illich: Our Pötz: Pictures of my Grandfathers Villa in Pötzleinsdorf, Vienna. saschapress, 2007; Österreichischer Nationalfond, Schiedsinstanz für Naturalrestitution, Entscheidungsnummer 531/2009; http://de.wikipedia.org/wiki/Villa_Regenstreif; Pressemitteilung Entscheidung Nr. 531/2009, Schiedsinstanz für Naturalrestitution;
