= Incarnation School (Manhattan) =

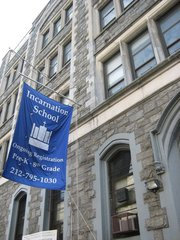

Location
- 570 West 175th Street; Washington Heights, Manhattan, New York City, New York 10033; United States; 40°50′41.21″N 73°56′8.91″W

Information
- School type: Parochial elementary
- Motto: "For God and country"
- Religious affiliation: Roman Catholic
- Established: 1910 (116 years ago)
- Closed: 2026
- Grades: K–8
- Language: English
- Campus type: Urban
- Slogan: "Building a bridge to the future in Washington Heights since 1910"
- Team name: Tyros, Debs and Varsity Teams
- Website: incarnationnyc.org

Incarnation School was a private Catholic elementary school in the Washington Heights neighborhood of Manhattan in New York City, New York, U.S. It was founded in 1910.

== History ==
In 1908, the Rev. Patrick J. Mahoney was assigned to establish a parish in Washington Heights to relieve overcrowding at St. Elizabeth's and St. Rose of Lima Parishes. The new parish was christened Incarnation.

To meet the new challenge, Father Mahoney rented a store at 1253 St. Nicholas Avenue between 172nd and 173rd Street and used it as a temporary chapel with the Holy Sacrifice of the Mass being offered there for the first time on Sunday, September 6, 1908.

On November 1, 1908, he relocated his temporary chapel to the corner of St. Nicholas Avenue and 171st Street. By the end of the year, Incarnation had purchased eight lots at the corner of St. Nicholas Avenue and 175th Street for $78,000.

The first step of establishing the center of the Parish, the altar about which all parish activity would revolve, had been accomplished. Three months after the opening of the chapel, Father Mahoney instituted a regular Sunday School program, with a priest, two Sisters of Charity, and a number of lay teachers, to respond to the challenge of providing religious instructions for the children. His next task was to organize the Senior and Junior Holy Name Societies, the Children of Mary, the Sacred Heart Society, two young people's clubs, the Incarnation Lyceum for young men, and a Young Women's Club. To assist Father Mahoney in carrying out his emerging program, the Reverend Walter D. Slattery was assigned priest of Incarnation. In the following year, 1909, an additional priest, Reverend Alexander McCarthy, was appointed to the parish.

Father Mahoney, well aware that the neighborhood continued to grow rapidly, determined that a complete school should be built. It was designed by architect Thomas J. Duff. Archbishop John Murphy Farley laid the cornerstone for the new school on October 17, 1909, with Monsignor Michael J. Lavelle, Vicar General as preacher.

Father Mahoney relocated the chapel to the newly constructed school auditorium and on February 6, 1910, the first Mass in the new chapel was offered. Incarnation School opened on September 12, 1910, with two Sisters of Charity from Mount Saint Vincent, Sister M. Auxilium, Principal and Second Grade Teacher, and Sister Mercedes, First Grade Teacher, comprising its staff. The school enrolled 103 children in its first year of operation, but this number quickly grew, almost doubling by 1912. Attendant upon the opening of the school was the founding of the Saint Aloysius Society for Boys and the Angels Society for Girls under the direction of Sister Auxilium.

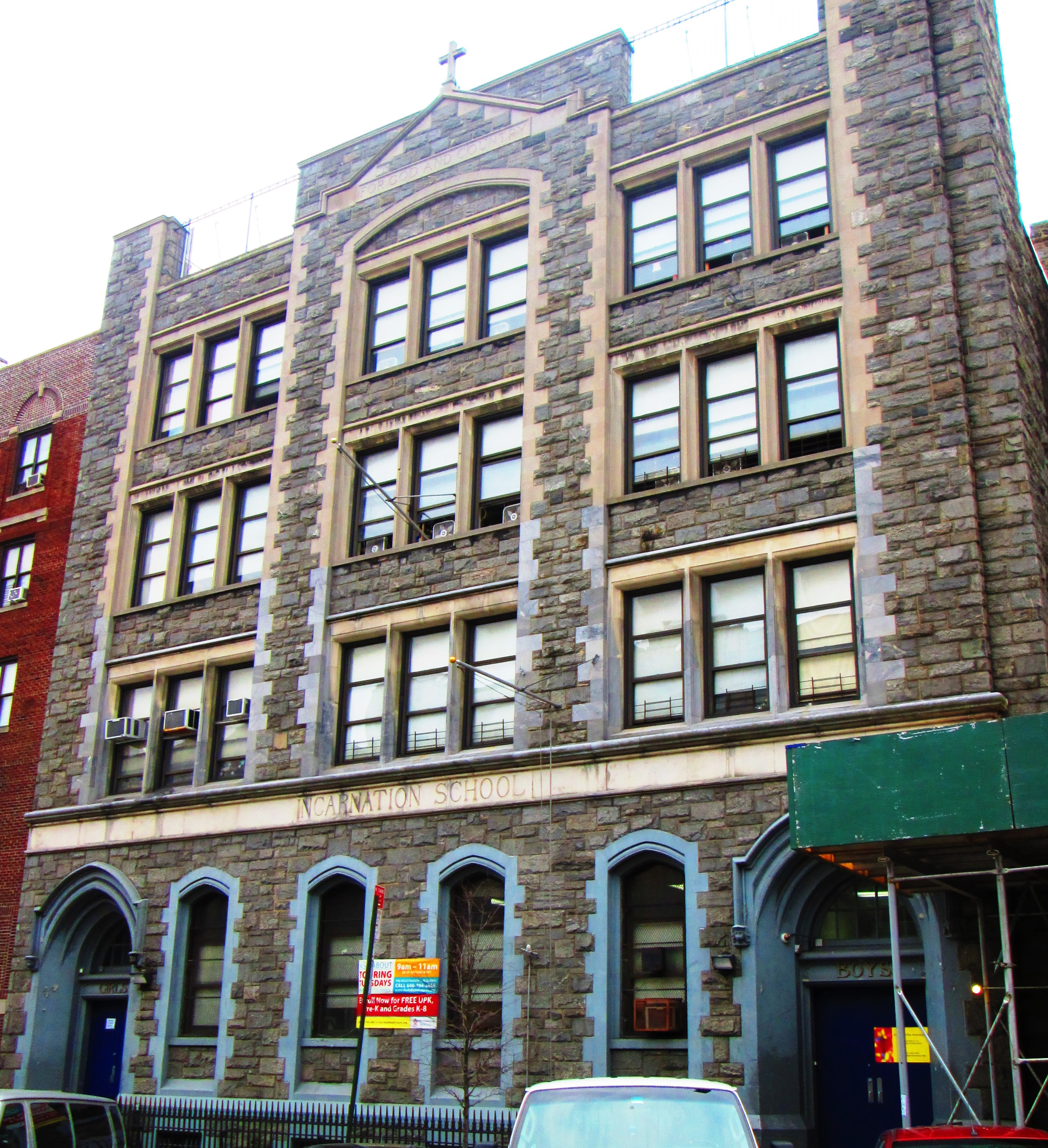
The school in 2014.

As enrollment rose, so did the associated challenge of providing a convent for the larger staff of teaching sisters that would soon be necessary. In the school's first years, the sisters lived at Saint Paul's Convent in Harlem and commuted to Washington Heights every day. However, on October 15, 1915, Incarnation alleviated the Sisters burden by establishing the school's first convent located at 515 West 173rd Street.

The first graduation exercise was held on June 29, 1916. The school had established a firm and enduring place in the Washington Heights community.

In 1918, Incarnation Parish eclipsed 3,000 parishioners. An ever-swelling student body resulted in the school adding two additional floors, which were completed in 1925.

As the school expanded to better serve the larger student body, the church, which had been holding Mass in the school auditorium since 1910, also began feeling the strain its parishioners were putting on the small auditorium. The parishioners recognized a need for increased space and a more dignified atmosphere for religious services. Under the guidance of Monsignor Delaney, funds were raised for a new church and on October 28, 1928, the corner stone for the new church was laid. The church was opened and dedicated by Patrick Cardinal Hayes on June 1, 1930.

By 1937, the parish had over 10,000 parishioners, 7,000 more than twenty years before. Three-quarters were of Irish ancestry.

Approximately 1,400 students attended the school in 1937. The additional two floors added to the building ten years prior was not enough to alleviate classroom overcrowding and the stress of teachers trying to educate classes crammed with students.

The school introduced a triple session thus allowing an 800 pupil school to accommodate 1,400 children. An increase in classes required a proportionate increase in staff and the old convent had already been over-crowded for some years. Monsignor Delaney knew that Incarnation must build again. He initiated a fundraising drive to realize the funds for a new convent. Property was purchased, construction began and the new convent was ready for occupancy in October 1940.

Hundreds of young men and women from Incarnation School served in World War II. The school participated in the war-time drives of collecting tin goods, fabric, and other items.

By 1945, 1,600 children were registered in the school. Monsignor Casey, in an effort to tackle the problems facing adolescent boys, invited the Christian Brothers to instruct the boys in the school's upper grades. To house the Brothers, Monsignor Casey became a builder like his predecessors. He acquired two houses on 173rd Street and united them into one residence. The Brothers' visible and effective influence was exercised throughout the school day and well into the night with daily and wide-ranging athletic programs.

With the addition of the Brothers, Casey never relegated to Sisters any position of lesser importance. Casey was appointed by the cardinal as Assistant Vicar for Religious.

Always a neighborhood of immigrants, the postwar years saw an increase of Spanish-speaking parishioners from Puerto Rico. Economic and political factors led to an influx of Cubans, Dominicans and families from Central and South America as well.

Monsignor Waterson accepted the challenge to integrate the newest residents into parish activities and encouraged families to enroll their children into the school.

In the 1970s, the school returned to single session. Incarnation experienced an increase in the number of dedicated lay teachers as the Christian Brothers departed.

During the 1980s, Sister Maureen Dunn, S.C., was leader. School enrollment hovered around 630 students and there were 19 full-time academic classroom teachers. Incarnation offered gym, art and music classes for each grade and students took advantage of a full-time guidance program.

Students participated in many diverse extracurricular activities, including yearbook, newspaper, Altar Boy Society, choral group, cheerleading, spelling bee, foreign mission activities, a school service program, art contest, talent show, author's day, and the production of an instructional television program.

The school also offered a sports program under the direction of future principal Ted Staniecki. Students in the 3rd through 8th grades participated in intramural basketball, boys and girls junior and varsity basketball teams, track competitions and baseball teams.

In 1996, the school took forty 7th and 8th grade students to Fukuoka, Japan for a ten-day educational excursion, repeated in 1998 and 2002.

Incarnation expanded its technological resources with Internet-based lessons, access to laptop computers, educational software, and wireless networking. A science lab was set up.

In 2026, the Archdiocese of New York announced the closure of Incarnation School as part of their school renewal process.

== Sports ==
- Basketball – Boys and girls may participate in the competitive Catholic Youth Organization basketball league beginning in fifth grade with the Tyros and Debs teams. Students in seventh and eighth grades may move on to the two varsity teams.
- Soccer – the school has a soccer program. Through COSA (Carlos Oliveira Soccer Academy), students in grades three through six participate weekly in basic soccer skills. The goal is to enter a team in the CYO sports league.
- Track – Students in third through eighth grades train twice a week at the National Track & Field Hall of Fame Armory Track. Track is organized through the Archdiocesan Citytrack program
- Sports Explorers Program – extracurricular opportunities for the younger grades.

== Notable alumni ==
- Vin Scully - baseball broadcaster
- Theodore McCarrick – cardinal and laicized bishop of the Catholic Church

== See also ==
- Church of the Incarnation
