= Ideas on the Nature of Science =

Book by David Cayley

- Cover of the first edition
- Editor: David Cayley
- Language: English
- Subjects: Science, Philosophy of science, History of science
- Publisher: Goose Lane Editions
- Publication date: Fall 2009
- Publication place: Canada
- Media type: Print (Paperback)
- Pages: 308
- ISBN: 978-0-86492-544-2
- OCLC: 406118604

Ideas on the Nature of Science is a book by Canadian author and radio producer David Cayley. It is a compilation of his conversations that took place during the CBC Radio series "How to Think About Science" for the program Ideas.
