= St. Lucy Church (Manhattan) =

Church in NY, United States

Coordinates: 40°47′18.73″N 73°56′30.69″W

St. Lucy's Church
- Parish Church of St. Lucy
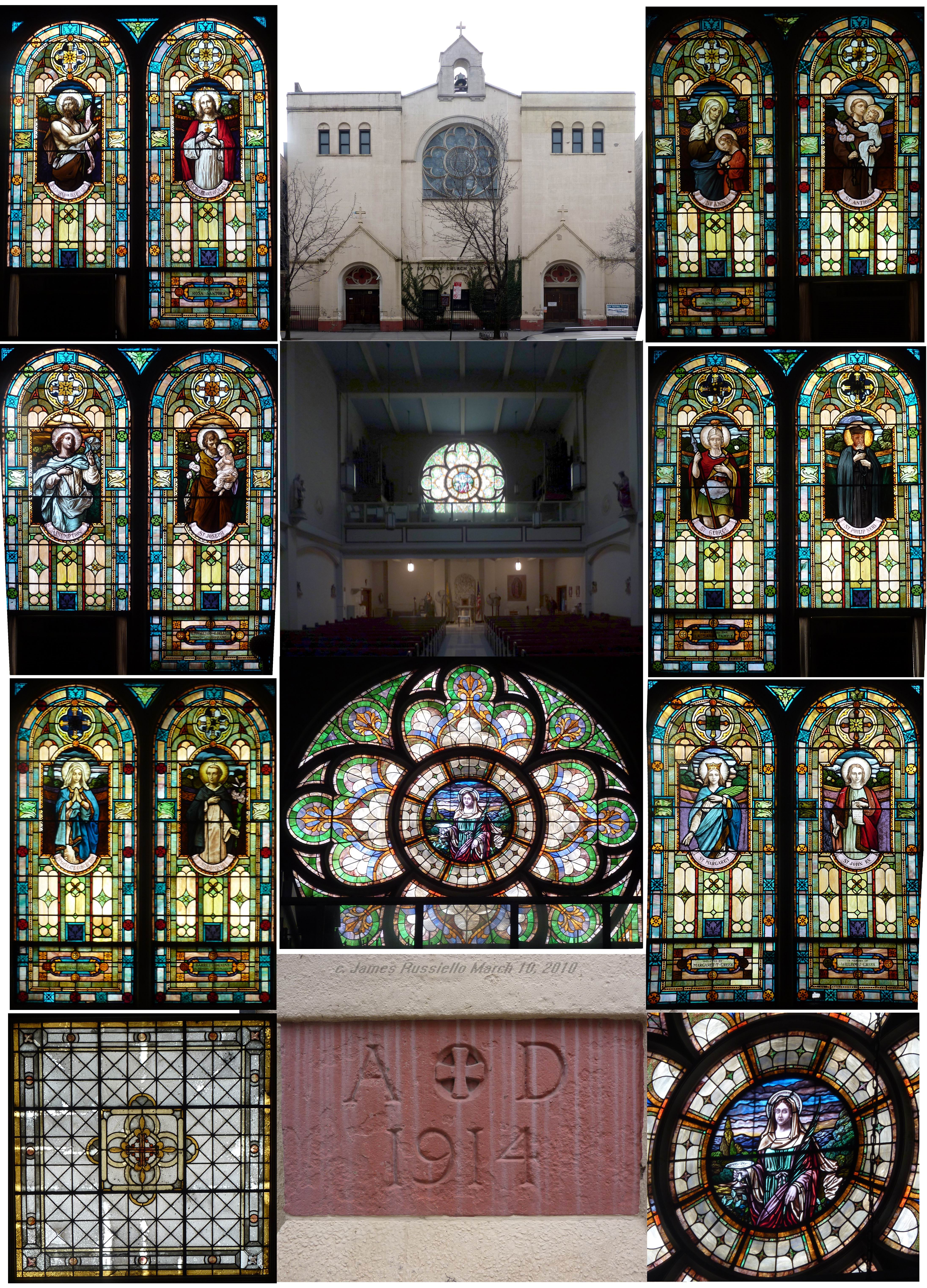
- Left column top to bottom: East aisle windows and one of two nave skylights; Center from top to bottom: Front (North) Elevation, Interior view from south to north rose window, Interior view of north rose window, and exterior view of front facade cornerstone dated 1914; Right column from top to bottom: West aisle windows and detail of rose window.
- St. Lucy's Church
- Location: 336-343 E 104th Street; New York, NY 10029
- Country: United States
- Denomination: Roman Catholic

History
- Status: parish church
- Founded: November 12, 1899
- Founder: Rev. Edmund W. Cronin
- Dedication: Saint Lucy
- Dedicated: November 7, 1915

Architecture
- Functional status: closed
- Architect(s): Lynch & Comb (basement church); Thomas J. Duff (upper church)
- Architectural type: church
- Style: Neo-Gothic
- Years built: 1900-1901 (basement church); 1914-1915 (upper church)
- Groundbreaking: 1900
- Completed: 1915
- Construction cost: $65,000
- Closed: July 31, 2015

Administration
- Archdiocese: Archdiocese of New York

St. Lucy's Church is a former parish church of the Parish of St. Lucy, which operated under the authority of the Archdiocese of New York in the East Harlem section of the Borough of Manhattan in New York City. The parish address was 344 East 104th Street; the parochial school occupied 336 East 104th Street. The parish merged with St. Ann's Church in 2015, and Masses and other sacraments are no longer offered regularly at this church.

The church was deconsecrated on June 30, 2017.

== First church ==
The parish was established on November 12, 1899, by Michael Corrigan, then Archbishop of New York, who appointed Edmund W. Cronin, a priest of the Archdiocese, to provide spiritual care for the Italian and English-speaking Catholics of the section of the city between East 97th and 110th Streets, from Second Avenue to the East River. To house the new congregation, Cronin rented a loft at 2008-2010 First Avenue, which he furnished as a chapel. It was there that the first Mass was celebrated on January 21, 1900. By the following June, the congregation was using a larger facility at 338 East 103rd Street.

The first permanent church was erected in 1901 to the designs of the architectural firm of Lynch & Comb (of 1133 Broadway) at a cost of $25,000. The unnamed structure was described as a "1-sty stone church, 80.8×96.11" and the address Nos 336 to 343 E 104th Street. In addition, Cronin commissioned the same architectural firm to build a four-story brick and stone rectory at 344 East 104th Street for $12,000.

Ground was broken for the rectory on June 6, 1900, and the structure was completed by Christmas that year. A basement church was solemnly dedicated by Corrigan on May 26, 1901, which was celebrated that year as Pentecost Sunday. The parish population at that point was around 5,000 to 6,000, half of whom were Italian. By 1914, the membership had risen to over 15,000 parishioners, of whom only 500 could speak English. The majority were now Italian. Active societies that year included senior and junior sections of Holy Name Societies, Children of Mary, as well as Rosary Society, Angel's Sodality, League of the Sacred Heart and the Eucharist League. The decision was made to build a full church over the original structure.

== Present church ==
Despite the pastors of the parish being of Irish descent, as well as some lingering parishioners, the parish quickly reflected the neighboring Italian American community and the new church was planned reflecting this demographic change.

The current St. Lucy's Church was built between 1914 and 1915 over the basement church to designs by the architectural firm of Thomas J. Duff (of 407 West 14th Street) and included a school. The structure was described in the planning application (1914) as a "three-story brick church and settlement house, 80×96 ft," and the structure was planned to cost $40,000. Patrick J. Lennon succeed Cronin as rector in May 1911, and the cornerstone was dated to 1914.

The completed church was dedicated on November 7, 1915, by the succeeding archbishop, Cardinal John Farley, with Archbishop Giovanni Bonzano, P.I.M.E., the Apostolic Delegate of the Holy See to the United States, presiding. The school, which was administered by the Pallotine Sisters until 1979, was "regarded by the Fire Department as a model in fire exit accommodations," with every classroom having three exits.

== Description ==
The midblock double-height Neo-Gothic church has a rendered symmetrical facade of three bays, a splayed plinth and a molded stringcourse running above between the first and (heightened) second floors. The central bay has a depressed gable surmounted by an open bellcote with cast-bronze bell; the second story has a prominent quatrefoil rose window surmounted by a stop-ended hood mold over the first floor with three square-headed windows in round-headed recesses. Flanking bays both slightly project with square-headed parapet roofs, while both second floors have three square-headed windows in round-headed recesses over gabled breakfront entrance porches. Both porch entrances are square-headed double varnished timber paneled doors set within a deep round-headed opening with quatrefoil and mouchette tympanums.

== Closing ==
In the mid-20th century, the ethnic makeup of the neighborhood began to change dramatically, with the Italian population beginning to be replaced by the Puerto Rican community. By the time of the centennial celebration of the founding of the parish in 1999, membership had dropped to 300 parishioners.

In June 2014, the Archdiocese of New York announced a major re-structuring of its parishes. The following November, the Parish of St. Lucy was one of many parishes officially designated to be merged with a neighboring parish and the church closed. The former parish and its property were merged with the Parish of St. Ann to form the new Parish of St. Ann and St. Lucy.

== Pastors ==
- 1899-1911: Rev. Edmund W. Cronin, who was born in New York City on 9 August 1863, educated at St. Francis Xavier's College, the North American College, Rome, and ordained in Rome on June 4, 1887, by Cardinal Parocchi. Rev. John L. Kenney was assigned here (presumably as assistant) in 1904. Attending to the Italian parishioners in 1904, the Reverends Marcucci and DeVivo switched assignments between here and St. Patrick's Cathedral, with Marcucci leaving St. Lucy's. The same year, the Reverend Nationio Cattogio transferred to this parish from Immaculate Conception Parish.
- 1911-?: Rev. Patrick J. Lennon
- ?-1998: Rev. Esviardo Palomino
- 1988-2003: Rev. Rober Lott
- 2003-2015: Msgr. Rev. Oscar A. Aquino, J.C.D.
