= Church of the Incarnation, Roman Catholic (Manhattan) =

Catholic parish church in New York City

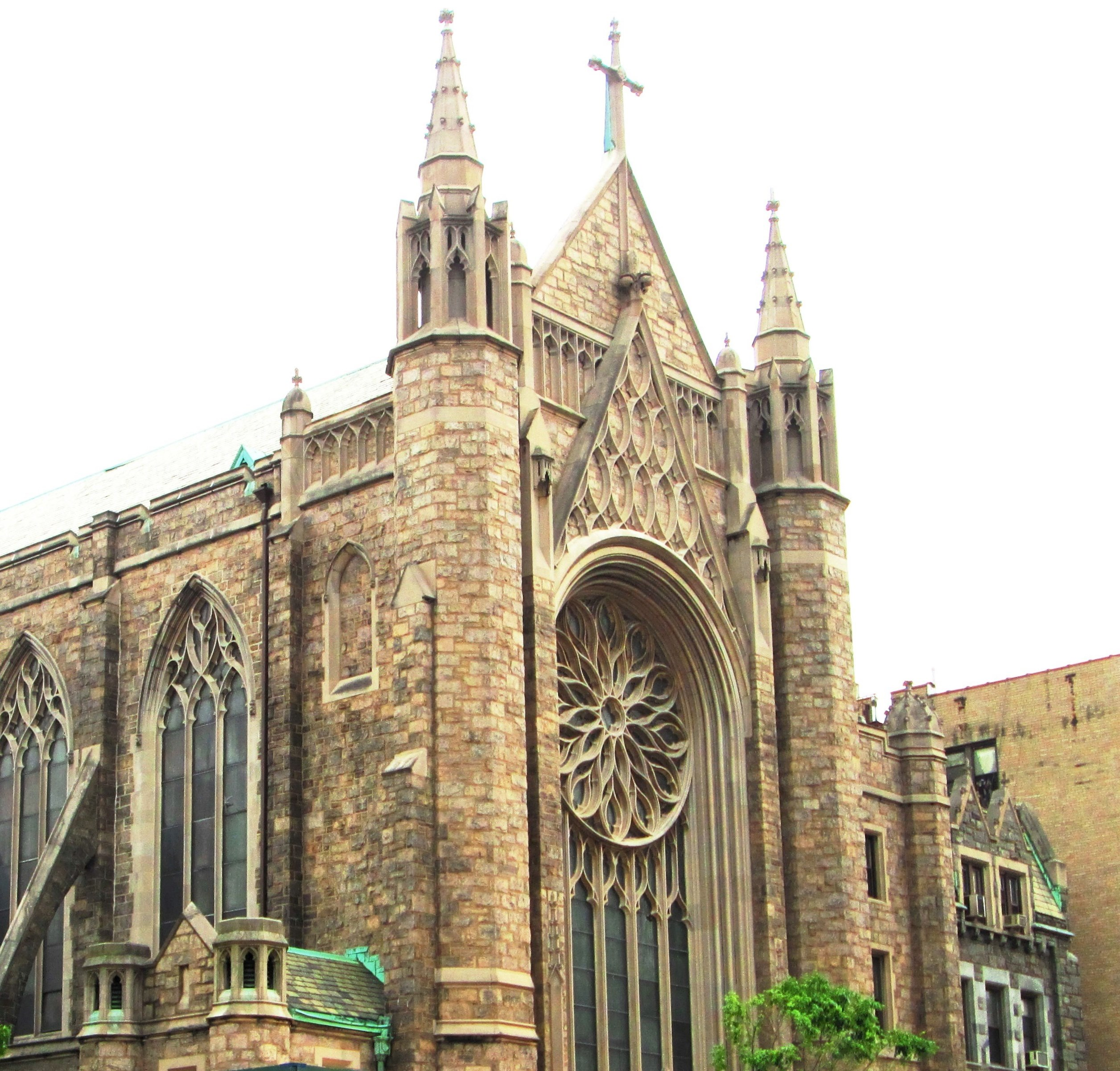
- (2014)
- Interactive map of the Church of the Incarnation, Roman Catholic area

General information
- Architectural style: Gothic Revival
- Location: 1290 St. Nicholas Avenue, Washington Heights, Manhattan, New York City, New York, United States
- Coordinates: 40°50′43″N 73°56′11″W
- Construction started: 1908 (118 years ago) – for first church/school; 1928 (98 years ago) – for present church
- Completed: 1910 (116 years ago) – for first church school; c. 1913 – for rectory
- Client: Archdiocese of New York

Technical details
- Structural system: Masonry stone with limestone trim

Design and construction
- Architect: W. H. Jones (for 1928 church)

Website
- incarnationnyc.com

The Church of the Incarnation is a Catholic parish church in the Archdiocese of New York, located at 1290 St. Nicholas Avenue (Juan Pablo Duarte Boulevard) at the corner with 175th Street in the Washington Heights neighborhood of Manhattan in New York City. The church is known as "the St. Patrick's Cathedral of Washington Heights".

== History ==
The parish "was founded in 1908 by the Rev. P. J. Mahoney, D.D.", the parish's first pastor, formed in response to "…the rapid growth of the city along the Hudson River above 145th Street…". Mass was said in a store until the erection in 1910 of a two-story building, which serves as a school and church. Ground for a church adjoins the school building on the corner of 175th and St. Nicholas Avenue". In 1914, the Mahoney was still pastor and was assisted by Francis A. Kiniry and Joseph V. Stanford, the three of whom occupied a recently completed "handsome three-story rectory".

Soon after his arrival in the United States in 1951, Ivan Illich was made an assistant priest of the parish. He preached under the name of John Illich, at the suggestion of the Parish's pastor, who claimed that the name Ivan "sounded communist". At Incarnation, Illich rose to prominence as an ally of the large Puerto Rican community in Washington Heights, organizing cultural outlets for them, such as the San Juan Fiesta, a celebration of Puerto Rico and its patron saint which eventually evolved into the still-extant Puerto Rican Day Parade. The success of Illich attracted the attention of the Archbishop of New York, Cardinal Spellman, eventually resulting in Illich's naming as vice-rector of the Catholic University of Puerto Rico in 1956.

The current pastor is Edward Russell.

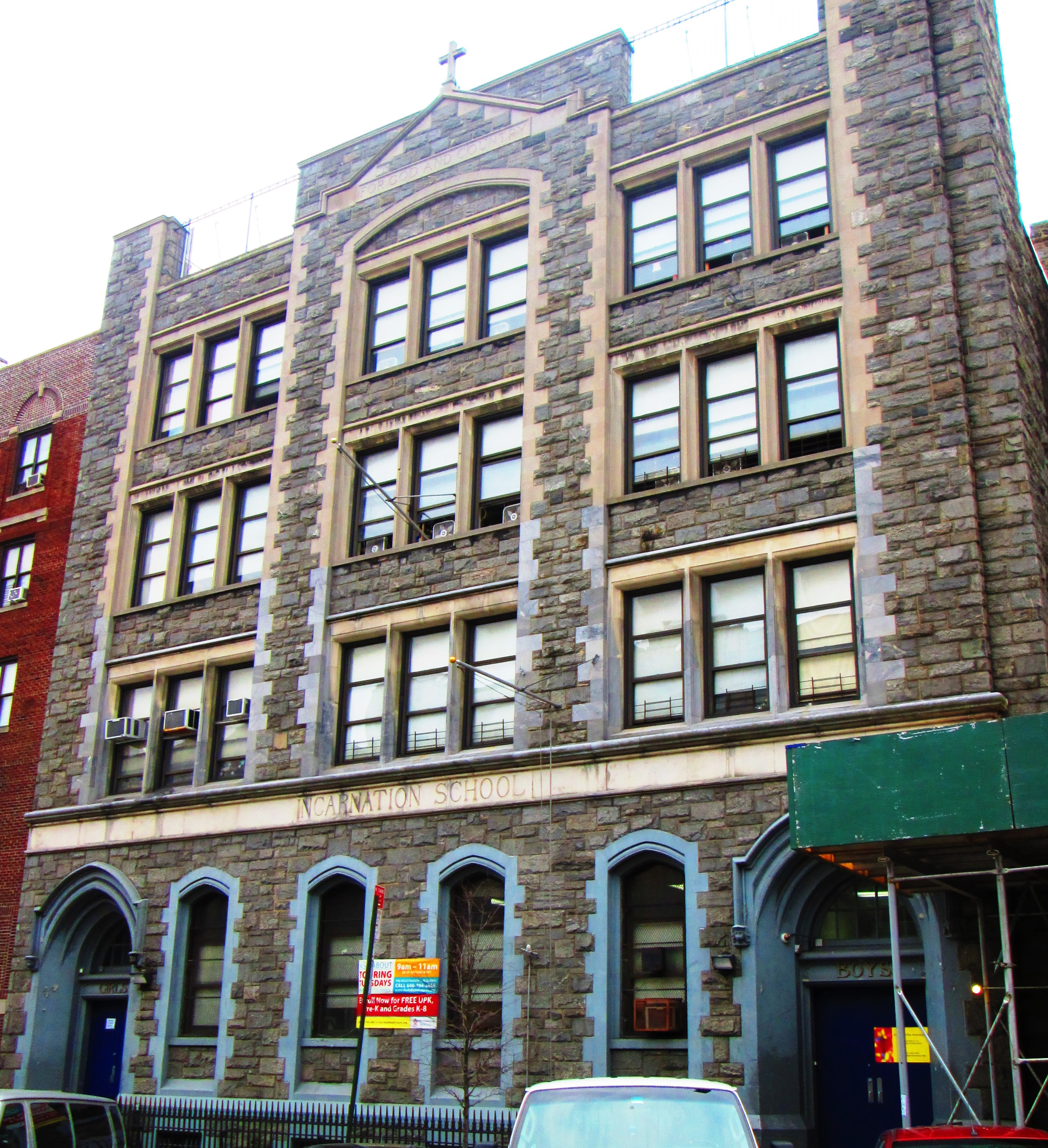
The Incarnation School at 570 West 175th Street, just east of the church

== Building ==
The present Gothic Revival stone buttressed-church with apse was built in 1928 to the designs of W. H. Jones with two small towers.

Internally, the contemporary-with-the-building baldacchino is of white marble and lit by rich stained-glass windows. "At the West End is a large and stunning rose window above the gallery. Twin organ facades with gold pipes face into the gallery from both sides, and additional organ facades are found in the North transept and in the apse".

== Incarnation School ==
The Incarnation School is located at 570 West 175th Street. In 1914, the school which had been built with the church and completed in 1910 was in the charge of two Sisters of Charity of New York and two lay teachers, who oversaw 125 pupils. It was formerly staffed by the De La Salle Christian Brothers.

Among the school's notable graduates have been baseball broadcaster Vin Scully and Theodore E. McCarrick.
