= St. Malachy Roman Catholic Church =

Church building in Manhattan, New York

The Church of St. Malachy (The Actors' Chapel)
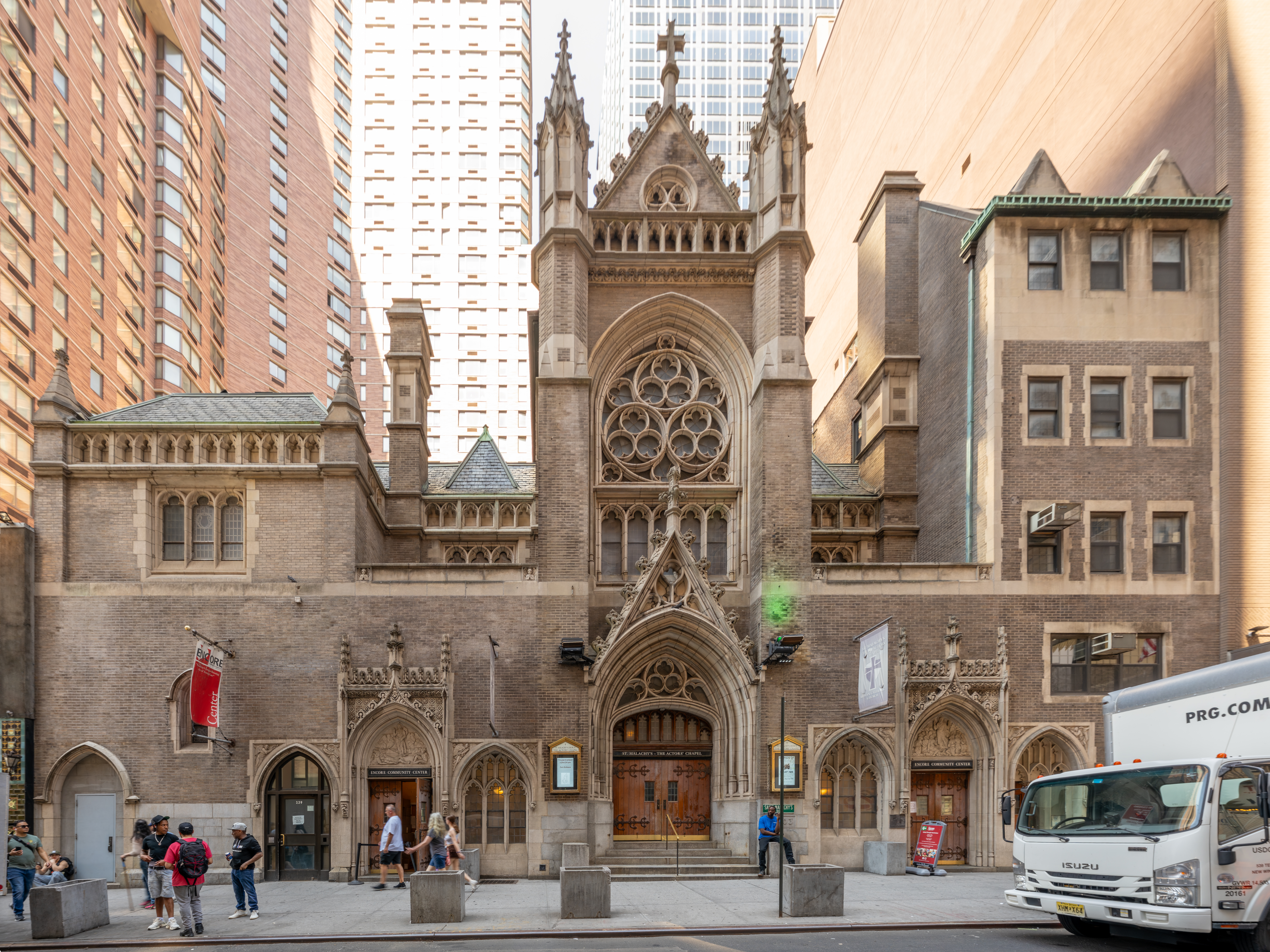
- Interactive map of the The Church of St. Malachy (The Actors' Chapel) area

General information
- Architectural style: Gothic Revival
- Location: 239 W 49th St, New York, NY 10019, USA
- Coordinates: 40°45′41″N 73°59′08″W
- Construction started: 1910
- Completed: 1920
- Client: Roman Catholic Archdiocese of New York

Design and construction
- Architects: Joseph Hubert McGuire, Thomas J. Duff, Robert J. Reiley

Website
- actorschapel.org

St. Malachy Roman Catholic Church is a parish church of the Roman Catholic Archdiocese of New York, located in Manhattan on West 49th Street, between Broadway and Eighth Avenue. The parish has served the theatre community in a special way since 1920, and its parishioners have included many actors, such as Bob Hope and Gregory Peck.

== Founding ==
Due to an influx of Irish immigrants to the nearby Hell's Kitchen neighborhood, Sacred Heart Church was unable to accommodate the need and a second parish was established. St. Malachy's was founded in 1902 by Archbishop Farley, with William Daly named as the first pastor. Services were soon being held in a basement sanctuary. The church was designed by prolific ecclesiastical architect, Joseph Hubert McGuire, and built the following year.

== The Actors' Parish ==
Around 1920 the Theater District started to move uptown into this area, and actors, dancers, and musicians became prominent worshipers at the church, replacing the traditional, working class congregants. To answer their needs, the pastor, Monsignor Edward F. Leonard, had the Chapel of St. Genesius, the patron saint of actors – commonly called the "Actors' Chapel" – constructed below the main church in 1920. It was designed by architect Thomas J. Duff.

Leonard sought the special permission of the Archbishop of New York for Masses to be celebrated there at 4 A.M. (which was banned by canon law at the time) to accommodate the non-standard schedules of theater workers and thus make worship convenient for them.

St. Malachy soon became a primary place of worship for the entertainment community. It gained worldwide attention when the church hosted the funeral of Rudolph Valentino and then the wedding of Douglas Fairbanks Jr. to Joan Crawford. Celebrity worshipers were often in attendance, as well as theater goers, and the nearby location of Madison Square Garden during that time helped to provide a steady stream of visitors. Robert J. Reiley designed an additional wing on the west side of the church in 1930. A young Paul Creston launched his professional career while serving as an organist at St. Malachy's from 1934 until 1967. Until the late 1960s average monthly attendance at Sunday services totaled some 16,000 people. The church's chimes would play "There's No Business Like Show Business." "It is a Broadway tradition to light a candle at the Actors' Chapel for the success of a show on opening night."

== Changing neighborhoods ==
By 1968, the neighborhood was undergoing a drastic change as the theatre community started to move out and the area became home to a community plagued by poverty and drugs. Madison Square Garden moved away. Most who stayed were elderly and poor. Many were held virtually under siege in decaying single room occupancy hotels or in tenements with a tub in the kitchen and a shared bathroom in the hallway.

Thomas J. O'Brien was brought from a parish in the South Bronx to help deal with the new realities of the neighborhood. He was succeeded by George W. Moore in 1976, who created a new model of pastoral outreach. Under his pastorate, the church "expanded its mission to the elderly, poor, homeless, and home-bound." In 1991, after 25 years as pastor, Moore was awarded a Tony Honors for Excellence in Theatre for his service to the elderly of the theater district. He received it shortly before his death from cancer.

== List of pastors ==
- William G. B. Daly (1902–1906)
- Joseph Francis Delany (1906–1917)
- Lawrence E. Murray III (1917–1920)
- Edward F. Leonard (1920–1937)
- James B. O'Reilly (1941–1960)
- Thomas J. O'Brien (1966–1976)
- George W. Moore (1976–1991)
- Michael C. Crimmins (1991–2001)
- Erno Diaz (2001–2003)
- Richard D. Baker (2003–2015)
- Peter M. Colapietro (2015–2018)
- John Fraser (2018–present), parish administrator

== Notable ceremonies ==
- Douglas Fairbanks, Jr., married Joan Crawford
- Walter O'Malley married Katherine Hanson
- Rudolph Valentino's funeral
- Tennessee Williams' funeral
- Bunny Berigan's funeral

== Noted attendees ==
- Fred Allen
- Don Ameche
- George M. Cohan
- Perry Como
- Paul Creston, who was a parishioner and served as organist (1934-1967)
- Irene Dunne
- Jimmy Durante, who grew up as a parishioner and served as altar boy there
- Chris Farley
- Alec Guinness
- Florence Henderson.
- Hildegarde
- Bob Hope
- Ricardo Montalbán
- Pat O'Brien
- Carroll O'Connor
- Gregory Peck
- Cyril Ritchard
- Rosalind Russell
- Elaine Stritch
- Danny Thomas
- Spencer Tracy
