= Bruce Charlton =

British doctor

Bruce Graham Charlton is a retired British medical doctor who was visiting professor of Theoretical Medicine at the University of Buckingham. Until April 2019, he was Reader in Evolutionary Psychiatry at Newcastle University. Charlton was editor of the controversial and not-conventionally-peer reviewed journal Medical Hypotheses from 2003 to 2010.

== Biography ==
Charlton graduated with honours from the Newcastle Medical School in Newcastle upon Tyne, took a doctorate at the Medical Research Council Neuroendocrinology group, and did postgraduate training in psychiatry and public health. He has held university lectureships in physiology, anatomy, epidemiology, and psychology; and holds a master's degree in English literature from Durham University in North East England. His thesis, a study of the work of Alasdair Gray, was completed in 1989.

From 2003 to 2010, Charlton was the solo-editor of the journal Medical Hypotheses, published by Elsevier. In 2009 HIV/AIDS denier Peter Duesberg published a paper in Medical Hypothesis falsely arguing that “there is as yet no proof that HIV causes AIDS", leading to protests from scientists for the journal's lack of peer review. The paper was withdrawn from the journal citing concerns over the paper's quality and “that [it] could potentially be damaging to global public health.” Elsevier consequently revamped the journal to introduce conventional peer review, firing Charlton from his position as editor, due to his resistance to these changes. In October 2012, 198 researchers signed a paper in Theoretical Medicine and Bioethics criticizing the changes made by Elsevier.

== Publications ==
Charlton has published a number of books, and maintains various blogs.

- with RS Downie, The making of a doctor: medical education in theory and practice (1993)
- Psychiatry and the Human Condition (2000; online copy)
- with Peter Andras, The Modernization Imperative (2003; online copy)
- Thought Prison: the fundamental nature of political correctness (2011; online copy)
- Not even trying: the corruption of real science (2012; online copy)
- Addicted to Distraction: Psychological consequences of the modern Mass Media (2014; online copy)
- with Edward Dutton, The Genius Famine: why we need geniuses, why they're dying out, and why we must rescue them (2016; online copy)

== See also ==
- Evolutionary psychiatry
- Evolutionary medicine
- Bryan Caplan
- Steve Sailer
- David Pearce
