= Thomas J. Duff =

Ecclesiastical architect

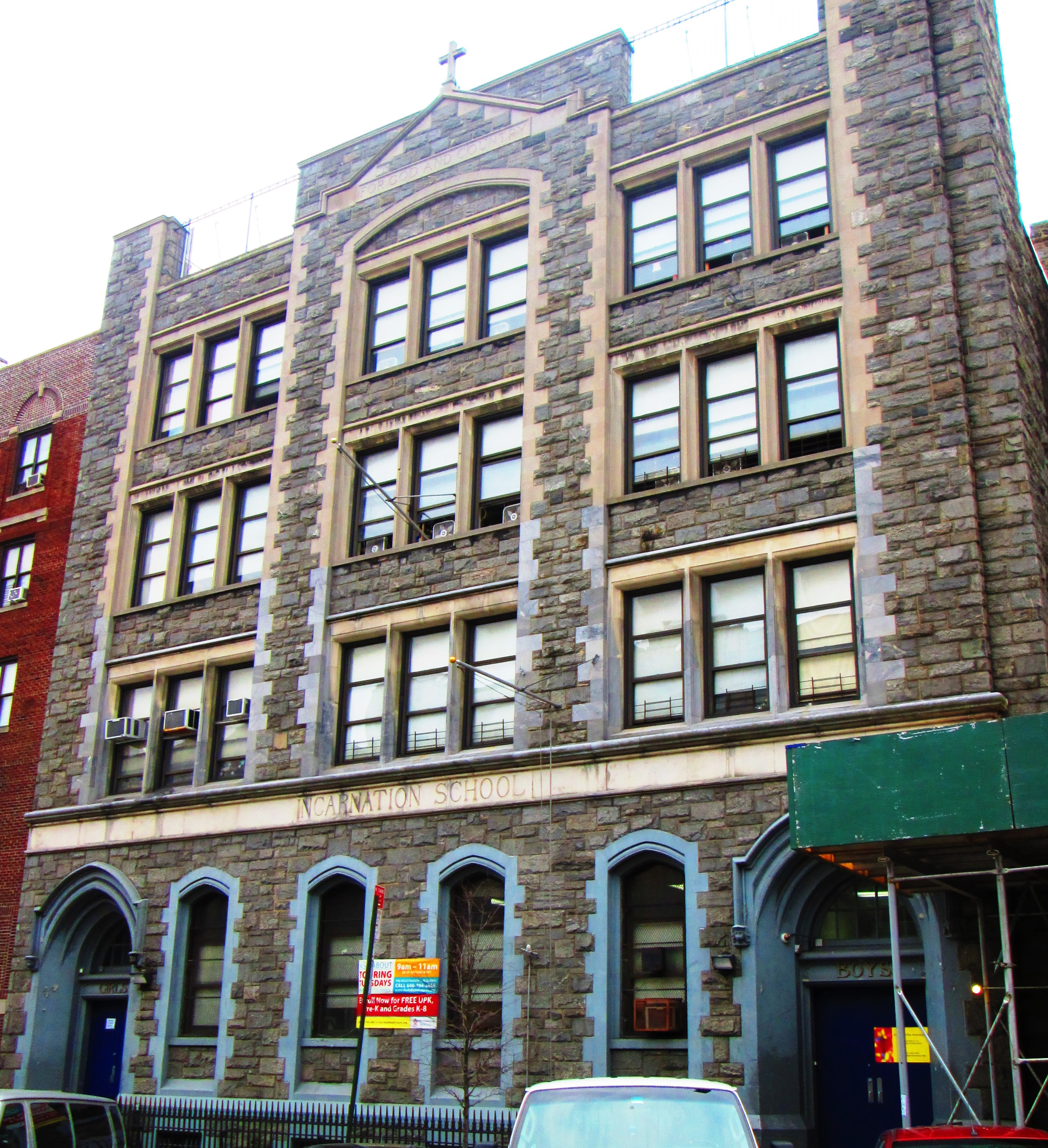
Incarnation School 570 West 175th Street

Thomas J. Duff was an architect noted for his design of a number of religious buildings for the Roman Catholic Archdiocese of New York during its major expansion at the beginning of the 20th century.

His firm was headquartered first at the Metropolitan Building, 1 Madison Avenue, and later at 407 West 14th Street, Manhattan, and in Mount Vernon in Westchester County. Duff was a member of the Architectural League of New York.

== Buildings designed by Duff ==
- The West Side Bank (1906)
- St. Brendan's Church, Williamsbridge (1906).
- Immaculate Conception Church (1908) in Tuckahoe
- St. Francis Friary, Manhattan (1909)
- Incarnation School (Manhattan) (1909).
- St. Lucy's Church (1914–15) on East 104th Street in Manhattan.
- Saint Malachy's Roman Catholic Church on West 49th Street in Manhattan, Chapel of Saint Genesius (patron saint of actors) 1920.
- Rectory of St. Cecilia Parish (1927) at 125 East 106th Street in Manhattan.
