= David Cayley =

Canadian writer and broadcaster (1946–2026)

- Born: 1946; Toronto, Ontario, Canada
- Died: June 10, 2026 (aged 80); Toronto, Ontario, Canada
- Occupations: Writer, broadcaster
- Website: Official website

David Cayley (1946 – June 10, 2026) was a Canadian writer and broadcaster based in Toronto. He is known for documenting philosophy of prominent thinkers of the 20th century – Ivan Illich, Northrop Frye, George Grant, and René Girard.

His work has been broadcast on CBC Radio One's programme Ideas.

Cayley died on June 10, 2026, at the age of 80.

== List of works ==
- Cayley, David. 2025. The CBC: how Canada’s public broadcaster lost its voice (and how to get it back) (2025) ISBN 978-1-998365-54-8 Toronto: Sutherland House, 2025
- Ivan Illich: An Intellectual Journey (2021) ISBN 978-0-271-08812-9 (Pennsylvania: Penn State University Press)
- Ideas on the Nature of Science (2009) ISBN 978-0-86492-544-2 (Toronto: Goose Lane Editions)
- The Rivers North of the Future: The Testament of Ivan Illich (2005) ISBN 0-88784-714-5 (Toronto: Anansi Press)
- Puppet Uprising (2003) ISBN 0-660-19006-0 (Toronto: CBC Radio Canada)
- Corruption of Christianity Illich, Ivan (Author) Cayley, David (Editor) (2000) ISBN 0-660-18099-5 (Toronto: Anansi Press)
- Northrop Frye in Conversation interviews with Northrop Frye (2000) ISBN 0-88784-525-8 (Toronto: Anansi Press)
- Expanding Prison (1998) ISBN 0-88784-603-3 (Toronto: Anansi Press)
- George Grant in Conversation interviews with George Grant (1995) ISBN 0-88784-553-3 (Toronto: Anansi Press)
- Ivan Illich in Conversation interviews with Ivan Illich (1992) ISBN 0-88784-524-X (Toronto: Anansi Press)

== Ideas on the Nature of Science ==
Edited transcripts from the radio series have been turned into a book, published in 2009 by Gooselane Press as Ideas on the Nature of Science.

=== How To Think About Science episodes ===
Episode	Guests
Episode 1	Simon Schaffer
Episode 2	Lorraine Daston
Episode 3	Margaret Lock
Episode 4	Ian Hacking and Andrew Pickering
Episode 5	Ulrich Beck and Bruno Latour
Episode 6	James Lovelock
Episode 7	Arthur Zajonc
Episode 8	Wendell Berry
Episode 9	Rupert Sheldrake
Episode 10	Brian Wynne
Episode 11	Sajay Samuel
Episode 12	David Abram
Episode 13	Dean Bavington
Episode 14	Evelyn Fox Keller
Episode 15	Barbara Duden and Silya Samerski
Episode 16	Steven Shapin
Episode 17	Peter Galison
Episode 18	Richard Lewontin
Episode 19	Ruth Hubbard
Episode 20	Michael Gibbons, Peter Scott and Janet Atkinson Grosjean
Episode 21	Christopher Norris and Mary Midgely
Episode 22	Allan Young
Episode 23	Lee Smolin
Episode 24	Nicholas Maxwell
