= Medical Hypotheses =

Unconventional academic journal (1975-)

- Discipline: Medical theory
- Language: English
- Edited by: Mehar Manku

Publication details
- History: 1975–present
- Publisher: Elsevier
- Frequency: Monthly
- Impact factor: 2.1 (2023)

Standard abbreviations
- ISO 4: Med. Hypotheses

Indexing
- CODEN: MEHYDY
- ISSN: 0306-9877 (print); 1532-2777 (web)
- LCCN: 80641888
- OCLC no.: 01357097

Links
- Journal homepage; Online archive

Medical Hypotheses is a not-conventionally-peer-reviewed medical journal published by Elsevier. It was originally intended as a forum for unconventional ideas without the traditional filter of scientific peer review, "as long as (the ideas) are coherent and clearly expressed" in order to "foster the diversity and debate upon which the scientific process thrives." The publication of papers on AIDS denialism led to calls to remove it from PubMed, the United States National Library of Medicine online journal database. Following the AIDS papers controversy, Elsevier forced a change in the journal's leadership. In June 2010, Elsevier announced that "submitted manuscripts will be reviewed by the Editor and external reviewers to ensure their scientific merit".

According to the Journal Citation Reports, the journal has a 2023 impact factor of 2.1.

== Founding and editorship ==
Medical Hypotheses was founded in 1975 by physiologist David Horrobin, who was the editor-in-chief of the journal until his death in 2003 as well as the head of the Schizophrenia Association in Britain. Horrobin was a controversial figure, a scientist and entrepreneur best known for his promotion of evening primrose oil as a treatment for diseases, leading the British Medical Journal (BMJ) to predict that he "may prove to be the greatest snake oil salesman of his age." Horrobin wrote in his inaugural editorial for Medical Hypotheses: "The history of science has repeatedly shown that when hypotheses are proposed it is impossible to predict which will turn out to be revolutionary and which ridiculous. The only safe approach is to let all see the light and to let all be discussed, experimented upon, vindicated or destroyed. I hope the journal will provide a new battlefield open to all on which ideas can be tested and put through the fire." In its first edition, Medical Hypotheses published articles from its editorial review board member, virologist Frank Macfarlane Burnet, in vitro fertilization pioneer Ian Johnston, Gerald Kolodny of Beth Israel Medical Center, and Tom Tenforde, later chief scientist of the United States Department of Energy.

After Horrobin's death, Bruce G. Charlton, a professor of evolutionary psychology at the University of Newcastle upon Tyne and theoretical medicine at the University of Buckingham, became the editor, making publication decisions with the informal assistance of an advisory board. Horrobin had described Charlton as "the only person I really trust to take it over and run it in an open-minded fashion". Notable members of the advisory board included behavioral neurologist António Damásio, cognitive neuroscientist Vilayanur S. Ramachandran, surgical pioneer Roy Calne, psychiatrist David Healy, philosopher David Pearce, and the Nobel laureate Arvid Carlsson. Mehar Manku became the editor of Medical Hypotheses after Charlton was fired in 2010.

Medical Hypotheses was initially published by Eden Press. Elsevier has been its publisher since 2002.

== Abstracting and indexing ==
The journal is abstracted and indexed in the Science Citation Index, Index Medicus, BIOSIS Previews, Chemical Abstracts, Elsevier BIOBASE/Current Awareness in Biological Sciences, Current Contents/Clinical Medicine, Current Contents/Life Sciences, and EMBASE/Excerpta Medica. It was delisted from Medline in January 2022.

== Research ==
The most widely cited article from Medical Hypotheses was published in 1991 by Ronald S. Smith in which he proposed the macrophage theory of depression as an alternative to the monoamine theory of depression. Other famous articles featured in the journal include the proposal from Jarl Flensmark of Malmö, Sweden, that schizophrenia may be caused by wearing heeled shoes, and an article from Svetlana Komarova of McGill University positing that facial hair may play a role in preventing the development of cancer.

In what psychiatrist and The Guardian columnist Ben Goldacre called an "almost surreally crass paper", two Medical Hypotheses authors posited "mongoloid" as an accurate term for people with Down syndrome because those with Down syndrome share characteristics with people of Asian origin, including a reported interest in crafts, sitting with crossed legs and eating foods containing monosodium glutamate (MSG). Correspondence items have presented masturbation as a treatment for nasal congestion. Science reported that a 2009 paper by Georg Steinhauser on navel lint "became an instant classic".

In 2007, journalist Roger Dobson published a book in which he collected and described 100 Medical Hypotheses articles called Death Can Be Cured.

== Peer review debate ==
Horrobin began the journal in response to what he viewed as the limitations of peer review. He wrote, "The primary criteria for acceptance are very different from the usual journals. In essence what I look for are answers to two questions only: Is there some biological plausibility to what the author is saying? Is the paper readable? We are NOT looking at whether or not the paper is true but merely at whether it is interesting." According to physiologist John Stein, Horrobin believed from his days as an undergraduate that peer review encourages adherence to currently accepted ideas at the expense of innovation. Also neuroscientist Vilayanur Ramachandran, who is on the journal's editorial review board, told Science: "There are ideas that may seem implausible but which are very important if true. This is the only place you can get them published."

At October 2012, an international campaign involving 198 scientists published a critical article defending Bruce Charlton and the idea of editorial review.

=== AIDS denialism papers and fallout ===
In 2009, the journal's publisher, Elsevier, withdrew two articles written by AIDS denialists that had been accepted for publication. One of the withdrawn articles, written by Peter Duesberg and David Rasnick, claimed that there is "yet no proof that HIV causes AIDS" and was not responsible for deaths in South Africa that another paper had attributed to it and misrepresented the results of medical research on antiretroviral drugs. This paper had originally been submitted to the Journal of Acquired Immune Deficiency Syndromes (JAIDS), but it was rejected after peer review. One of the editors of JAIDS later cited problems with the paper, alleging that it had contained cherry-picking and other dishonest claims. The publisher stated that the articles "could potentially be damaging to global public health. Concern has also been expressed that the article contains potentially libelous material. Given these important signals of concern, we judge it correct to investigate the circumstances in which this article came to be published online."

The withdrawal followed a campaign by scientists who criticised the articles' factual accuracy and the process behind their acceptance. A group of 20 HIV scientists and advocates contacted the National Library of Medicine to request that the journal be removed from the MEDLINE database alleging that the journal lacked scientific rigor and had become a "tool for the legitimization of at least one pseudoscientific movement: AIDS denialism." Economist Nicoli Nattrass wrote in an article in AIDS and Behavior that "Medical Hypotheses has long been a source of concern in the scientific community because the articles are not peer-reviewed," and that the National Library of Medicine had been requested to review the journal "for de-selection from PubMed on the grounds that it was not peer-reviewed and had a disturbing track record of publishing pseudo-science." Nattrass later wrote that as a result of the controversy, Science reported that Elsevier had asked that the journal's editor either raise the standards of review or resign. A review panel convened by Elsevier recommended that Medical Hypotheses adopt some form of peer review to avoid publication of "baseless, speculative, non-testable and potentially harmful ideas". Editor Bruce Charlton said that peer review went against the journal's 30-year history and is not supported by either him or the journal's editorial board. Elsevier reportedly told Charlton that his position would not be renewed at the end of the year, and Charlton said he would not resign. On 11 May 2010 Bruce Charlton announced on his blog that he "was sacked" by Elsevier.

Of the journal's 19 editorial board members, 13 wrote to Elsevier in protest over the decision to change the journal's editorial policies. The group of scientists wrote that not having peer review "is an integral part of our identity, indeed our very raison d'être," and they would resign their positions if it was instituted. One of the members, David Healy of the University of Cardiff School of Medicine, said that the review board members' letter was "a defense of Bruce, not of the Duesberg paper." In contrast, board member António Damásio said that the paper should not have been published on the journal's website.

In June 2010, Elsevier announced the appointment of Mehar Manku as the new editor, and stated that "submitted manuscripts will be reviewed by the Editor and external reviewers to ensure their scientific merit. All reviewers will be fully aware of the Aims and Scope of the journal and will be judging the premise, originality and plausibility of the hypotheses submitted." Manku was previously the Editor of Prostaglandins, Leukotrienes and Essential Fatty Acids, another journal founded by Horrobin.
