= Radical monopoly =

Radical monopoly is a concept defined by philosopher and author Ivan Illich in his 1973 book, Tools for Conviviality, and revisited in his later work, which describes how a technology or service becomes so exceptionally dominant that even with multiple providers, its users are excluded from society without access to the product. His initial example is the effect of cars on societies, where the car itself shaped cities by its needs, so much so that people without cars become excluded from participation in cities. A radical monopoly is when the dominance of one type of product supersedes dominance by any one brand.

While the concept of "Radical Monopoly" has been referenced informally by "cultural studies bloggers and academics", an example of the concept getting more formal traction includes a paper published in the journal Problems of Education in the 21st century whose abstract describes an example whereby, "information and communication technologies might possess potentials to develop various radical monopolies, while education might be one of the main vehicles for such developments."

Illich extends the concept with examples from medicine and learning, where a radical monopoly on medicine deprives patients of care that isn't provided by doctors, and a radical monopoly on learning defines students whose knowledge is developed outside the classroom as "uneducated." He writes, "Radical monopoly exists where a major tool rules out natural competence."

In his later book Energy and Equity, Illich refines the definition to include, "Any industrial product that comes in per capita quanta beyond a given in-tensity exercises a radical monopoly over the satisfaction of a need. Beyond some point, compulsory schooling destroys the environment for learning, medical delivery systems dry up the non-therapeutic sources of health, and transportation smothers traffic."

The definitions require a kind of conceptual economic inversion, where instead of a producer monopolizing a market, it is the product itself that both produces and administers to its own need. An analogy for such an inversion in economics can be found in ideas like the Giffen Good and Veblen Good, where the factors that describe the demand characteristics of a good are logically inverted and yield a new type of good that was initially an artifact of the logical inversion, but has been found to apply to real world goods such as luxury items, investment bubbles, and status signalling. Illich's radical monopoly concept is distinct from a valuable good that becomes scarce because of demand for it, or anti-competitive behavior by the producer, rather it is defined "by virtue of its acquired ability to create and shape the need which it alone can satisfy."
