= Ivan Illich =

Austrian Catholic priest and philosopher (1926–2002)

The Reverend Monsignor Ivan Illich
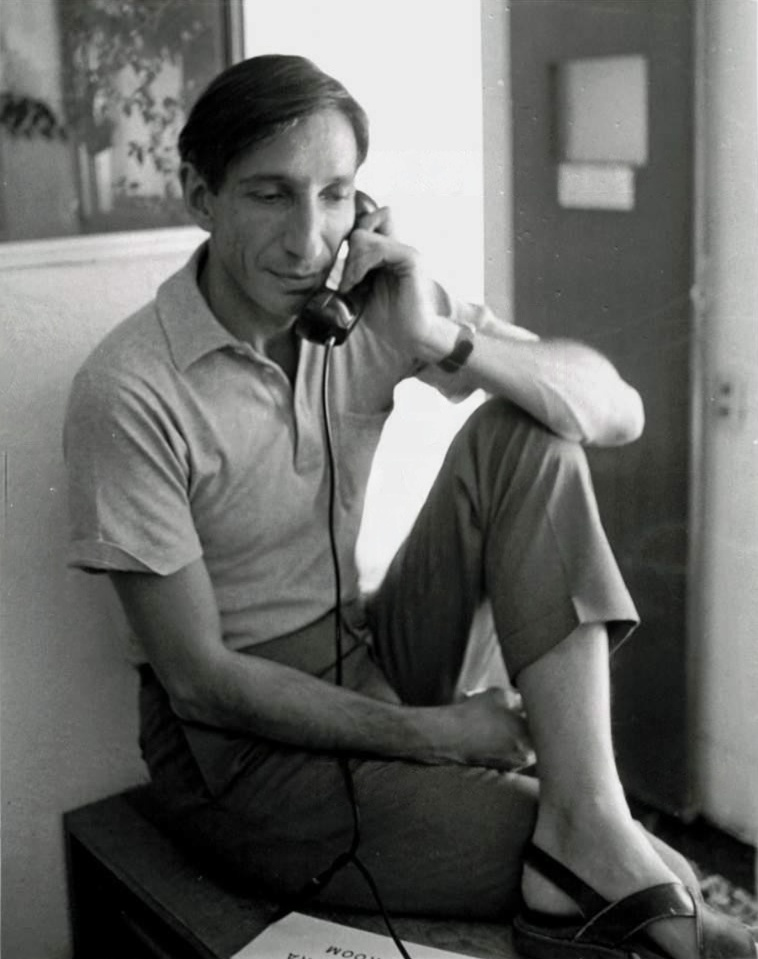
- Illich in 1969
- Born: Ivan Dominic Illich; September 4, 1926; Vienna, Austrian Republic
- Died: December 2, 2002 (aged 76); Bremen, Germany

Philosophical work
- Era: Contemporary philosophy
- Region: Western philosophy
- School: Christian philosophy
- Main interests: Philosophy of education; philosophy of technology

Ivan Dominic Illich (/ɪˈvɑːn ˈɪlɪtʃ/ iv-AHN IL-itch, Austrian German: [ˈiːvan ˈɪlɪtʃ]; 4 September 1926 – 2 December 2002) was an Austrian Catholic priest, theologian, philosopher, and social critic. His 1971 book Deschooling Society criticises modern society's institutional approach to education, an approach that he argued demotivates and alienates individuals from the process of learning. His 1975 book Medical Nemesis, importing to the sociology of medicine the concept of medical harm, in which he argues that industrialised society impairs quality of life through processes such as overmedicalisation, the pathologisation of normal conditions, and increased dependency on medical institutions. Illich called himself "an errant pilgrim."

== Biography ==
=== Early life ===
Ivan Dominic Illich was born on 4 September 1926 in Vienna, Austria, to Ivan Peter and Ellen Rose (née Regenstreif-Ortlieb) Illich. His father was a civil engineer and a diplomat from a landed Catholic family of Dalmatia, with property in the city of Split and wine and olive oil estates on the island of Brač. His mother came from a Sephardic Jewish family that had converted to Christianity from Germany and Austria-Hungary (Czernowitz, Bukowina). Ellen Illich was baptized Lutheran but converted to Catholicism upon marriage. Her father, Friedrich "Fritz" Regenstreif, was an industrialist who made his money in the lumber trade in Bosnia, later settling in Vienna, where he built an art nouveau villa.

His mother traveled to Vienna so that the best doctors could attend during childbirth; Ivan's father was not living in Central Europe at the time. When Ivan was three months old, he was taken along with his nurse to Split, Dalmatia (by then part of the Kingdom of Yugoslavia), to be shown to his paternal grandfather. There he was baptized on 1 December 1926. In 1928 his twin brothers Alexander and Michael, were born. In 1932 his parents divorced, and his mother took all three children back to her father's house in Vienna.

=== Education in Italy ===
In 1942, after his grandfather's death, when Ivan was 16 years old, his mother fled with him and his brothers from Vienna, Austria for Florence, Italy, to escape the Nazi persecution of Jews. Illich finished high school in Florence, and then went on to study histology and crystallography at the local University of Florence. Hoping to return to Austria following World War II, he enrolled in a doctorate in medieval history at the University of Salzburg with the hope of gaining legal residency as he was undocumented. He wrote a dissertation focusing on the historian Arnold J. Toynbee, a subject to which he would return in his later years. While working on his doctorate, he returned to Italy where he studied theology and philosophy at the Pontifical Gregorian University in Rome, as he wanted to become a Catholic priest. In 1951, he was ordained as a Catholic priest in Rome and offered his first Mass in the catacombs where the early Roman Christians hid from their persecutors.

=== Career ===
A polyglot, Illich spoke Italian, Spanish, French, and German fluently. He later learned Croatian, the language of his grandfathers, then Ancient Greek and Latin, in addition to Portuguese, Hindi, English, and other languages.

Following his ordination in 1951, he moved to the United States in order to pursue postgraduate studies at Princeton University. However, he deviated from these plans in order to become a parish priest at the Church of the Incarnation in Washington Heights, Manhattan, at that time a barrio of newly-arrived Puerto Rican immigrants. At Incarnation, Illich preached under the name of "John Illich", at the suggestion of the parish's pastor, who said that the name Ivan "sounded communist". At Incarnation, Illich became known as an ally of the Puerto Rican community, organizing cultural outlets for them, such as the San Juan Fiesta, a celebration of Puerto Rico and its patron saint which eventually evolved into the still-extant Puerto Rican Day Parade.

The success of Illich attracted the attention of the Archbishop of New York, Cardinal Spellman, and in 1956, at the age of 30, he was appointed vice-rector of the Catholic University of Puerto Rico, "a position he managed to keep for several years before getting thrown out—Illich was just a little too loud in his criticism of the Vatican's pronouncements on birth control and comparatively demure silence about the nuclear bomb." It was in Puerto Rico that Illich met Everett Reimer, and the two began to analyze their own functions as "educational" leaders. In 1959, he traveled throughout South America on foot and by bus.

The end of Illich's tenure at the university came in 1960 as the result of a controversy involving bishops James Edward McManus and James Peter Davis, who had denounced Governor Luis Muñoz Marín and his Popular Democratic Party for their positions in favor of birth control and divorce. The bishops also started their own rival Catholic party. Illich later summarized his opposition:

As a historian, I saw that it violated the American tradition of Church and State separation. As a politician, I predicted that there wasn't enough strength in Catholic ranks to create a meaningful platform and that failure of McManus's party would be disastrous on the already frail prestige of the Puerto Rican Church. As a theologian, I believe that the Church must always condemn injustice in the light of the Gospel, but never has the right to speak in favor of a specific political party.

After Illich disobeyed a direct order from McManus forbidding all priests from dining with Governor Muñoz, McManus ordered Illich to leave his post at the university, describing his presence as "dangerous to the Diocese of Ponce and its institutions."

Despite this display of insubordination and an order from Paul Francis Tanner, then general secretary of the National Catholic Welfare Conference, forbidding Illich from any official role in the organization's Latin American bureau, Illich maintained the support of the influential priest John J. Considine, who continued to push for Illich to have a role in training the Church's missionaries, personally funding trips to Mexico in order for Illich to scout locations.

Following his departure from Puerto Rico, Illich moved to Cuernavaca, Mexico, where he founded the Center of Intercultural Formation (CIF) in 1961, originally as a missionary training center. As the center became more influential, it became the Centro Intercultural de Documentación (CIDOC, or Intercultural Documentation Center), ostensibly a research center offering language courses to missionaries from North America and volunteers of the Alliance for Progress program initiated by John F. Kennedy. Illich described the center as documenting the role of the Vatican in development programs in the so-called Third World. Illich viewed the global wave of industrial development with suspicion, criticizing the assumptions underlying development initiatives. He described such initiatives as a form of industrial hegemony and an act of "war on subsistence". He sought to teach missionaries dispatched by the Church not to impose their own cultural values. "Throughout the late 1960s and early 1970s, CIDOC was part language school and part free university for intellectuals from all over the Americas." At the CIDOC, "Illich was able to develop his potent and highly influential critique of Third World development schemes and their fresh-faced agents: Kennedy's Alliance for Progress, the Peace Corps, and countless other missionary efforts bankrolled and organized by wealthy nations, foundations, and religious groups."

After ten years, critical analysis from the CIDOC of the institutional actions by the Church brought the organization into conflict with the Vatican due to associations with liberation theology and suspicions of Marxism. He faced opposition from members of the local Opus Dei chapter. Illich was called to Rome for questioning, due in part to a CIA report. While he was not convicted or punished by the Vatican, it was then that he decided to renounce active priesthood. In 1976, reportedly concerned by the influx of formal academics and the potential side effects of its own "institutionalization", Illich shut the center down with consent from the other members of the CIDOC. Several of the members subsequently continued language schools in Cuernavaca, some of which still exist. Illich, who had been made a monsignor at 33, himself resigned from the active priesthood in the late 1960s but continued to identify as a priest and occasionally performed private masses.

In the 1970s, Illich's ideas were discussed among left-leaning intellectuals in France, his thesis having been discussed in particular by André Gorz. However, his influence declined after the 1981 election of François Mitterrand, as some commentators regarded his views as pessimistic at a time when the French Left took control of the government.

In the 1980s and beyond, Illich traveled extensively, mainly splitting his time between the United States, Mexico, and Germany. He held an appointment as a Visiting Professor of Philosophy, Science, Technology, and Society at Pennsylvania State University. He also taught at the University of Bremen and University of Hagen.

During the last days of his life he admitted that he was greatly influenced by one of the Indian economists and adviser to M. K. Gandhi, J. C. Kumarappa, most notably his book, Economy of Permanence.

=== Personal life and death ===
Ivan Illich called himself "an errant pilgrim", "a wandering Jew and a Christian pilgrim", while clearly acknowledging his Dalmatian roots. He remarked that since leaving the old house of his grandparents on the island Brač in Dalmatia, he had never had a home.

Illich died on 2 December 2002 in Bremen, Germany. Not realised was his last wish: to die surrounded by close collaborators in Bologna amid the creation of his planned, new learning centre.

== Philosophical views ==
Illich followed the tradition of apophatic theology. A central theme in Illich’s work was his argument that Western modernity distorted the original ethical teachings of Western Christianity. He argued that attempts to codify New Testament principles into institutional rules as rules of behavior, duty, or laws, and to institutionalize them, without limits, is a corruption that Illich detailed in his analyses of modern Western institutions, including education, charity, and medicine, among others. Illich often used the Latin phrase Corruptio optimi quae est pessima, in English The corruption of the best is the worst.

Illich believed that the Biblical God taking human form, the Incarnation, marked world history's turning point, opening new possibilities for love and knowledge. As in the First Epistle of John, it invites any believer to seek God's face in everyone encountered. Describing this new possibility for love, Illich refers to the Parable of the Good Samaritan.

While Illich never referred to himself as an anarchist in print, he was closely associated with major figures in left-anarchist circles, notably Paul Goodman and unschooling advocate John Holt. Goodman is credited in Deschooling Society with having "radically obliged" Illich to revise his thinking and is described with great affection in Illich's 1990s interviews with David Cayley:

... I loved Goodman very much, but not from the beginning. In 1951, as a twenty-six-year-old man newly arrived in New York, I went to a public debate. This strange person arrived and fascinated everybody with his way of presenting himself. I was just then having my first experiences of sitting through cold turkey with neighbourhood kids from Washington Heights, and this guy carefully phrased his proposal that New York immediately decriminalize all substances you can ingest, because otherwise the city of New York would become an unlivable city within the next few years. He had recently played a major part in getting a law passed which recognized that the state should not interfere with the private activities of consenting adults. Well, I was shocked! I would not have suspected that within three of four years we would be good friends and that during the last part of his life he would spend considerable time with me in Cuernavaca. I consider Goodman one of the great thinkers I've known, and also a tender, touching person.

== Legacy ==
His first book, Deschooling Society, published in 1971, was a critique of compulsory mass education. He argued that what he described as an oppressive structure of the school system could not be reformed. It must be dismantled in order to free humanity from the crippling effects of the institutionalization of all of life. He went on to critique modern mass medicine. Illich was highly influential among intellectuals and academics. He became known worldwide for his progressive polemics about how activity expressive of truly human values could be preserved and expanded in human society in the face of widespread de-humanization.

In his several influential books, he argued that the overuse of the benefits of many modern technologies and social arrangements undermines human values and human self-sufficiency, freedom, and dignity.

Health, argues Illich, is the capacity to cope with the human reality of death, pain, and sickness. Technology can benefit many; yet, he believed modern mass medicine has gone too far, turning people into risk-averse consuming objects, turning healing into science, turning medical healers into drug-surgical technicians.

The Dark Mountain Project, a creative cultural movement founded by Dougald Hine and Paul Kingsnorth emphasizing an abandonment of narratives of modern civilization, drew their inspiration from the ideas of Ivan Illich.

== Published works ==
=== Deschooling Society ===
Illich gained public attention with his 1971 book Deschooling Society, a radical critique of educational practice in "modern" economies. Claiming examples of institutionalised education's ineffectiveness, Illich endorses self-directed education, supported by intentional social relations, in fluid informal arrangements:

Universal education through schooling is not feasible. It would be no more feasible if it were attempted by means of alternative institutions built on the style of present schools. Neither new attitudes of teachers toward their pupils nor the proliferation of educational hardware or software (in classroom or bedroom), nor finally the attempt to expand the pedagogue's responsibility until it engulfs his pupils' lifetimes will deliver universal education. The current search for new educational funnels must be reversed into the search for their institutional inverse: educational webs which heighten the opportunity for each one to transform each moment of his living into one of learning, sharing, and caring. We hope to contribute concepts needed by those who conduct such counterfoil research on education—and also to those who seek alternatives to other established service industries.

The final sentence, above, clarifies Illich's view that education's institutionalisation fosters society's institutionalisation, and so de-institutionalising education may help de-institutionalize society. Further, Illich suggests reinventing learning and expanding it throughout society and across persons' lifespans. Particularly striking in 1971 was his call for advanced technology to support "learning webs":

The operation of a peer-matching network would be simple. The user would identify himself by name and address and describe the activity for which he sought a peer. A computer would send him back the names and addresses of all those who had inserted the same description. It is amazing that such a simple utility has never been used on a broad scale for publicly valued activity.

According to a review in the Libertarian Forum, "Illich's advocacy of the free market in education is the bone in the throat that is choking the public educators." Yet, unlike libertarians, Illich opposes not merely publicly funded schooling, but schools as such. Thus, Illich's envisioned disestablishment of schools aimed not to establish a free market in educational services, but to attain a fundamental shift: a deschooled society. In his 1973 book After Deschooling, What?, he asserted, "We can disestablish schools, or we can deschool culture." In fact, he called advocates of free-market education "the most dangerous category of educational reformers."

Deschooling Society was highly regarded by John Holt and other leading advocates of unschooling, and has been widely read in the homeschooling community since its dramatic growth during the 1980s.

=== Tools for Conviviality ===
Tools for Conviviality was published in 1973, two years after Deschooling Society. In this newer work, Illich generalizes the themes that he had previously applied to the educational field: the institutionalization of specialized knowledge, the dominant role of technocratic elites in industrial society, and the need to develop new instruments for the reconquest of practical knowledge by the average citizen. He wrote that "[e]lite professional groups ... have come to exert a 'radical monopoly' on such basic human activities as health, agriculture, home-building, and learning, leading to a 'war on subsistence' that robs peasant societies of their vital skills and know-how. The result of much economic development is very often not human flourishing but 'modernized poverty', dependency, and an out-of-control system in which the humans become worn-down mechanical parts." Illich proposed that we should "invert the present deep structure of tools" in order to "give people tools that guarantee their right to work with independent efficiency."

Tools for Conviviality attracted worldwide attention. A résumé of it was published by French social philosopher André Gorz in Les Temps Modernes, under the title "Freeing the Future". The book's vision of tools that would be developed and maintained by a community of users had a significant influence on the first developers of the personal computer, notably Lee Felsenstein.

=== Medical Nemesis ===
In his Medical Nemesis, first published in 1975, also known as Limits to Medicine, Illich subjected contemporary Western medicine to detailed attack. He argued that the medicalization in recent decades of so many of life's vicissitudes—birth and death, for example—frequently caused more harm than good and rendered many people in effect lifelong patients. He marshalled a body of statistics to show what he considered the shocking extent of post-operative side-effects and drug-induced illness in advanced industrial society. He introduced to a wider public the notion of iatrogenic disease, which had been scientifically established a century earlier by British nurse Florence Nightingale. Others have since voiced similar views.

=== To Hell with Good Intentions ===
In his 1968 speech at the Conference on InterAmerican Student Projects (CIASP), Illich strongly opposes the presence of American Roman Catholic missionaries, the Peace Corps and organizations like the CIASP themselves - who invited him to speak - in Mexico. Illich says that the presence of American "do-gooders" is causing more harm than good. Rather, he suggests that the Americans should travel to Latin America as tourists or students, or else stay in their homeland, where they can at least know what they are doing.

== Publications ==
- Illich, Ivan (1951). Die philosophischen Grundlagen der Geschichtsschreibung bei Arnold J. Toynbee (ungedr. Diss. phil thesis). Salzburg: Universität Salzburg.
- —— (1970). The Church, Change and Development. Urban Training Center Press.
- —— (1971). Celebration of Awareness. Calder & Boyars. ISBN 978-0-7145-0837-5.
- —— (1971). Deschooling Society. ISBN 978-0-06-012139-6.
- —— (1973). Tools for Conviviality. Harper & Row. ISBN 978-0-06-080308-7.
- —— (1974). Energy and Equity. Harper & Row. ISBN 978-0-06-080327-8.
- —— (1975). Medical Nemesis. London: Calder & Boyars. ISBN 978-0-7145-1096-5. OCLC 224760852. Many reprintings.
- —— (1978). The Right to Useful Unemployment. Boyars. ISBN 978-0-7145-2628-7.
- —— (1978). Toward a History of Needs. Pantheon Books. ISBN 978-0-394-41040-1.
- —— (1981). Shadow Work. M. Boyars. ISBN 978-0-7145-2711-6.
- —— (1982). Gender. Pantheon Books. ISBN 978-0-394-52732-1.
- —— (1985). H_{2}O and the Waters of Forgetfulness. Dallas Institute of Humanities and Culture. ISBN 978-0-911005-06-6.
- (With Barry Saunders) ABC: The Alphabetization of the Popular Mind. North Point Press. 1988. ISBN 978-0-86547-291-4.
- —— (1992). In the Mirror of the Past. M. Boyars. ISBN 978-0-7145-2937-0.
- —— (1993). In the Vineyard of the Text: A Commentary to Hugh's Didascalicon. University of Chicago Press. ISBN 978-0-226-37235-8.
- —— (1994). "Health as one's own responsibility - No, thank you!" (PDF). Journal of Consciousness Studies. 1 (1): 25–32.
- —— (July 1995). Blasphemy: A Radical Critique of Our Technological Culture (We the People Series). Morristown, NJ: Aaron Press. ISBN 978-1-882206-02-5.
- (With David Cayley) The rivers north of the future The testament of Ivan Illich. Toronto: House of Anansi Press. 2005. ISBN 0-88784-714-5.
- (With Irving Kenneth Zola, John McKnight, Jonathan Caplan and Harley Shaiken) Disabling professions. London: Marion Boyars. 2011. ISBN 978-0-7145-2510-5.
- —— (2013). Disoccupazione creativa. Red Edizioni. ISBN 978-8857304991.
- ('Assembled by Valentina Borremans and Sajay Samuel') The Loss of the Senses. Sheffield: Equinox. 2026. ISBN 978-1800508644.

== See also ==
- Credentialism
- Critical pedagogy
- Critique of technology
- Degrowth
- Development criticism
- Ecopedagogy
- Free software movement
- Holistic education
- Open Source Ecology
- Shadow work
