= Vitorioso =

- Tango by Ernesto Nazareth
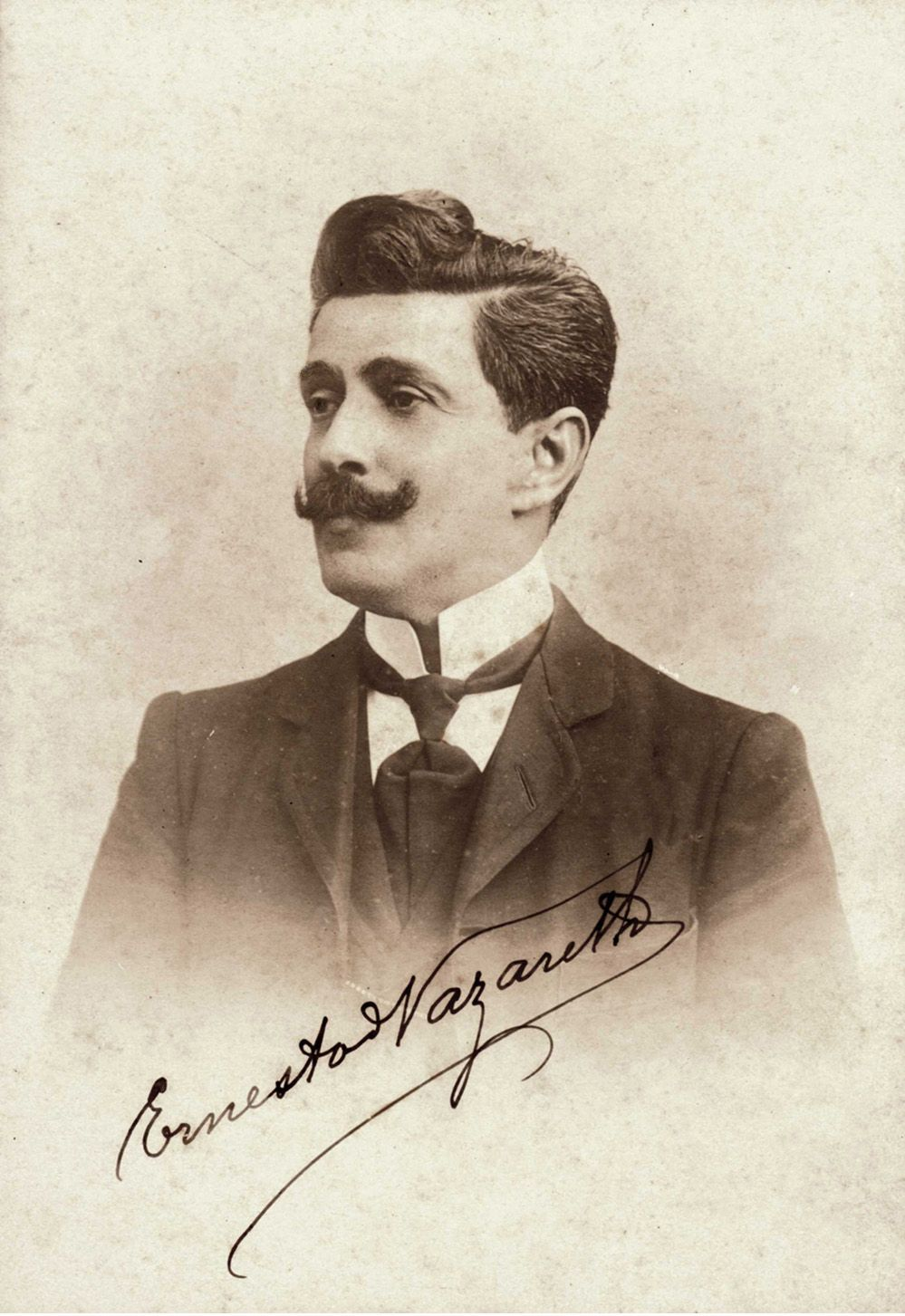
- Nazareth, in 1908
- Year: 1902
- Genre: tango
- Time: 2/4
- Duration: 4 minutes approximately
- Scoring: Solo piano

"Vitorioso", formerly entitled "Victorioso", (Note: The title changed after the Portuguese Orthographic Reform of 1911.) is a tango for solo piano written by Brazilian composer Ernesto Nazareth. It was composed circa 1902.

== Background ==
Despite becoming fairly well known for "Brejeiro" (1893), Ernesto Nazareth spent the final decades of the nineteenth century and the early years of the twentieth struggling financially, as it was common for composers to sell the rights to their works to publishers for a flat fee. Although he had already gained popularity as a composer, he did not give his first public concert until 1898; from then on, he also became increasingly recognized as a performer.

A few years later, in 1902, the first recording featuring music by Nazareth was released: a performance by Rio de Janeiro's Banda do Corpo de Bombeiros, issued by Edison Records. Vitorioso was written during this period, circa 1902, shortly before its publication in Rio de Janeiro, Nazareth's birthplace, by editor Manoel Antonio Gomes Guimarães (some sources, however, cite 1903 or 1904 as the year of composition).

The work was dedicated to the Escola de Táctica do Realengo, a military school located in the Realengo neighborhood. In a practice not uncommon among composers in the pre-radio era, Nazareth also dedicated other works to military bands, including "Ipanema" (1928).

== Structure ==
This piece is a four-minute tango (or Brazilian tango, according to some sources) scored for solo piano. It is in the key of E♭ major, although, as was customary in the genre, it modulates to other keys in different sections. The entire piece is in 2/4 time, with no tempo indication, and is played p throughout except for a brief passage near the end, which is marked f. The formal structure is as follows:

- Section A, with the main theme in E-flat major.
- Section A, repeated, this time with a different ending, which introduces the next section.
- Section B, which presents the second theme in the piece's relative minor, C minor.
- Section B, also repeated with a different ending to introduce the main theme again.
- Section A, which exhibits the main theme again in E-flat major with no variation.
- Section C, which is the typical trio section, marked "duvidoso" (hesitant) in the score. It starts p and slowly progresses to mf and then to f. This third theme is in A♭ major.
- Section C, also repeated for consistency with the other section, this time with a different ending that introduces the main theme again.
- Section A, returning to E-flat major and bringing the piece to a close.

== Recordings ==
The following is a list of recordings of "Vitorioso":

Pianist	Date of recording	Place of recording	Label	Notes
Polly Ferman	November 1987	Holy Trinity Church, New York, USA	Musical Heritage Society	
Joshua Rifkin	August 1990	St. George's Church, Bristol, UK	London Records / Decca	
Yukio Miyazaki	1995	—	Victor Entertainment	
Mari Kumamoto	April 1997	King Records Segikuchidai Studio No. 1, Bunkyō, Japan	King Records	
