= St. Mary Church (Grand Street, Manhattan) =

Church in New York City

St. Mary's Church
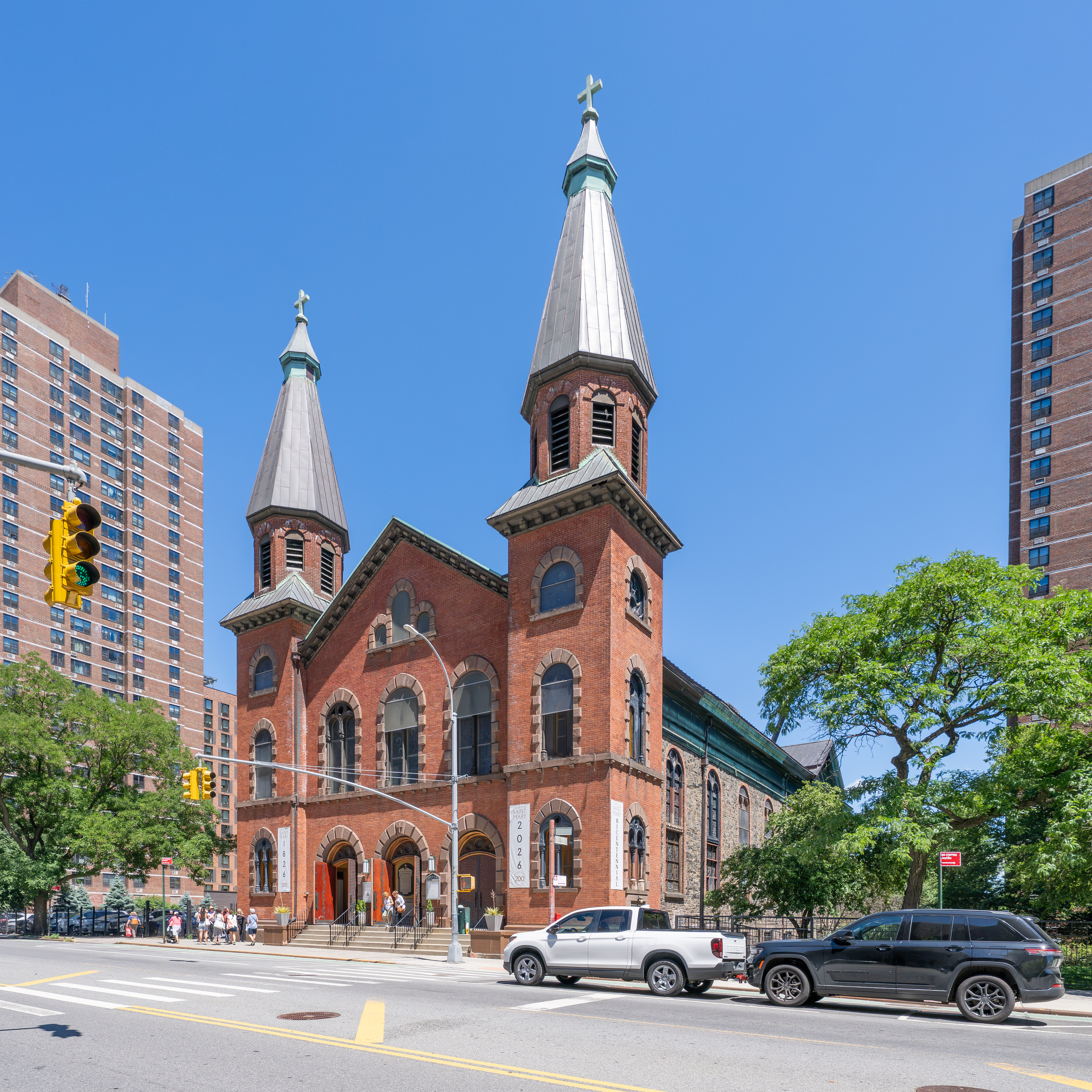
- (2026)
- Interactive map of the St. Mary's Church area

General information
- Location: Manhattan, New York City, United States
- Coordinates: 40°42′56.42″N 73°59′6.35″W
- Construction started: 1832
- Completed: 1833 (original church); 1864 (enlarged with new facade); 1871 (additional changes)
- Client: Archdiocese of New York

Design and construction
- Architect: Patrick C. Keely (facade)

Website
- https://saintmarygrand.org

The Church of St. Mary is a parish church in the Archdiocese of New York, located at 438–440 Grand Street between Pitt and Attorney Streets on the Lower East Side of Manhattan, New York City. Established in 1826 to serve Irish immigrants living in the neighborhood, it is the third oldest Catholic parish in New York. St. Mary's will celebrate its bicentennial as a parish in 2026.

The church itself was built in 1832–33, and was then enlarged and had its facade replaced in 1871 by the prolific church architect Patrick Charles Keely. The original portion is the second-oldest Catholic structure in the city, after St. Patrick's Old Cathedral, which was built in 1815.

== History ==
Before their sanctuary was built, services were held in a former Presbyterian church on Sheriff Street. Rev. Hatton Walsh was named pastor. In 1831, anti-Catholic nativists set fire to the church, but it was not completely destroyed and continued to operate. The first New York chapter of the Ancient Order of Hibernians was established in 1836 at nearby St. James Church partly in response.

In 1832 the cornerstone was laid for the present building, which was dedicated in June 1833. Rev. William J. Quarter, curate at St. Peter's on Barclay Street, was named pastor. Quarter would later become the first bishop of Chicago.

Originally designed in the Greek Revival style, the new red brick facade designed by Patrick Charles Keely in 1864 was in the Romanesque style and featured twin spires. Other changes were made by Lawrence O'Connor in 1871.

The Irish-American prelate, Rev. Michael McKenna, who had ties to Irish nationalist movement, was assistant pastor here in 1868 before becoming the first pastor of the newly separated – from St. Mary's parish – parish of St. Rose of Lima. Charles Edward McDonnell, future Bishop of Brooklyn, was assigned as curate here in the autumn of 1878.

The New York City Landmarks Preservation Commission designated St. Mary Church as an individual city landmark on April 7, 2026, citing the building's ties to the history of New York City's immigrants. The LPC described the church as the Lower East Side's oldest sanctuary for a Catholic church.

== See also ==
- List of New York City Designated Landmarks in Manhattan below 14th Street
