= Holy Cross Church (Bronx) =

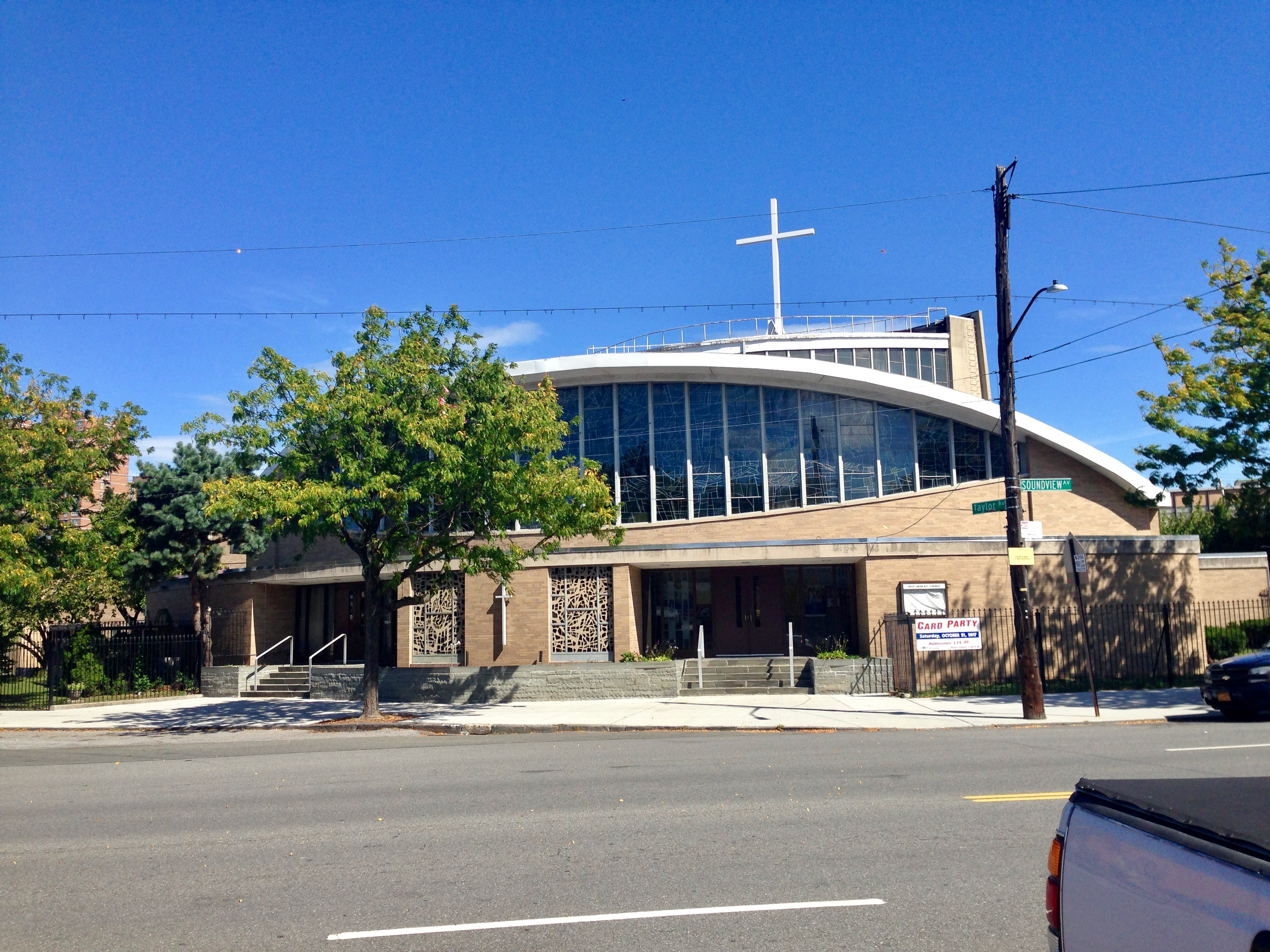
- Holy Cross Church
- 40°49′4″N 73°51′42.4″W
- Location: Soundview, The Bronx, New York City
- Country: United States
- Denomination: Roman Catholic Church
- Website: holycrossbronx.com

History
- Founded: 1921 (105 years ago)

Architecture
- Architect(s): Brother Cajetan Baumann, O.F.M.
- Architectural type: Modern architecture

Administration
- Archdiocese: Archdiocese of New York
- Parish: Holy Cross

Clergy
- Pastor: Fr. John J. Higgins

Holy Cross School
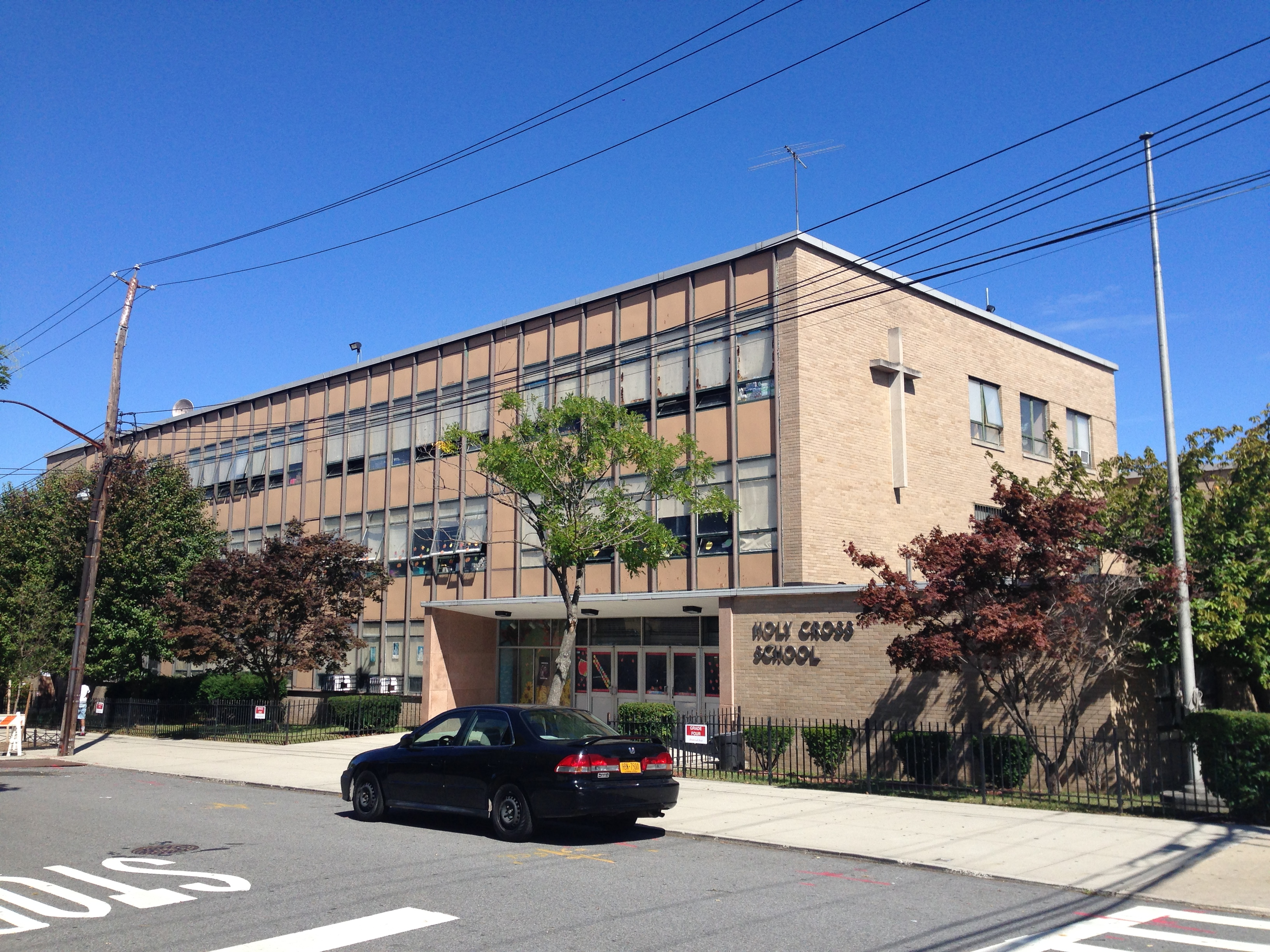
- Holy Cross School
- Soundview, The Bronx; New York City; United States

Information
- Type: Elementary, secondary
- Denomination: Roman Catholic
- Oversight: Roman Catholic Archdiocese of New York
- NCES School ID: 00920094
- Grades: K–8
- Enrollment: 365
- Campus type: Urban
- Website: holycrossbx.org

The Church of Holy Cross is a Roman Catholic parish church under the authority of the Roman Catholic Archdiocese of New York, located at 600 Soundview Avenue, Bronx, New York City, New York 10473. The rectory address is the same.

== Buildings ==
The church is located on the east side of Soundview Avenue at the intersection with Taylor Avenue. The church was designed by Brother Cajetan Baumann, O.F.M. The design is a typical "high-concept" Modernist concrete and stained-glass shell, reminiscent of Hugh Stubbins Jr.'s 1957 Haus der Kulturen der Welt, the former Kongresshalle (nicknamed the "Pregnant Oyster") in Berlin. The school is a typical mid-20th-century Modernist three-storey concrete and glazed block.

== Parish history ==
The parish was established in 1921. The Franciscan Friars administered the parish for nearly 90 years, but withdrew from the parish in 2008 and were replaced by archdiocesan clergy. Archbishop Roberto Octavio Gonzalez Nieves, OFM (archbishop of San Juan Puerto Rico since 1999) was the Pastor of this community when he was elected auxiliary bishop of Boston in 1988.

== Holy Cross School ==
The school address is 1846 Randall Avenue, Bronx, New York 10473. The school was established in 1923, and for much of its history was staffed by the Franciscan Sisters of Allegheny. The school has around 419 students in grades from prekindergarten to 8th grade. According to the Middle States Association of Colleges and Schools, "Holy Cross demonstrated that it is effectively advancing the quality of educational experiences it offers to its students, meets its responsibilities to the public and the profession of education, and complies with the standards of accreditation that are established by the Commission on Elementary Schools."

== Notable alumni ==
The musician Leon Heyward attended Holy Cross School. As "MC Sundance", he was a member of the "Jazzy Five", one of the first rap groups to form in the South Bronx during the 1970s. He was a survivor of the attacks of 9/11 at the World Trade Center, but later died from exposure to the various air-borne pollutants released in the destruction of the buildings, and was officially recorded as a victim of the terrorist attack.
