= St. Teresa of the Infant Jesus's Church (Staten Island) =

Building in New York, United States

Coordinates: 40°36′47.5″N 74°7′5.7″W

The Church of St. Teresa of the Infant Jesus
- Interactive map of the The Church of St. Teresa of the Infant Jesus area

General information
- Location: West New Brighton, Staten Island, New York City, United States of America
- Construction started: 1953
- Cost: $224,000
- Client: Roman Catholic Archdiocese of New York

Design and construction
- Architect: Robert J. Reiley

The Church of St. Teresa of the Infant Jesus is a parish church in the Roman Catholic Archdiocese of New York, located at 1634 Victory Boulevard, Castleton Corners, Staten Island, New York City. The church was built in 1953 on the designs of the prolific architect Robert J. Reiley for $224,000. The church has a co-educational parochial school.

Father John Joseph O'Hara, a future bishop, served St. Teresa's as parochial vicar during 1992–2000 and then as pastor during 2000–2012.
