= Rangel Houses =

Public housing development in Manhattan, New York

- NYCHA Property
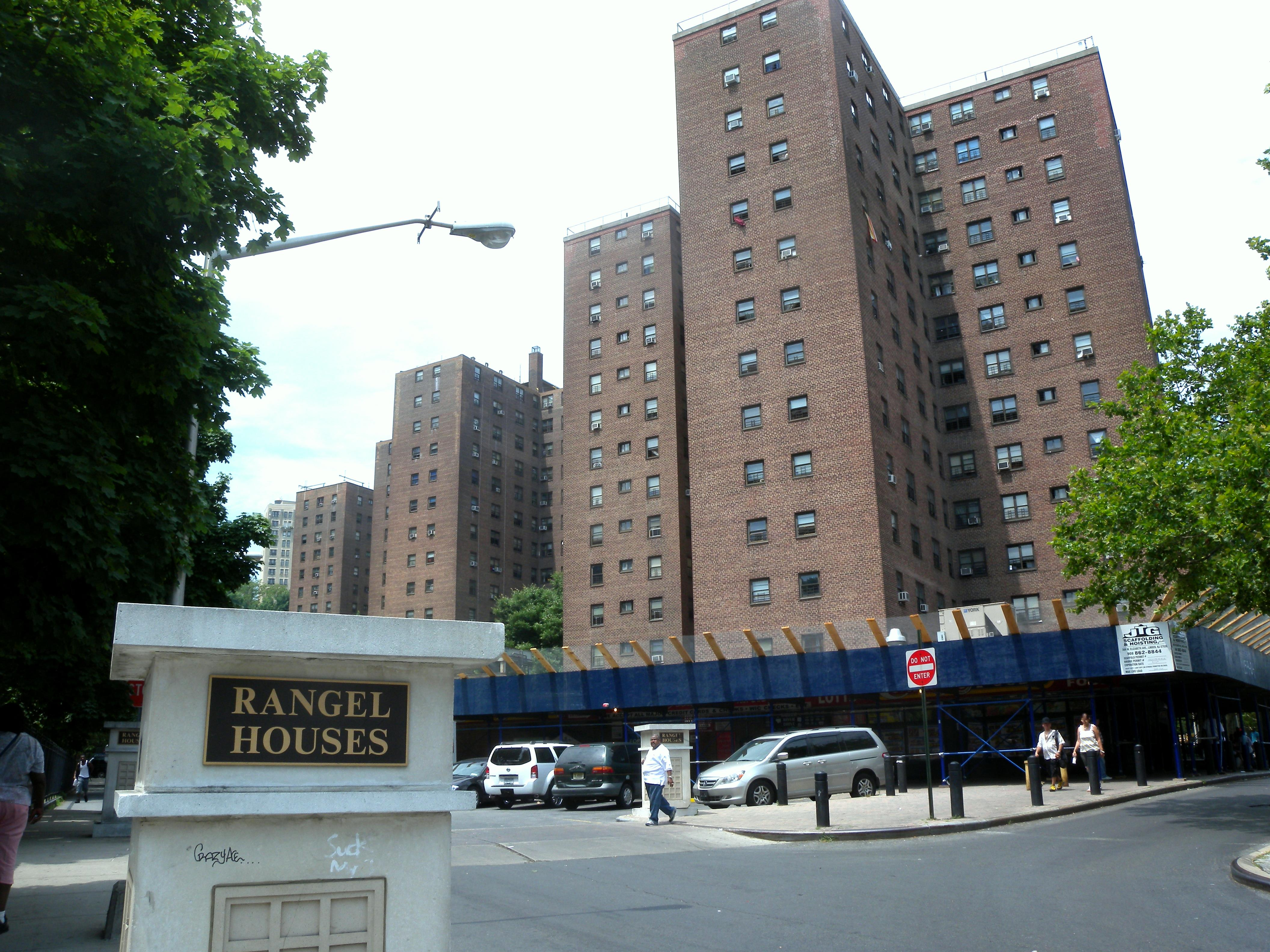
- Interactive map of Rangel Houses
- Country: United States
- State: New York
- City: New York City
- Borough: Manhattan

Area
  - Total: 10.83 acres (4.38 ha)

Population
  - Total: 1,920
- Zip Codes: 10032 and 10033

Rangel Houses are a public housing project owned by the New York City Housing Authority (NYCHA). The housing complex consists of eight 14-story buildings and is located between the Harlem River Drive and the Harlem River Driveway in the Washington Heights and Harlem neighborhoods of Manhattan in New York City. It was named after Ralph J. Rangel. The housing complex has 1,920 residents as of 2025.

== History ==
This NYCHA property was completed in September 1951. Previously called the Colonial Park Houses, the complex was renamed in 1977 after Ralph J. Rangel, the brother of Congressman Charles Rangel. Ralph J. Rangel had served as the president of the Colonial Park Tenants' Association.

The housing project was designed by architects Robert J. Reiley, Julian Whittlesey and Harry M. Prince. It was originally located on the north side of the Polo Grounds, a stadium that was demolished in 1964 to make way for the construction of the Polo Grounds Towers (another housing complex operated by NYCHA).

=== 21st century ===
The FEMA funded the Rangel Houses Complex except for Buildings III, IV, and V with the Back-Up Power Generators on their rooftops and more security on the buildings and to remove the hazardous materials on the buildings and clean its crawl spaces. In Building I, the FEMA replaced many kinds of water pumps and replaced the hot water tank with related pumping.

In October 2023, NYCHA announced that the repairs and redevelopments will be equipped to 984 apartments with Permanent Affordability Commitment Together (PACT) and totals over $552M. This redevelopment began in early 2025 with the Genesis Companies and the Community League of the Heights (CLOTH). The Rangel Houses were added to the National Register of Historic Places in 2026.

== Notable residents ==
- Kool DJ Red Alert, disc jockey
- Biz Markie, rapper and singer
- Jamal Mashburn, professional basketball player

== See also ==
- New York City Housing Authority
