= SS. Peter and Paul's Church (Bronx) =

Catholic parish in New York City

Coordinates: 40°49′17.64″N 73°54′37.78″W

The Church of Saints Peter and Paul
- Interactive map of the The Church of Saints Peter and Paul area

General information
- Location: Bronx, New York City, United States of America
- Client: Archdiocese of New York

Design and construction
- Architect: Robert J. Reiley

The Church of Saints Peter and Paul is a Catholic parish church under the authority of the Roman Catholic Archdiocese of New York, located at 833 St. Ann's Avenue, Bronx, New York City. The parish was established in 1897.

According to Bronx Catholic, the church dates from 1932. The architect was Robert J. Reiley.

It is one of the parishes in the Bronx that is home to communities of the Neocatechumenal Way.
