= St. Stephen of Hungary Church (New York City) =

Catholic church in Manhattan, New York

Coordinates: 40.77388°N 73.95058°W

The Church of St. Stephen of Hungary (Szent István Római Katolikus Magyar Templom)
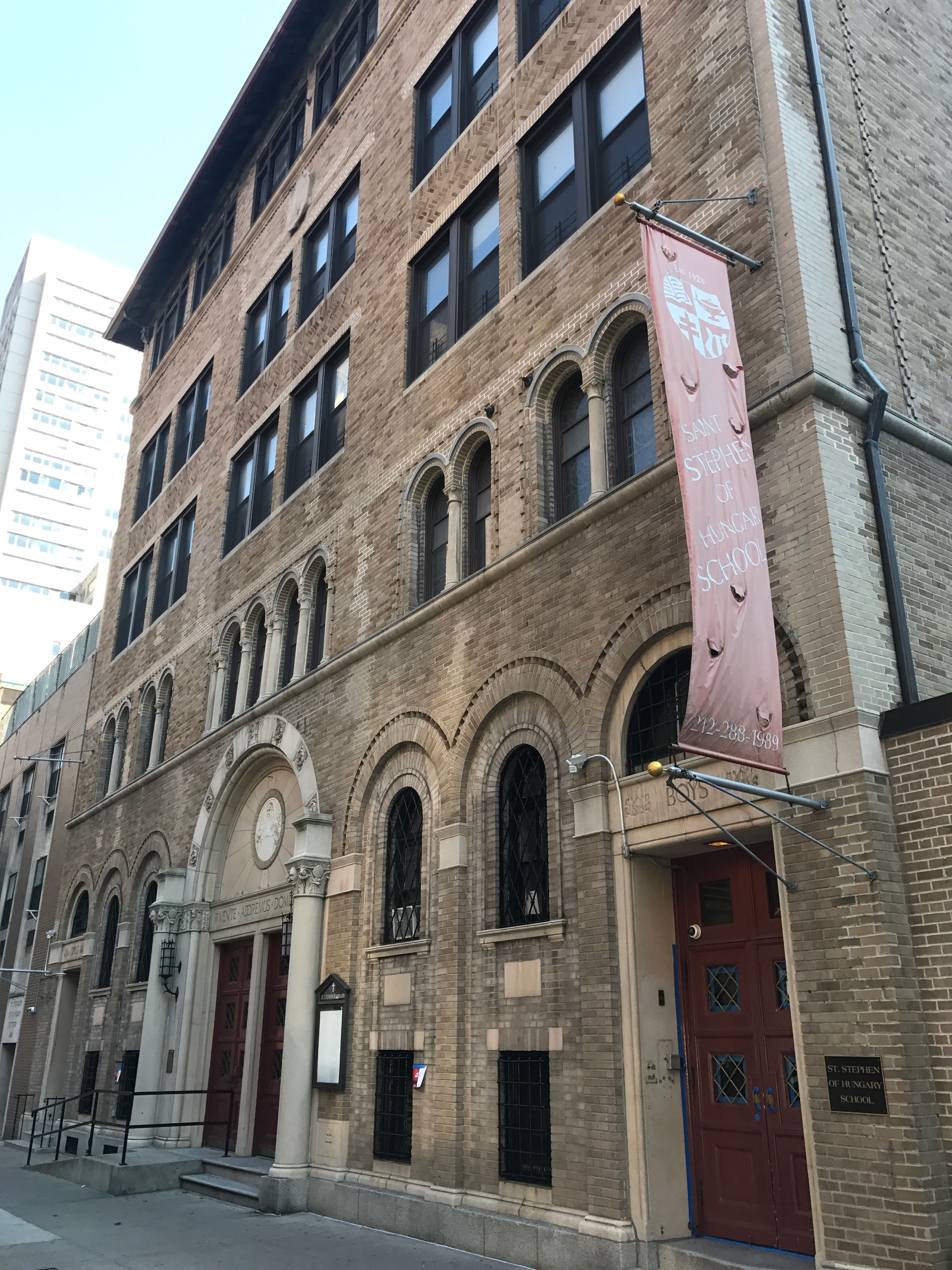
- The exterior of St. Stephen of Hungary Church in New York City
- Interactive map of the The Church of St. Stephen of Hungary (Szent István Római Katolikus Magyar Templom) area

General information
- Architectural style: Romanesque Revival
- Location: Manhattan, New York City, United States
- Construction started: 1926 (for church with school plans); 1960 (for rectory plans); 1965 (for rectory plans)
- Completed: 1927?, 1928 (for church)
- Cost: $240,000 (for 1926 church with school); $300,000 (for 1960 rectory); $300,000 (for 1965 rectory)
- Client: Roman Catholic Archdiocese of New York

Design and construction
- Architects: Joseph H. McGuire of 5 Columbus Circle (for 1926 church with school plans--possibly unbuilt); Emil Szendy (for 1928 church); Brother Cajetan J. B. Baumann, O.F.M., of 44 Whitehall Street (for 1960 rectory plans); Joseph Mitchell of 355 West 54 Street (for 1965 rectory plans)

The Church of St. Stephen of Hungary (Szent István Római Katolikus Magyar Templom) is a Roman Catholic church in the Archdiocese of New York, located at 402-412 East 82nd Street, Manhattan, New York City. The former parish of St. Stephen was administered by the Order of Friars Minor from its founding in 1922 until its merger with St. Joseph's in 2015.

== History ==
The congregation was established in 1902 by Lászlo Perényi, a Catholic priest from Hungary to serve the growing immigrant population from that country in the city. It had no permanent facility until three years later, when it moved into a former Presbyterian church on 14th street. Growth in the parish led to plans to build a new church and school in 1927 in the Yorkville neighborhood of Manhattan, which became a center for several Central European ethnic groups, most notably German and Hungarian.

In November 2014, the archdiocese announced that St. Stephen of Hungary Parish was one of 31 parishes which would be merged into other parishes. St. Stephen Parish and St. Elizabeth of Hungary Parish were to be merged into St. Monica Parish at 413 East 79th Street.

A High Mass for the Feast of St. Stephen took place on August 23, 2015, the last major event for the parish. The final Mass was held on August 30. After that, the Hungarian congregation moved to the nearby Church of St. Joseph.

== Buildings ==
Plans were filed for a three-story brick church and school (both with basement and tile roofs) in 1926 to designs by Joseph H. McGuire of 5 Columbus Circle at a cost of $240,000. According to the AIA Guide to NYC (Fifth Edition, 2010), the Romanesque Revival church was built (or at least completed) in 1928 to the designs of a different architect, Emil Szendy. There are no referenced plans filed with the city for a church designed by Szendy; however, he may have worked for McGuire.

Similarly confusing is the attribution for the rectory. The Rev B. J. Dudley had plans for a four-story friary at 402-412 East 82nd Street designed in 1960 and filed with the city to designs of Brother Cajetan J. B. Baumann, O.F.M., of 44 Whitehall Street, for $300,000. Plans for a three-story friary at 414-416 E 82nd Street were drawn up in 1965 and filed with the city to designs of Joseph Mitchell of 355 West 54 Street for $300,000.
