= Church of the Sacred Heart of Jesus (New York City) =

Church in New York City, United States

Coordinates: 40°45′54.34″N 73°59′25.44″W

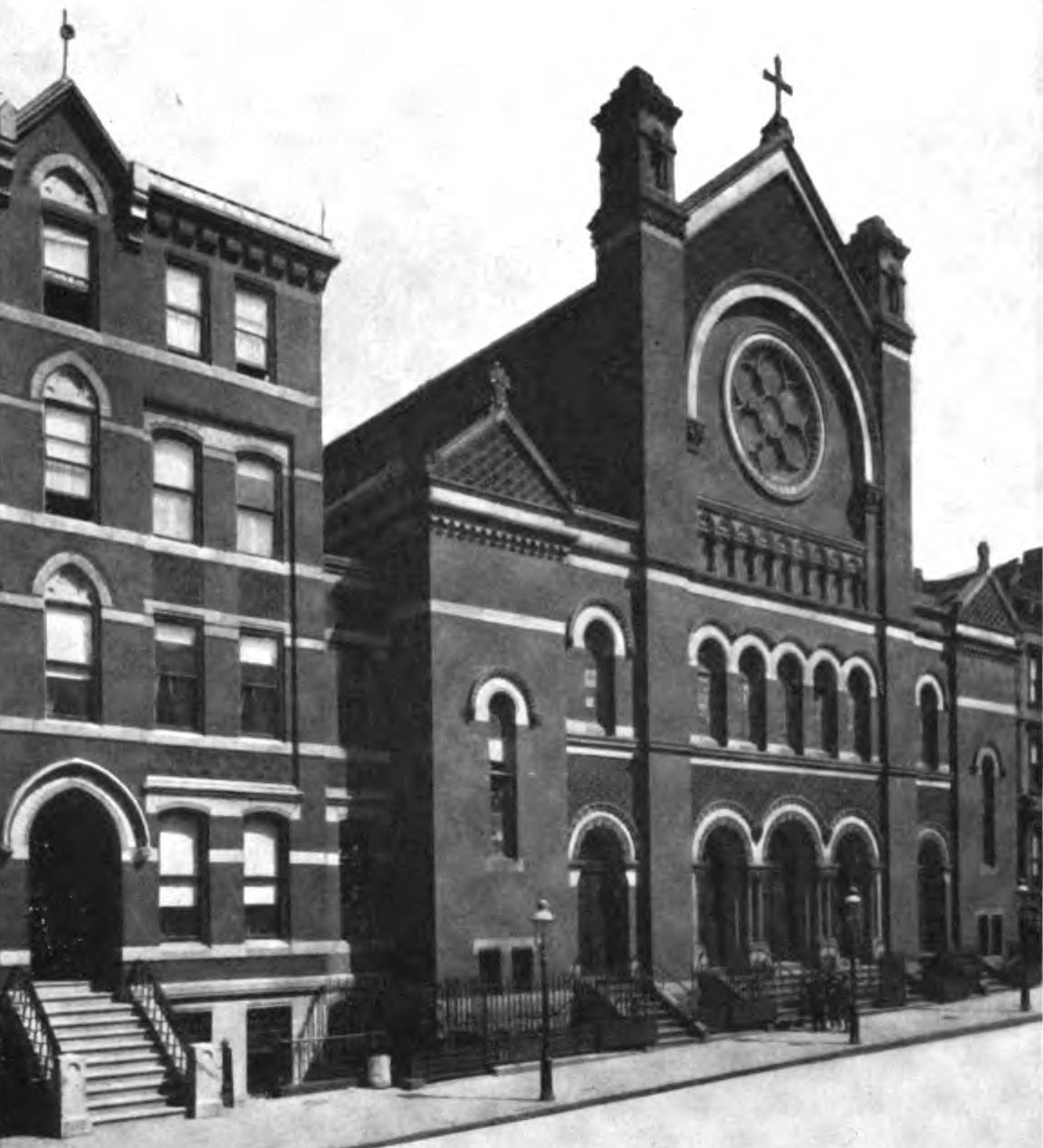
- The church as it appeared in 1914
- Interactive map of the Church of the Sacred Heart of Jesus area

General information
- Architectural style: Victorian Romanesque
- Location: Hell's Kitchen, Manhattan, New York City
- Construction started: 1884
- Completed: 1885 and c.1901 (according to the AIA Guide to NYC)
- Owner: The Roman Catholic Archdiocese of New York

Technical details
- Structural system: Masonry brick with terracotta trim

Design and construction
- Architect: Napoleon LeBrun & Sons

Church of the Sacred Heart of Jesus
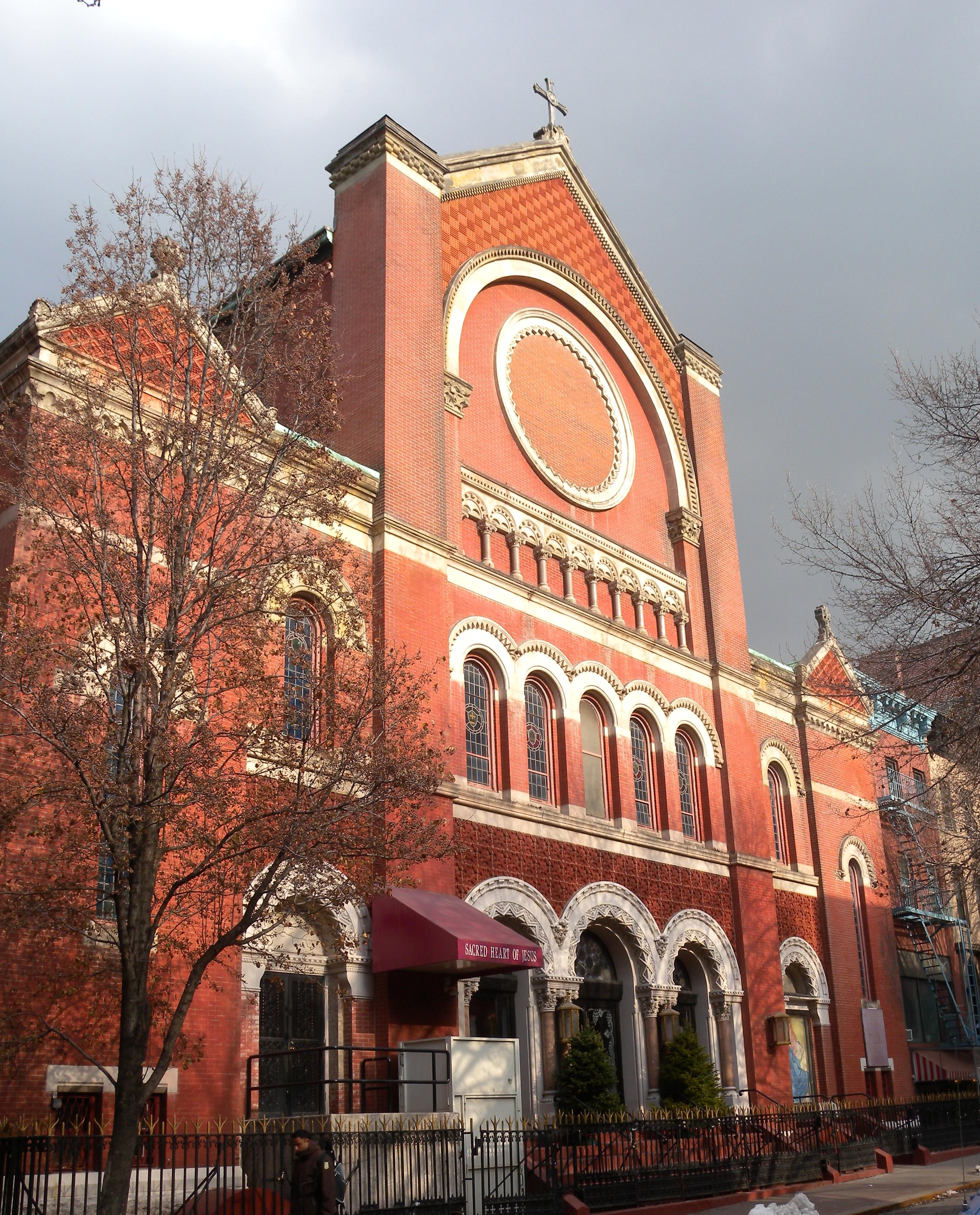
- Church of the Sacred Heart of Jesus
- Location: 457 West 51st Street, New York, New York 10019
- Country: United States
- Denomination: Roman Catholic
- Website: http://shjnycparish.org/

History
- Founded: 1876
- Founder: Rev. Martin J. Brophy
- Dedication: Sacred Heart of Jesus
- Dedicated: May 17, 1885

Architecture
- Architect(s): Napoleon LeBrun & Sons
- Years built: 1884-1885

Administration
- Archdiocese: New York

Clergy
- Pastor: Rev. Gabriel Piedrahita

The Church of the Sacred Heart of Jesus is a Roman Catholic parish church, located in Hell's Kitchen/Clinton, Manhattan, New York City. Founded in 1876, it is a parish of the Archdiocese of New York and is located at 457 West 51st Street. Sacred Heart of Jesus School is located at 456 West 52nd Street.

== History ==
The parish was founded in 1876 with the Rev. Martin J. Brophy as the first pastor. The congregation first met in the former Plymouth Baptist Church at 487 West 51st Street.

Vicar-General Mooney, pastor of the church in the 1890s, was a strong proponent of the parochial school system, as opposed to secular public schools. During a sermon at the dedication to the now closed and demolished St. Rose of Lima Parish School, he "urged his hearers to send their children to the parochial schools, where, he said, the religious instruction they would receive was far more important than the secular instruction they could receive in the public schools."

== Buildings ==
It is one of the largest churches in Midtown Manhattan. The congregation was mostly Irish and German.

According to the parish history, the cornerstone of the present Victorian Romanesque church building was laid on July 23, 1884, and the finished church building was dedicated by The Most Rev. Michael A. Corrigan, Archbishop of New York, on May 17, 1885. According to the AIA Guide to NYC (1978), the "symmetric confection of deep red brick and matching terra cotta frosted with light-colored stone arches, band courses, and copings" was built in Romanesque Revival to the designs by the prominent architectural firm of Napoleon LeBrun & Sons. The address listed in 1892 was 447 West 51st Street.

In 1966, the interior of the church was the first in the Archdiocese of New York to be reconfigured after the Second Vatican Council.

== Pastors ==
- Rev. Martin J. Brophy (1876-?), first pastor
- Rev. Joseph I. Norris (1930-?), transferred here from being pastor at the former St. Rose's Church
- Rev Msgr. Joachim Beaumont (1997-2009)
- Rev. Gabriel Piedrahita (2009- 2021)
- Rev. Lorenzo Ato (2021- 2023)

== Sacred Heart of Jesus School ==
The parish school was considered for closing by Archbishop Dolan but escaped a decision on 11 January 2011 and is still under review.
