= Charles Bosseron Chambers =

American painter (1880–1964)

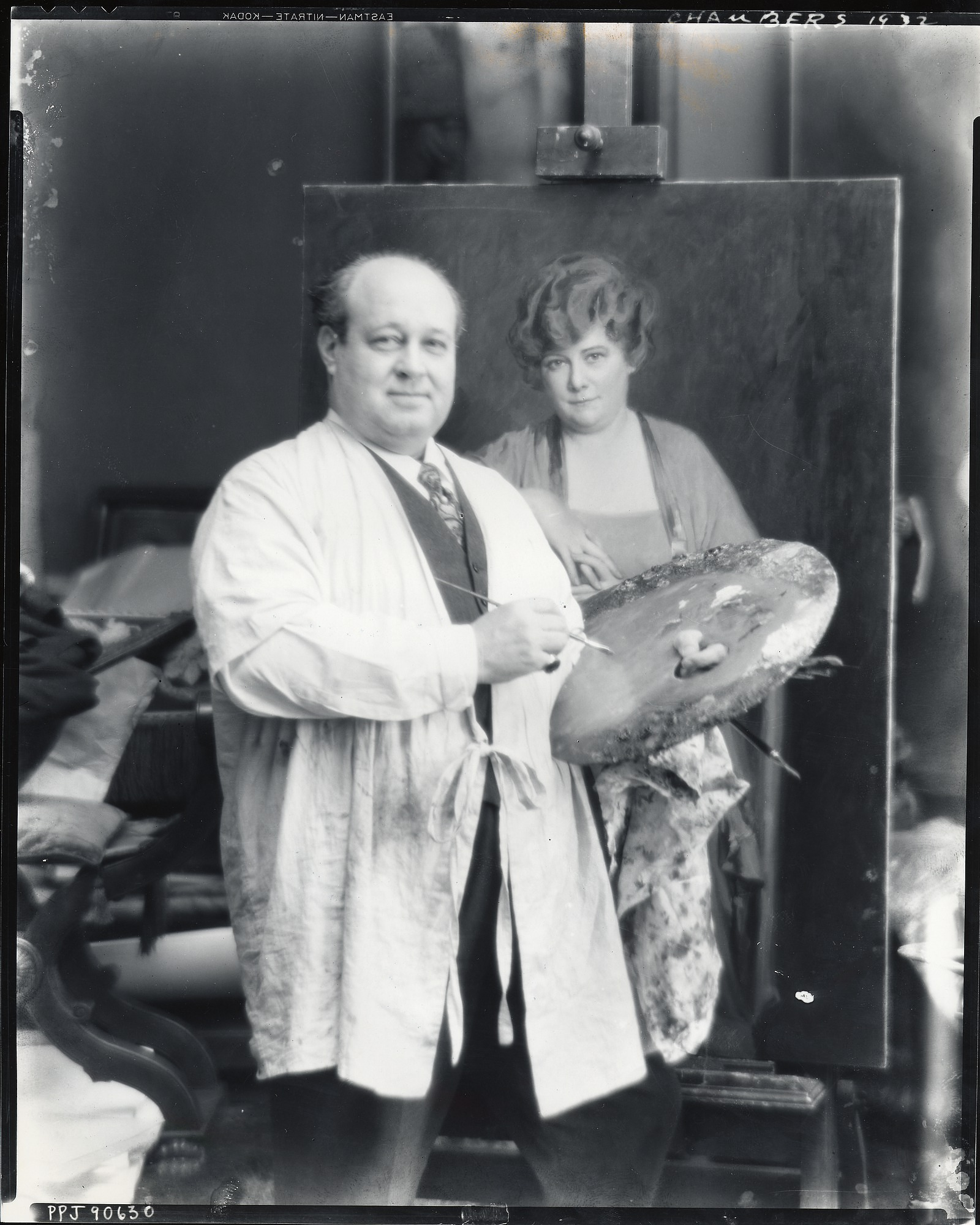
- Chambers in his studio, 1932.
- Born: Charles Bosseron Chambers; May 13, 1880; St. Louis, Missouri, U.S.
- Died: May 1964 (aged 83–84); New York City, U.S.
- Education: Berlin Royal Academy; Royal Academy of Vienna; Saint Louis University
- Known for: Religious paintings, Light of the World
- Notable work: Light of the World; The Return
- Style: Religious art; portrait painting
- Spouse: Anne

Charles Bosseron Chambers (C. Bosseron Chambers) (1880–1964) was an American painter, illustrator and teacher. The Reading Eagle describes Chambers as the "Norman Rockwell of Catholic art" and reports that his paintings have become collectible. He is best known for the Light of the World, the most popular religious print in America during the first half of the 20th century.

== Life ==
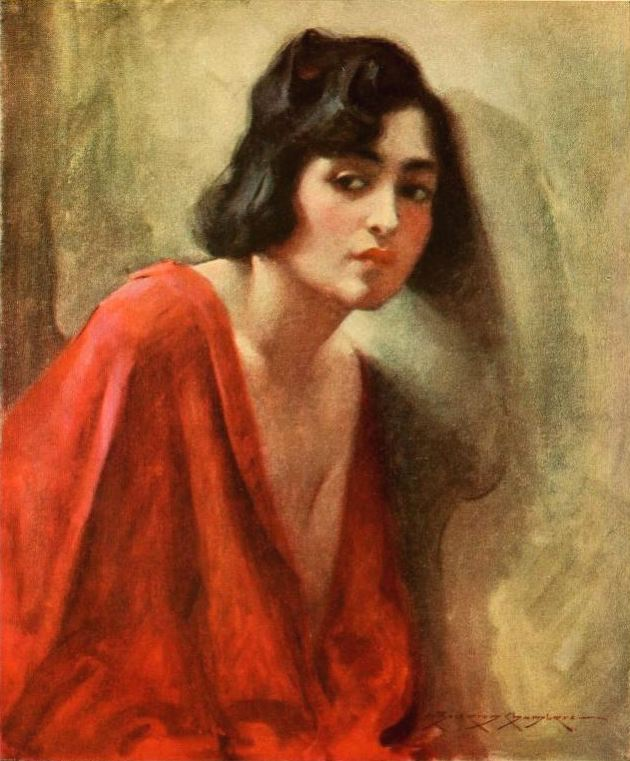
Gracia by Charles Bosseron Chambers

Charles Bosseron Chambers was born in St. Louis, Missouri, on May 13, 1880. His father, an Irish captain in the British Army, was a convert to Catholicism; his mother was from a St. Louis family of French descent. He was brought up in a devout Catholic household. The youngest of several children, Charles was sent to local schools and was graduated from Saint Louis University. He later adopted the middle name "Bosseron" to reflect his French heritage.

Chambers studied art for six years under Louis Schultz of the Berlin Royal Academy and then with Aleis Hrdliczka at the Royal Academy of Vienna. He also studied for six years with Johannes Schumacher in Dresden, and spent some time in Italy.

Due to his mother's failing health, the family moved to Palm Beach, Florida, where he began his art career. Chambers is considered a society painter, having done portraits of many of the leading socialites of the early 20th century such as Henry Flagler, actor Joseph Jefferson, members of the Vanderbilt family and others.

In 1916, Chambers moved to Manhattan with his wife Anne, the niece of Archbishop Patrick Feehan of Chicago and established himself in the Carnegie Studios, Carnegie Hall, where he had a private studio. Chambers was a member of the Society of Illustrators, in New York City, and the Salmagundi Club, an important art club also in the city. In April 1921 his work was exhibited at the Babcock Galleries on 49th St., in 1923 he illustrated Sir Walter Scott's Quentin Durward for Scribners. In November 1935, a number of portraits were on display at the Macbeth Gallery on E. 57th St. His work can now be seen at the Missouri Historical Society in St. Louis and at the Osceola Club in St. Augustine, Florida, among other places.

Between 1920 and 1950, millions of Chambers religious paintings were reproduced and widely displayed. While he continued to accept commissions for society portraits, it was his work in the religious field, prints, holy cards, calendars and magazine covers that brought him national recognition and a steady source of income.

Charles Bosseron Chambers died in New York in 1964.

== Works ==
Chambers worked in oil painting, water colors, and charcoal drawings. The Reading Eagle describes Chambers as the "Norman Rockwell of Catholic art" and reports that his paintings have become highly sought after; his most famous painting is one titled Light of the World in which Jesus is portrayed as a young boy.

=== Light of the World ===
In 1919, Chambers was commissioned to do paintings for the side altars in the newly built St. Ignatius Church in Rogers Park, Chicago, Illinois. There, Chambers produced a painting of St. Joseph holding the infant Christ. A detail of that painting, the face of four year old model Gilbert DeMille, son of the custodian at St. Ignatius School, became the Light of the World. Between 1920 and 1940, millions of copies were sold. The print can be seen over the priest's desk in the 1948 film The Miracle of the Bells. Chambers also painted the fourteen Stations of the Cross in the Church. St Ignatius Church was closed by the Archdiocese of Chicago in August 2021.

=== The Return ===
According to a popular account, one day, Chambers stopped by the Church of the Holy Innocents on 37th St. for Mass. Afterwards he observed a young man praying before a life-size crucifix and immediately made a quick sketch. In later speaking to the man, Chambers learned that he was a Frenchman who had drifted away from religion since coming to New York, but was now heading back to fight in World War I, and had prayed for a return to the faith. Chambers produced an oil painting from the sketch.

According to the American Art News, "His remarkable picture, The Return, which shows a soldier at the foot of a crucifix, and enveloped in a certain divine mystery and depth of sentiment, compelling and convincing, has been reproduced by one of the largest publishing companies in color and sepia, and having decided success." After the war, the soldier wrote to Chambers to inform him that having survived the war, he had entered a monastery. The refurbished crucifix, now termed "The Return Crucifix", is still at Holy Innocents, located in the rear right corner of the church. There is also a stained glass rendition of Chambers' painting in the choir loft.
