= Michael McKenna (priest) =

Michael McKenna (died June 4, 1875) was an Irish-American Roman Catholic prelate and first parish priest and from 1868 to 1875 of The old parish of St. Rose of Lima in the Manhattan, New York. He was connected with the Irish nationalist cause, and reputedly helped the escape of Thomas D'Arcy Etienne Hughes McGee (1825–1868).

== Biography ==
Father McKenna was born in Ireland and was ordained at Maynooth College. He was an Irish Catholic priest during the Irish Famine and served as a priest in Ireland for fourteen years. His first trip to America was to raise funds for the building of a suitable church in his native Irish city. When he did immigrate to New York, he became the assistant pastor at New York's Saint Mary's Church. The Lower East Side parish was predominately Irish and soon overcrowded, which resulted in the 1868 establishment of The old parish of St. Rose of Lima where he opened a small chapel on February 9, 1868. He and the Rev. William Starrs, V.G., laid the cornerstone for a larger church on the adjoining lot July 31, 1871, which was dedicated April 23, 1871, by Archbishop John McCloskey in the name of St. Rose of Lima. He died June 4, 1875, in New York as pastor. At his funeral sermon, Rev. Michael J. O'Farrell, pastor of St. Peter's Church (New York City) said of him:

Not alone the old traditions made him loyal as a soldier of Christ but he was particularly so because of the memories infused into his heart by the dear old Irish mother whom he loved so well and whose greatest joy and hope was to see the child of her heart consecrated to the Lord.... and that too, when, to become a priest meant to be a candidate for martyrdom.... But the Irish priest was not alone true to the cause of religion; he was also true to the cause of his country. I know myself that Magee, one of the exiles of '48, one of the bravest and best among them, owed his escape to him who now lies stiff and cold in death before us. Were it not for Rev. Father McKenna, he might have passed the remainder of his days in a dungeon.... No matter where we go, we can look back to those old Irish priests at home, whose nationality and religious feelings were never separated.

The eulogy appears to link Fr. McKenna to the Irish nationalist cause, and these actions would not be unusual for many mid-nineteenth-century Irish prelates.
