= Joseph Hubert McGuire =

American architect

Joseph H. McGuire
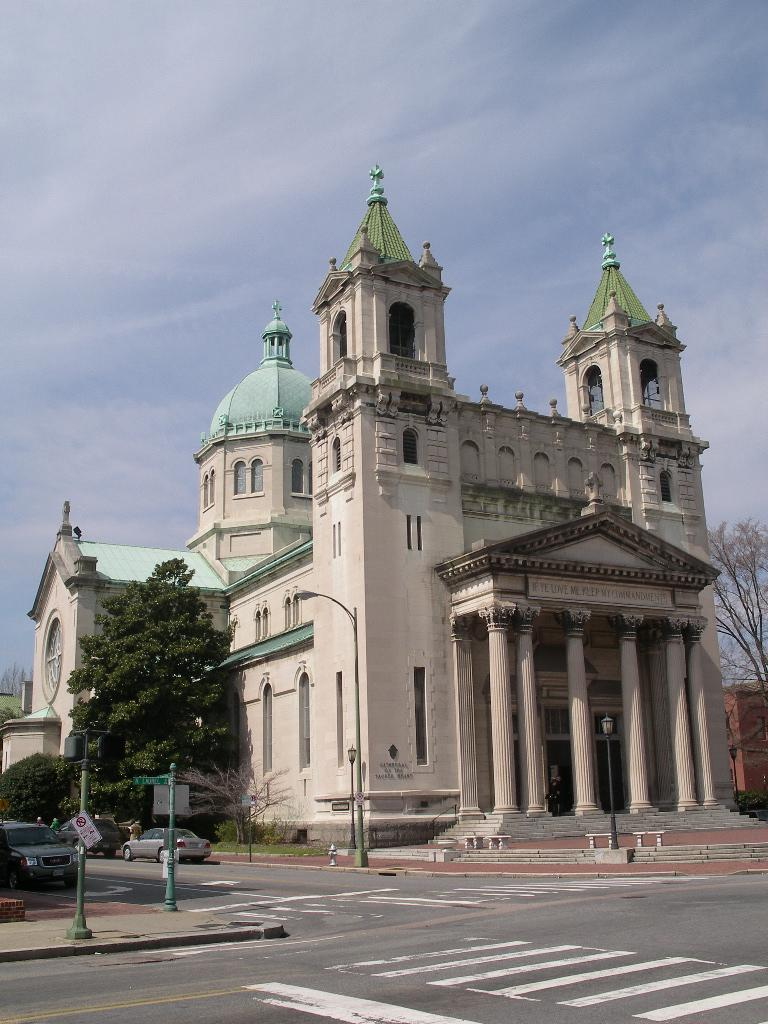
- Cathedral of the Sacred Heart, Richmond Virginia; McGuire's Masterpiece
- Born: January 21, 1866; New York City
- Died: April 28, 1947; Pelham, NY
- Known for: Joseph H. McGuire, architect

Joseph Hubert McGuire (January 21, 1866 — April 28, 1947) was an American architect practicing in New York City, where he specialized in Catholic churches and institutions. According to his headstone, McGuire was born January 21, 1865, although all other sources indicate 1866. (Gate of Heaven Cemetery, Hawthorne, NY)

== Early life and education ==
He was born in New York in 1866 to Joseph and Catherine Rorke McGuire. He was privately educated and studied at St. Francis College, the Metropolitan Art School, and the École des Beaux-Arts in Paris. McGuire's training at the École des Beaux-Arts in Paris made him a deft practitioner in the Beaux-Arts styles.

== Architectural practice ==
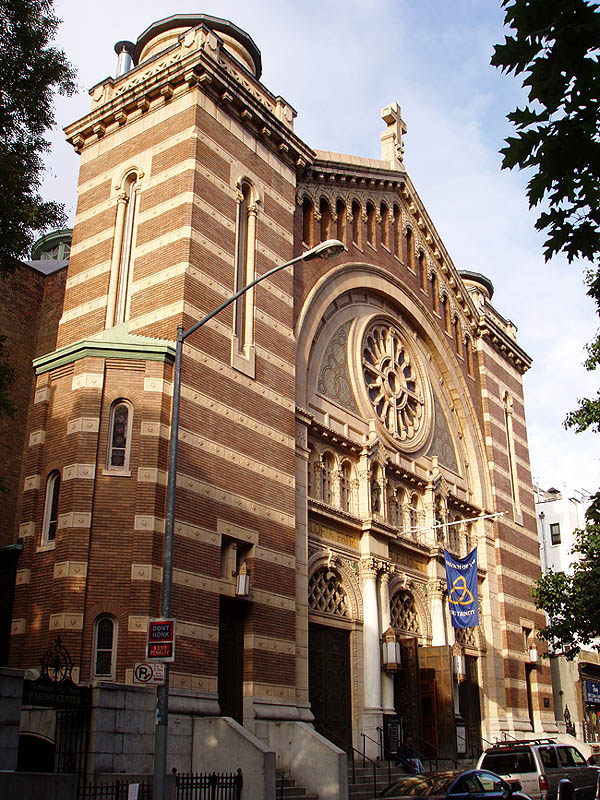
Holy Trinity, Upper West Side

His Holy Trinity Church (1910–12) on West 82nd Street in New York's Upper West Side, has a dome of Guastavino tile. According to Frederick D. Talor in his article "Medieval New York – Holy Trinity Church", the church was built deliberately in the Byzantine style, unusual for the time, and has been "considered to be one of the finest examples of Byzantine architecture in this country."

He also designed Saint Malachy's Roman Catholic Church on West 49th Street in the theater district and St. Rose of Lima Church (Manhattan).

McGuire's most prominent commission, however, was the Cathedral of the Sacred Heart in Richmond, Virginia (1903–06). He was chosen as architect for this cathedral by philanthropist Thomas Fortune Ryan who provided much of the funding for the construction and with whom McGuire had previously collaborated to build the Church of the Sacred Heart in Manchester (now part of Richmond). The Virginia Landmarks Register states that the cathedral is "a glorious celebration of Roman Catholic art and architecture" and also mentions that the original plans for the building are preserved in Richmond's Valentine Museum.

Among his commissions for schools, hospitals, commercial buildings and some residences were the designs for the chapel and assembly hall at Westchester Protectory and St Elizabeth's Hospital, New York.

== Personal life ==
McGuire married Harriet Mein in Philadelphia; they had four children. He maintained an office at 171 Broadway, then, on East 42nd St., and later at Columbus Circle. The McGuires resided in New Rochelle. McGuire served in France for nine months in the first World War as the secretary of the Knights of Columbus.

He was the author of several articles published in brochure form between 1919 and 1932.

He was a member of the AIA, Society of Beaux-Arts Architects, Architectural League of New York, New Rochelle Board of Education, The United States Catholic Historical Society, and other organizations.

== Other significant works include ==
- Church of the Sacred Heart (Richmond, Virginia) (also funded by Ryan, built prior to the cathedral)
- Church of the Holy Family (New Rochelle, New York)
- Sacred Heart Church, Suffern, NY
- Holy Trinity Church (Manhattan)
- St. Stephen of Hungary Church (New York City)
- St. Rose of Lima Church, New York City
- St. Joseph’s Institute Chapel at Throgs Neck
