= St. Rose of Lima Church (Manhattan) =

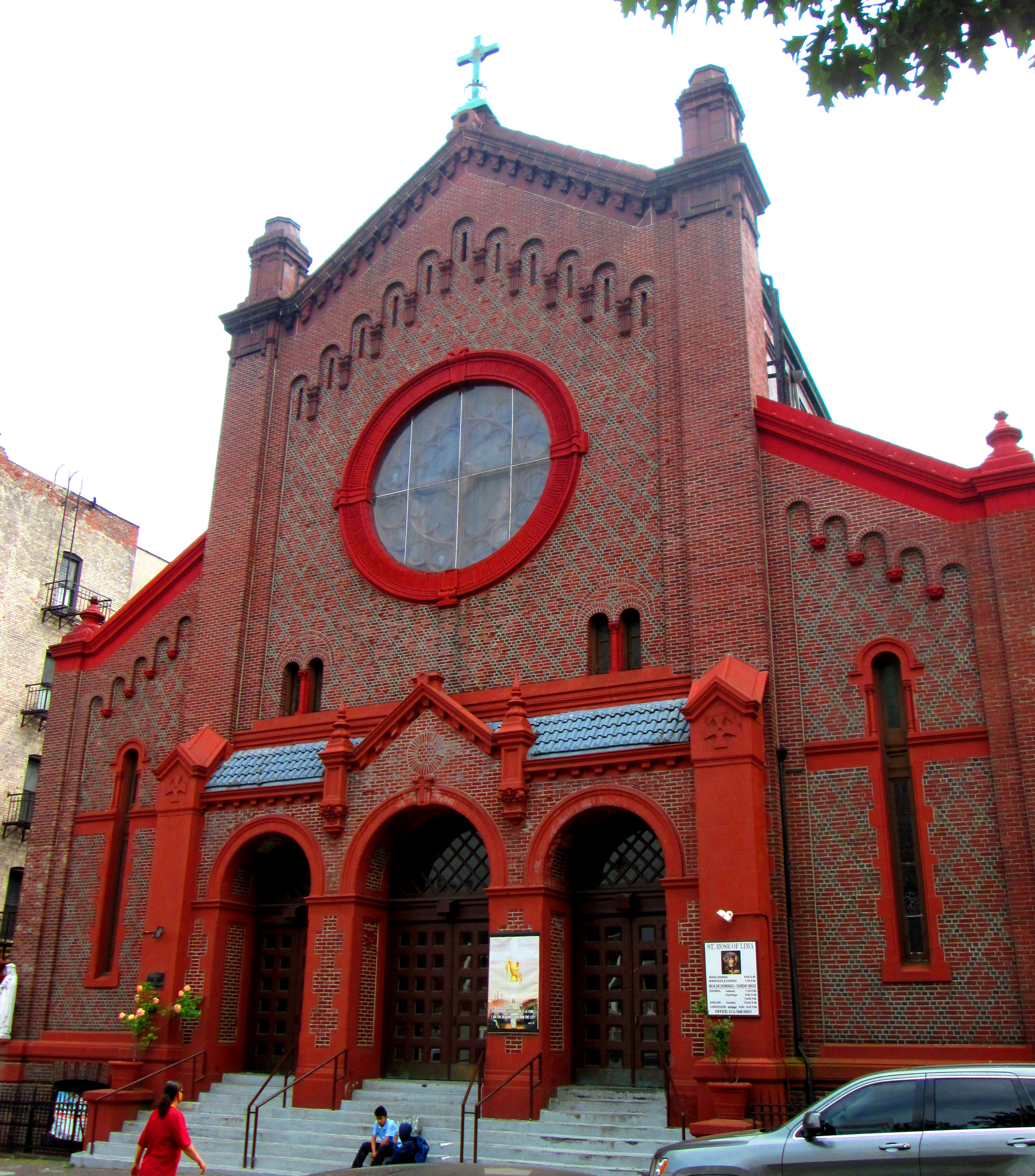
- (2014)
- Interactive map of the St. Rose of Lima Church area

General information
- Architectural style: Romanesque Revival
- Location: New York, New York, United States
- Coordinates: 40°50′16.7″N 73°56′21″W
- Construction started: 1902 (for church); 1903 (for rectory); 1924 (for parish school and convent)
- Completed: December 10, 1905 (for church); March 19, 1904 (for rectory)
- Cost: $70,000 (for 1902 church); $16,000 (for 1903 rectory); $250,000 (for 1924 parish school); $75,000 (for 1924 convent)
- Client: Roman Catholic Archdiocese of New York

Technical details
- Structural system: Masonry brick

Design and construction
- Architects: Joseph H. McGuire (for 1902 church and 1903 rectory); Robert J. Reiley (for 1924 parish school and convent)

Website
- www.stroseoflimachurchnyc.org
- St. Rose of Lima Church

Clergy
- Pastor: Rev. Ramon Lopez

The Church of St. Rose of Lima is a Roman Catholic parish church in the Roman Catholic Archdiocese of New York, located at 510 West 165th Street between Audubon and Amsterdam Avenues in the Washington Heights neighborhood of Manhattan, New York City. The Romanesque Revival church was designed by Joseph H. McGuire and built in 1902–05.

== Parish history ==
The parish was established in July 1901 by the Most Rev. Michael A. Corrigan, Archbishop of New York. A parish in Manhattan had already been dedicated to St. Rose of Lima in 1868, and another existed in Parkville, Brooklyn. Upon this parish's founding, the now demolished Old St. Rose of Lima's Church on the Lower East Side was simply known as St. Rose's to distinguish itself from this parish. The current pastor of St. Rose of Lima Church is Reverend Ramón López. Currently, there are no parochial vicars at St. Rose of Lima Church.

== Buildings ==
Corrigan had the double-height brick and stone Romanesque Revival-styke church built in 1902–1905 to designs by architect Joseph H. McGuire for $70,000. Cardinal Farley dedicated the structure on December 10, 1905. Next door, a four-story and basement brick-and-stone rectory was built in 1903–1904 to the designs by the same architect for $16,000. This building was completed and blessed by Msgr. Lavelle, V.G., on March 19, 1904.

The site for the school at 1086 St. Nicholas Avenue at West 164th Street was secured around 1904. A four-story brick parish school was built by the Rt. Rev. P. J. Hayes in 1924-25 to designs by architect Robert J. Reiley for $250,000. At the same time, at 511 West 164th Street, a four-story brick convent was built to designs by the same architect for $75,000. Today, the convent is the location of the Centro Altagracia de Fe y Justicia, a Roman Catholic agency dedicated to faith and social justice.

== Pastors ==
- Rev. Edward T. McGinley (1901-c.1913), first pastor
- Rev. Edward J. McCue (c.1913-?), assisted in 1914 by the Revs. D.M. Dyer, Daniel M. Dougherty, and Edward J. Tracy.
- Rev. Msgr. John R. Mahoney, D.D., third pastor
- Rev. Edward Russell (?-2017)
- Rev. Ramón López (2017-present)

== St. Rose of Lima Parish School ==
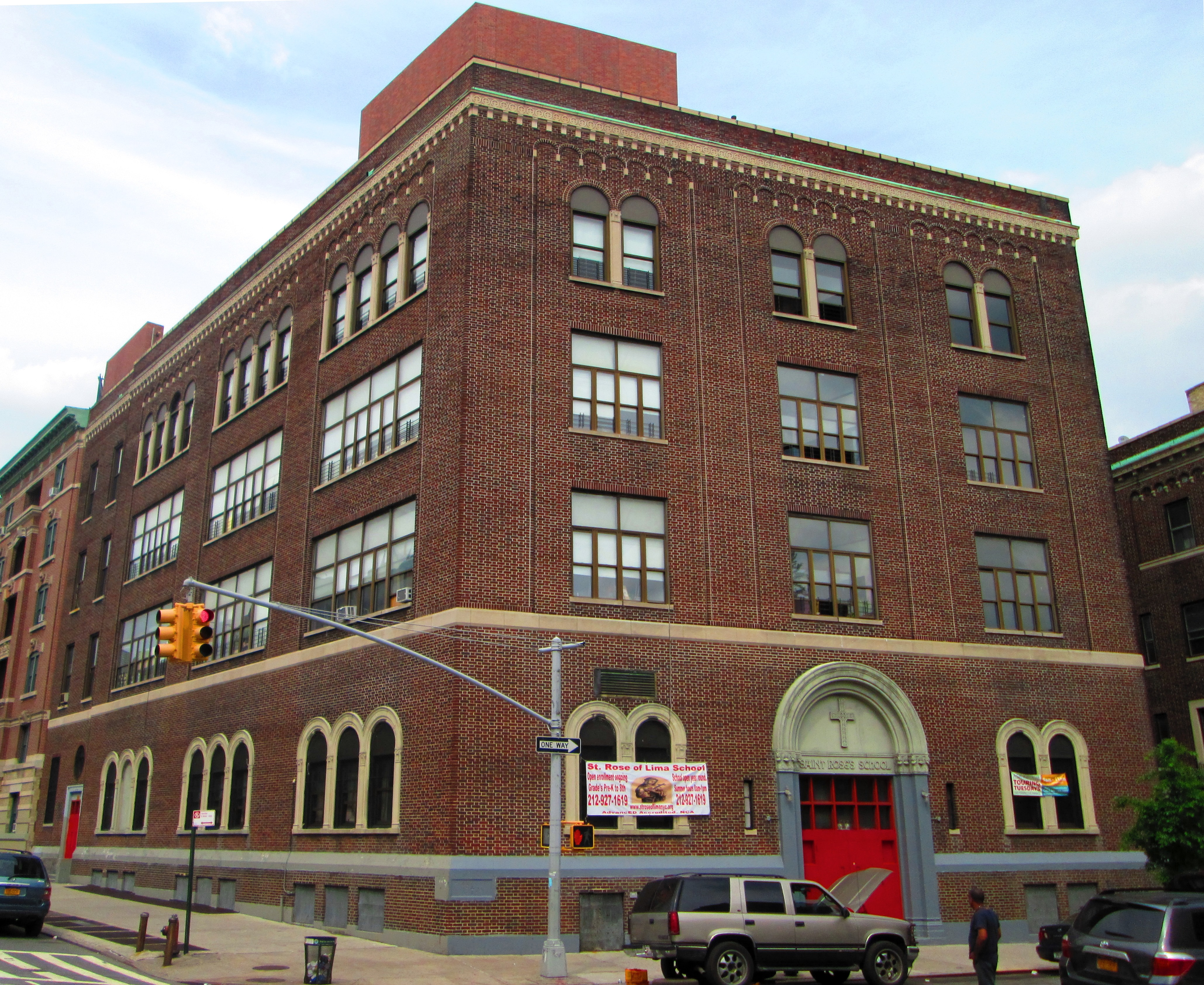
The parish school (2014)

The earliest parish schools were located at 1090 St. Nicholas Avenue and then at the Triangle Building on West 163rd Street and Amsterdam. On January 5, 1922, the Rev. Msgr. John R. Mahoney announced the building of the first modern parish school, at its current location, 1086 St. Nicholas Avenue on the corner of West 164th Street. The building's cornerstone was set in place on July 13, 1924, and construction complete in 1925. The new school was blessed on November 15, 1925. The principal at St. Rose of Lima School before it closed was Mr. Joseph J. De Bona. St. Rose of Lima School was located at 517 West 164th Street, Washington Heights, New York, New York, 10032. The Archdiocese of New York announced that St. Rose of Lima was one of the schools that closed in June 2019.

The early schools had used nuns from the Ursulines of the Blessed Virgin from the Our Lady of Lourdes parish nearby, but they were unable to provide a sufficient number of teachers, so four nuns from the Sisters of St. Dominic in Sparkill, New York came to New York City at the request of Mahoney.
