= Church of the Holy Agony (New York City) =

Former Roman Catholic church in New York City

The Church of the Holy Agony
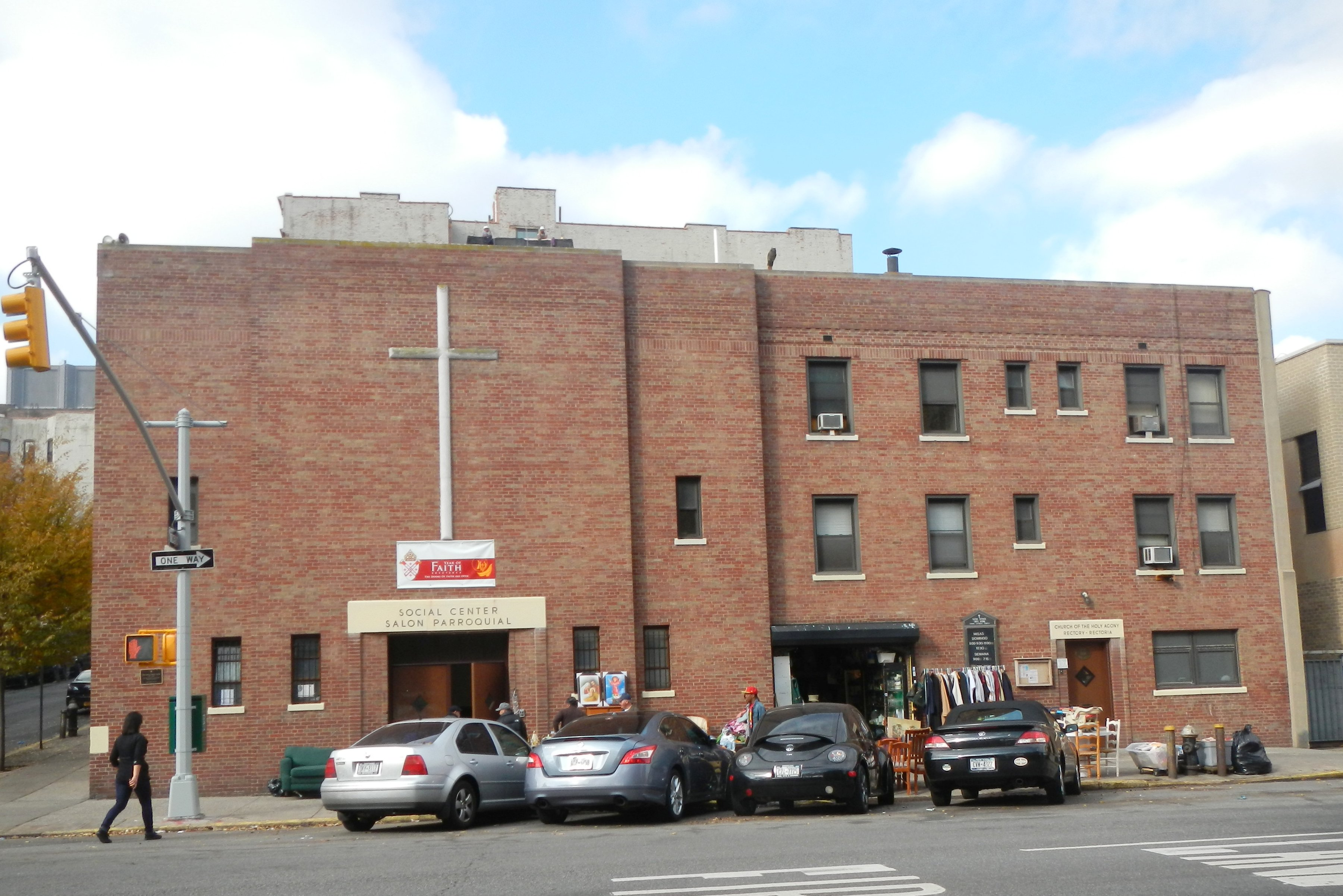
- Community House and Rectory
- Interactive map of the The Church of the Holy Agony area

General information
- Location: Manhattan, New York, United States
- Coordinates: 40°47′18.95″N 73°56′49.68″W
- Construction started: 1952
- Cost: $250,000
- Client: Roman Catholic Archdiocese of New York

Design and construction
- Architect: Robert J. Reiley of 45 West 45th Street

The Church of the Holy Agony was a Roman Catholic parish church in the Roman Catholic Archdiocese of New York, located at 1834 Third Avenue and 101st Street, in the East Harlem section of Manhattan, New York City. The parish was established in 1930 as a mission of Our Lady of the Miraculous Medal. The parish is staffed by the Vincentian Fathers.

In November 2014, the Archdiocese announced that the Church of the Holy Agony was one of 31 neighborhood parishes which would be merged into other parishes. Holy Agony was to be merged into the Church of St. Cecilia at 125 East 105th Street.

The church was deconsecrated on June 30, 2017, and in December 2022, it was given a demolition sentence and subsequently demolished. As of August 2026, a retail space for lease exists in its place.

== Buildings ==
A church and rectory at 1828-1834 Third Avenue was built in 1952 to the designs of architect Robert J. Reiley of 45 West 45th Street for $250,000.
