= Church of the Holy Family (New Rochelle, New York) =

- Church of the Holy Family
- 40°55′26.7″N 73°47′28″W
- Location: 83 Clove Road, New Rochelle, New York
- Denomination: Roman Catholic
- Website: www.holy-family-church.com

History
- Founded: 1913
- Dedication: Holy Family
- Dedicated: 1917

Administration
- Archdiocese: Archdiocese of New York

Clergy
- Pastor: Msgr. Dennis Keane

The Church of the Holy Family is a Roman Catholic parish located in New Rochelle, New York, United States. Founded in 1913, the Church of the Holy Family has undergone expansion and re-construction of its physical church over the years. The church is ethnically and linguistically diverse, reflecting the demographics of its surrounding area, as it draws considerable numbers of Caribbean, Southeast Asian, African, and Italian parishioners. As of 2013, the church served around 1,200 families and educated 380 children in grades four through seven in religious education programs.

== History ==
The Church of the Holy Family was founded in 1913 as an independent parish in response to overcrowding at St. Gabriel's Church and a growing Catholic population of Irish and Germans in the North End of New Rochelle, which was then predominantly farmland. At the time of its establishment, the church had no dedicated physical structure. The inaugural pastor, Fr. Andrew Roche, celebrated mass in a former butcher shop and lived at the College of New Rochelle, traveling back and forth by foot.

The church was designed by New Rochelle resident, architect Joseph Hubert McGuire. In 1915, construction on a dedicated church building began and was completed by 1916. The church was dedicated in 1917. The first mass celebrated in the new building was a midnight Christmas mass, as prior to that, masses were being held in the basement of the building under construction.

The Holy Family School was opened in 1921 for first and second grade students in the basement of the church, with pews used to form a makeshift classroom. Students were taught by Dominican Sisters. A purpose-built school was opened in 1922 above the church with eight classrooms and was gradually expanded as enrollment increased. The 1970s saw the Holy Family School reach its highest enrollment of approximately 900 students. Thereafter, student enrollment declined and the school was closed in 2005. The school reopened in 2018, but was closed again in June 2020 due to financial issues related to the COVID-19 pandemic.

In September 2021, a 17th-century painting of the Holy Family and John the Bapstist, painted by Italian artist, Cesare Dandini, was discovered inside the church by an art history professor from nearby Iona College.
