= Cajetan J. B. Baumann =

American architect

- Born: 3 August 1899; Grünkraut, Kingdom of Württemberg, German Empire
- Died: 9 May 1969 (aged 69); New York City
- Occupation: Architect

Brother Cajetan J. B. Baumann O.F.M. AIA (3 August 1899 – 9 May 1969) was a Franciscan friar and a noted American architect. Baumann’s designs were incredibly progressive, providing modern interpretations of Gothic architecture.

== Life ==
Baumann was born 3 August 1899 in Grünkraut, a town in the Ravensburg district of the Kingdom of Württemberg in the German Empire. He spent two years in military service during World War I, mostly with the engineering corps of the German Imperial Army. In 1922 he entered the novitiate of the Fulda Province of the Order of Friars Minor in Sigmaringen, where, upon completion, he was given the religious habit and the name by which he is now known on 16 July 1923. He remained a member of this Province throughout his life.

In 1925 Baumann was sent to the United States to help with his skills as a cabinetmaker and wood carver. It was there that he made his final profession at St. Bonaventure Friary in Paterson, New Jersey on 16 July 1926. He served that community for the next ten years. He then went on to earn a bachelor's degree from St. Bonaventure University in 1941 and a Master of Science from Columbia University, where he later served on the Board of Governors of the School of Architecture. He was also active in the National Committee on Religious Buildings, the Architectural League of New York, the National Sculpture Society, the New York Building Congress and the National Council of Architectural Registration Boards. Baumann was the American representative of the International Commission for the Restoration of the Basilica of the Holy Sepulcher in Jerusalem.

Baumann became the first member of a religious Order ever to be named to the American Institute of Architects. He also gained The National Council Certificate, which qualified him as an architect throughout the United States. With those honors, he headed an architectural firm based in New York City for the Order of Friars Minor, the Office of Franciscan Art and Architecture, designing many religious structures around the hemisphere.

On the 9 May 1969, Baumann died from a heart condition at University Hospital in New York City. Before his death, he had been awarded honorary degrees from St. Bonaventure University, St. Francis College, Biddeford, Maine, and Rosary Hill College (now Daemen College), Buffalo, New York. During his lifetime, he designed many structures, including churches, convents, schools, college residences, retreat houses, and seminaries.

== Legacy ==
Although it was not engaged in general practice, Baumann’s firm attracted a number of architects and designers who later earned national reputations. These included: Paul Damaz, the Office's Chief Designer, who helped design the United Nations headquarters in New York and received the Arnold Brunner Award in 1958; and Gottfried Bohm, who received the coveted Pritzker Prize in 1986 – architecture's highest honor.

== Completed works ==
- 1949: St. Clare's Hospital Nurses School, a seven-story brick nurses school, 426-432 West 52nd Street, Manhattan, New York, for $750,000.
- 1955: Order of St Basil the Great Nurses School, a five-story school with penthouse convent, 215 East 6th Street, Manhattan, New York, for $1,500,000.
- 1959: St. Mary's Ruthenian Catholic Church, three-story church & rectory, 244-246 E 15th Street, Manhattan, New York, for $450,000.
- 1959-61 Immaculate Conception Seminary (Troy, New York), multiple component addition to earlier monastery complex, including four-story classroom building, auditorium. ("Breaking Ground," The Times Record, 21 September 1959, 15)
- 1960: St. Stephen of Hungary's Church (New York City), four-story rectory, 402-412 E 82nd Street, Manhattan, New York, for $300,000.
- 1962: Our Lady of Florida Passionist Monastery and Retreat House, two-story, 1300 US Hwy 1 North Palm Beach Florida
- 1965: Holy Cross Church (Bronx, New York), 600 Soundview Avenue, Bronx, New York
- 1966: St. John's Atonement Seminary, Montour Falls, New York, a new annex
- St. Bonaventure University, Saint Bonaventure, New York:
  - Plassman Hall
  - Friary (now Doyle Hall)
  - Christ the King Seminary (now Francis Hall)
  - University Administration Building (now Hopkins Hall)
- St. Anthony Shrine, Boston, MA
- Daemen College, Amherst, New York
  - Marian Library (now Haberman Gacioch Center for Visual & Performing Arts)
  - Daemen Hall (now MusicalFare Theatre)
  - Duns Scouts Hall

== External sources ==
Bruder Cajetan Baumann, Architekt in New York by Dorotheus Naumann (1966)
