= Church of the Sacred Heart (Richmond, Virginia) =

Historic church in Virginia, United States

- The Church of the Sacred Heart
- U.S. National Register of Historic Places
- Virginia Landmarks Register
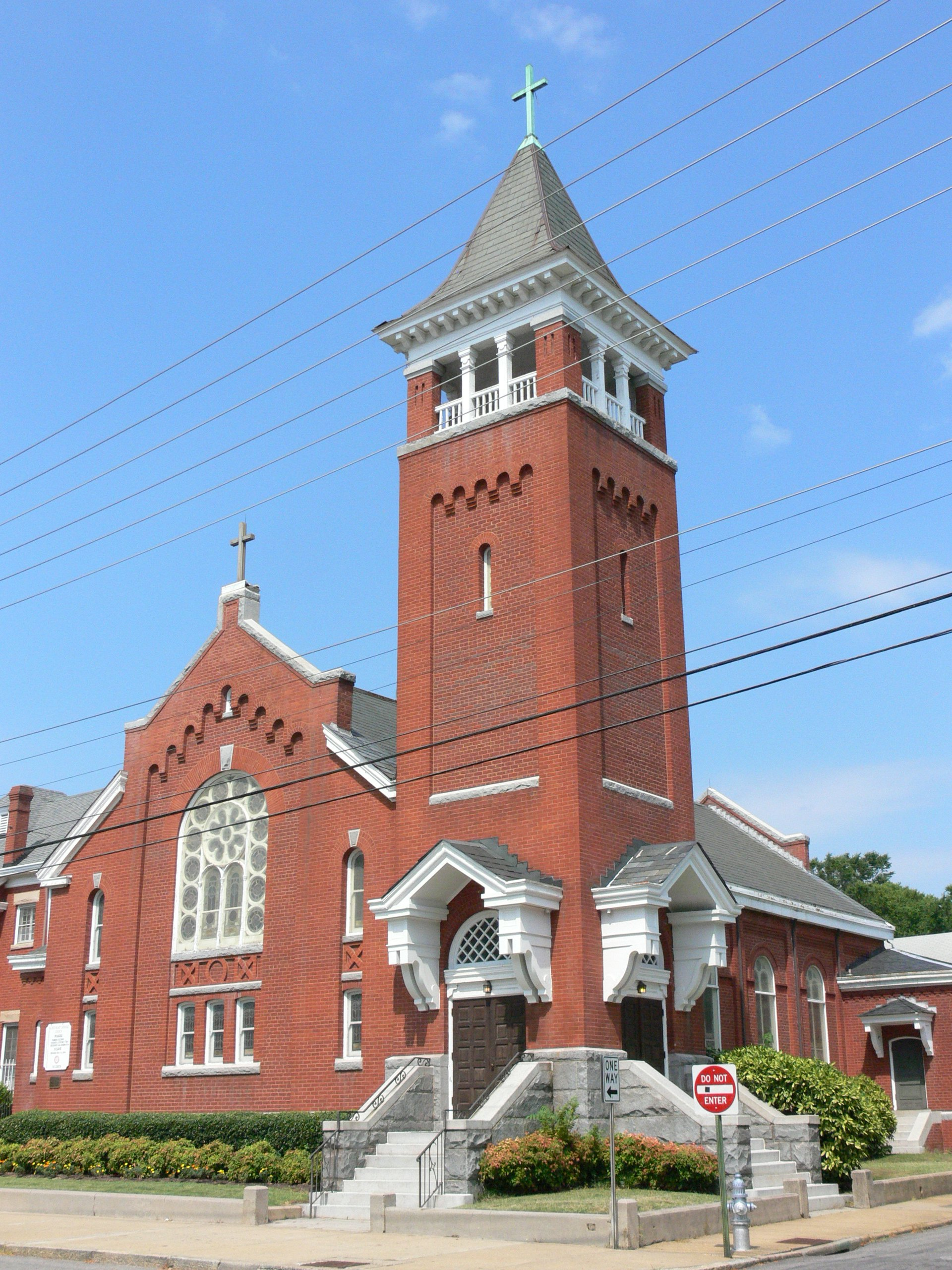
- The Church of the Sacred Heart in 2011.

- Location within Virginia Location within the United States
- Location: 1401 Perry St., Richmond, Virginia
- Coordinates: 37°31′21″N 77°26′57″W
- Area: 0.7 acres (0.28 ha)
- Built: 1901
- Architect: McGuire, Joseph Hubert, Sitterding, Fritz
- Architectural style: Renaissance
- NRHP reference No.: 02001368
- VLR No.: 127-0676

Significant dates
- Added to NRHP: November 20, 2002
- Designated VLR: September 11, 2002

The Church of the Sacred Heart, is a Catholic church in Richmond, Virginia that was built in 1901. The congregation was initially Irish and German.

It was listed on the National Register of Historic Places in 2002.

== History ==
In 1901 Sacred Heart Church, designed by Joseph Hubert McGuire, was built using funding provided by Ida Mary Barry Ryan on land purchased in 1876 by Bishop James Gibbons. Ryan and her husbland would later fund construction of the Cathedral of the Sacred Heart. The first pastor was Rev. Thomas J. Waters.

The parish hosts the South Richmond conference of the Society of Saint Vincent de Paul.
