= St. Andrew Church (Manhattan) =

Catholic church in Manhattan, New York

Coordinates: 40°42′47.9″N 74°0′10.1″W

St. Andrew's Church
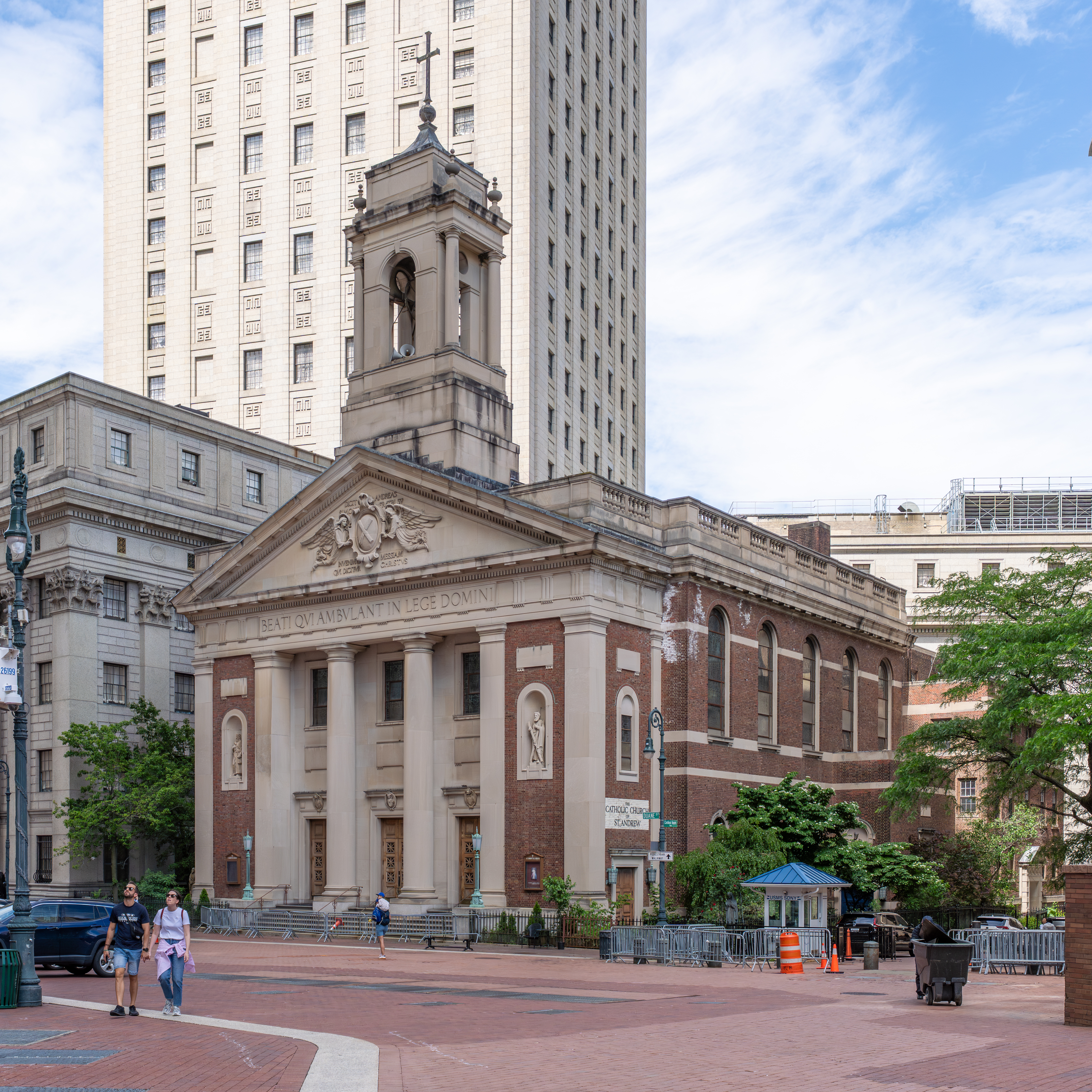
- (2026)

General information
- Location: New York, New York, United States of America
- Completed: 1939
- Cost: $632,153
- Client: Roman Catholic Archdiocese of New York

Design and construction
- Architects: Maginnis & Walsh, Robert J. Reiley

The Church of St. Andrew is a Roman Catholic parish church in the Roman Catholic Archdiocese of New York, located at 20 Cardinal Hayes Place, Manhattan, New York City. It was established in 1842. The present building was erected in 1939 through a joint effort involving Maginnis & Walsh and Robert J. Reiley in the Georgian Revival architectural style.

In August 2015 St. Andrew's parish merged with that of Our Lady of Victory on William Street to form the Parish of Our Lady of Victory and St. Andrew. In 2020(?), St. Andrew's Church was closed to the public when the Sisters of Life were given the building. In 2023, both parishes were merged with St. Peter's Church at 22 Barclay Street.

== History ==
St. Andrew's parish was founded by Rev. Andrew Byrne. Local Catholics had purchased the old Universalist Church, known as Carroll Hall, which then Bishop John Hughes dedicated on March 19, 1842. In 1844, Byrne was named the first bishop of the Diocese of Little Rock. In 1858 extensive street improvements carried away so much of the old structure that it was found necessary to purchase the adjoining lot. According to Remigius Lafort, George Washington once dwelt in a house on this site. The remodeled St. Andrew's was dedicated October 20, 1861.

On February 25, 1875, during a Lenten service at which about 1200 worshippers were assembled, the building next to the church suddenly collapsed. As a result, the roof of Saint Andrew's caved in on those gathered, killing five and injuring at least 29.

=== "Printers' Mass ===
Father Luke Evers initiated the "Printers' Mass", held at 2:30 a.m. on Sunday morning. An adaptation approved by Pope Leo XIII, this allowed Catholic workers at nearby Printing House Square, where The Sun, The New York Telegram, The New York Times, and the New York World newspapers were then published, to fulfill their Sunday obligation by stopping by on their way home after the Saturday night press runs. The "Printers Mass" also drew railway workers, postal employees, policemen, firefighters, brewery and saloon workers. The practice soon spread to other cities. This tradition continued for more than 50 years, and the church became known as "The Printers' Church. Some six years later a similar accommodation would be made for the theatrical community with the establishment of the "Actors' Chapel" at St. Malachy's.

Evers was also chaplain at The Tombs.

=== Pastors ===
- Fr. Andrew Byrne, 1842-1844
- Fr. John Maginnis, 1844-1850
- Fr. Michael Curran, 1850-1880
- Fr. James McMahon, 1880-1891
- Fr. James Fitzsimmons, 1891-1898
- Fr. Luke Evers, 1898 -

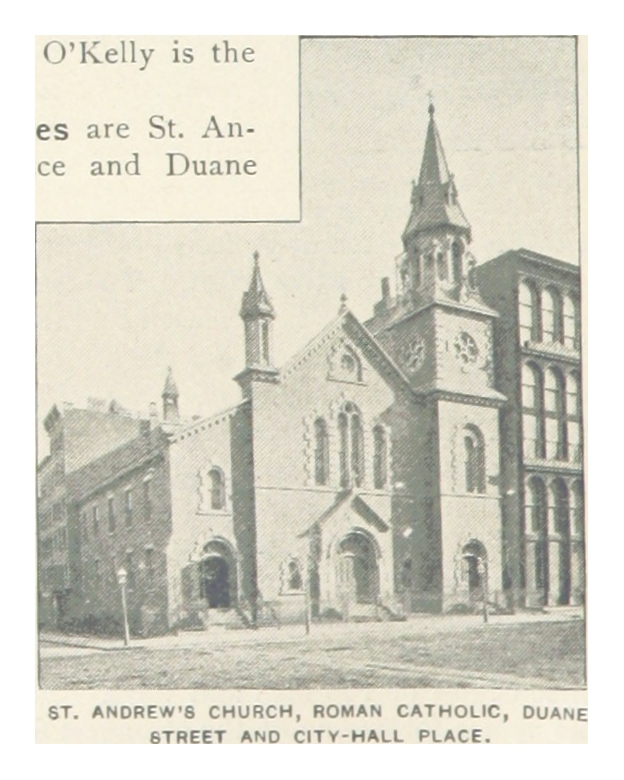
Duane Street and City Hall Place, 1893

== Description ==
In 1892, the address listed was on Duane Street at the corner of City Hall Place (now Cardinal Hayes Place). The present building was erected in 1939 through a joint effort involving the famous Boston firm Maginnis & Walsh and Robert J. Reiley of New York. It is one of the best examples of the Georgian Revival architectural style in New York. St. Andrew is the only New York City church to be designed by Maginnis & Walsh. The church was erected near the site of the infamous Five Points slum. The selection of the site for the church was near where Cardinal Hayes was born.

The church is located near New York City Hall and 1 Police Plaza, along with several other courthouses such as the New York County Courthouse and Thurgood Marshall United States Courthouse. Above the entrance to the church, an inscription in Latin reads "Beati qvi ambvlant in lege Domini," which means "Blessed are they who walk in the law of the Lord."
