= St. Rose of Lima Old Church (New York City) =

Former church in Manhattan, New York

Coordinates: 40.71636°N 73.98001°W

Old Church of St. Rose of Lima
- Interactive map of the Old Church of St. Rose of Lima area

General information
- Architectural style: Gothic Revival
- Location: Lower East Side, Manhattan, New York City, New York, United States
- Construction started: 1868 (for chapel); 1870 (for church) / July 31, 1870 (for church cornerstone)
- Completed: February 9, 1868 (for temporary chapel); April 23, 1871 (for church); 1894 (for school)
- Demolished: July 1901 (for 1871 church)
- Cost: $96,000 (for 1871 church--as reported in 1896) $150,000 (for 1871 church--as reported in 1900) $25,000 (for 1894 school, as reported in 1896) $70,000 (for 1894 school, as reported in 1900)
- Client: Roman Catholic Archdiocese of New York

Technical details
- Structural system: Brick masonry with freestone trim

The Old Church of St. Rose of Lima is a former Roman Catholic parish church which was under the authority of the Roman Catholic Archdiocese of New York, located at 36 Cannon Street between Broome Street and Delancey Street on the Lower East Side of Manhattan, New York City. The rectory was located at 42 Cannon Street; the school was located at 290 Delancey Street. The 1871 church was described by The New York Times when it opened in 1871, as one of the finest churches in the city. The church was demolished around July 1901 and the site redeveloped in conjunction with the erection of the Williamsburg Bridge (1903) and public housing. A new church was begun shortly after property was purchased in July 1900 at Grand and Lewis Streets. The parish closed in the 1960s.

== Parish history ==
The parish of St. Rose of Lima was established in 1868 out of the parish of St. Mary's Church (Manhattan) to relieve the overcrowded conditions there by that parish's assistant and acting pastor, the Rev. Michael McKenna. Fr. McKenna opened a small chapel on February 9, 1868.

A number of the prelates attached to St. Rose's parish went onto distinguished ecclesiastical careers. Rev. McKenna was an Irish prelate who first visited the U.S. to collect money for church building; he was also known to have had ties to Irish nationalism. Pastor McKenna remained here until his death in 1875, temporarily succeeded by the Rev. Patrick J. Daly, and then by the Rev. Richard Brennan later that year until he was transferred to the Church of the Holy Innocents (New York City). Thereafter, the Rev. Edward McGinley, who for many years had been assistant pastor became pastor in 1890, succeeded by the Rev. Peter McNamee, who in 1914 was assisted by the Revs. Francis J. Heaney and Christopher B. Dunlevy St. Rose's was the first New York City posting of the Rev. John J. Boyle, founding pastor of St. Luke's Church (Bronx, New York) after a stint in Goshen, New York. As reported in 1914, the parish "Catholic population numbers about 3,500, and the church property is valued at $300,000, with no debt."

The church had strong ties to Ireland and Irish politics. Apart from its first pastor, The New York Times reported in 1886 that the church had raised $800 to assist the Irish national leader Charles Stewart Parnell, who was then just beginning to deal with the divorce scandal that would cost him his political career and force him to live in exile. Parnell was abandoned by the Irish church but remained very popular with lay Irish Catholics. Here in New York, lay Irish Catholics held the fundraiser for him in the church, itself.

Among the many colorful events in the social history of the parish was the establishment of the Young Men's Catholic Society, led by the Rev. Dr. Brennan, pastor, which in 1886 was reported to have had a picnic disrupted by misbehaved youths.

Construction of the Williamsburg Bridge, which opened in 1903, destroyed much of the original parish's housing, including the church, rectory, and school. As early as the 1890s, it was assumed that the parish would be merged back into that of St. Mary's. The uncertainty of the parish's survival led in 1905 to a newly established uptown parish on West 165th Street being also dedicated to St. Rose of Lima. Hence, after 1905, St. Rose of Lima's Church (Manhattan) referred to the new parish at West 165th Street, and this parish was simply known as St. Rose's, or Old St. Rose's. The renaming seemed to indicate that the original parish was likely to be disbanded or perhaps even that this was a foregone conclusion. Before the new uptown parish was built, plans to rebuild the displaced parish church were begun in July 1900 with the purchase of property nearby at Grand and Lewis Streets, still named St. Rose of Lima (until the uptown parish was founded), which continued throughout the early to mid twentieth century.

This rebuilt parish church continued to operate until finally closing in the 1960s. The parish records are held at St. Mary's.

== Buildings ==
Services were originally held in a small chapel erected on the site and in use from 1868 to 1871. The Rev. Michael McKenna and the Rev. William Starrs, Vicar General, laid the cornerstone for a larger church on the adjoining lot July 31, 1870, which was dedicated April 23, 1871 by Archbishop John McCloskey in the name of St. Rose of Lima. The church reportedly cost $96,000 and had a seating capacity of 1,300, as was reported in 1896. The cost of the structure and seating capacity increased to $150,000 and 2,000 as reported in 1900. This was perhaps influenced by increased value or inflated figures for the relocation restitution (a similar increase is reported for the school).

The Rev. Hecker preached the first sermon in the church during the dedication, extolling "the church, he said, was not merely the brick and mortar of which it was composed by it was symbolical of that Church which should exist in the hearts of every true Christian." The New York Times thoroughly described the 1871 church the year it opened: "The new edifice is 120 feet by 70 feet, and 85 feet from floor to dome, and is capable of seating 1,500 persons. The interior is constructed in the pure Gothic style. On either side the roof is supported by a line of tall Gothic columns, which are joined together by high Gothic arches. The windows are of stained glass, the contributions of individual members of the congregation. The altar is built of Caen stone, and is one of the handsomest in the city. Over the altar there are two stained glass windows, one bearing the representations of St. Rose and St. Columbkill, and the other St. Patrick and St. Bridget. On the right of the high altar there is an altar devoted to St. Joseph, over which there is a large window, bearing his image, while on the left of a similar altar and window commemorates the Virgin Mary. The interior of the chancel is beautifully decorated, and the columns on either side, supporting the arch, contain Gothic niches, in which are statues of Joseph and Mary. The pews are of walnut and oak, ornamented with satin-wood, and the beautify of the design and finish harmonizes well with the entire interior, which is hardly equaled by any church in the City. The exterior of the building is of a composite style, and is built of brick, which ornaments of free-stone. On the north-west corner there is to be a tall steeple, which when completed, will be 160 feet, in height." A nearby schoolhouse, on Cannon Street, fronting Delancy Street, was completed in 1894 and cost $25,000.

As reported in 1896, the church and school, which were referred to as neighborhood "landmarks," were to be demolished to make way for the new East River Bridge development (the initial name of what became the Williamsburg Bridge), which intended to clear "nearly all of the buildings in the blocks below Delancey Street between the East River and Clinton Street." "The schoolhouse, which was built in comparatively recent years, will also have to be torn down." The parish was expected to be merged with St. Mary's during this turmoil. The structures were still there by the end of the century, as when Father McGinley celebrated his Silver Jubilee in 1898 at the Cannon Street church, which listed a procession as starting from the school hall at 290 Delancey Street.

Due to the imminent demolition caused by the Williamsburg Bridge, the Trustees of the Church of St. Rose de Lima, purchased property in July 1900 at Grand and Lewis Streets for $58,000. It was reported that "ground for the erection of a handsome new edifice, to cost not less than $100,000, will be broken within a fortnight.” Figures cited in that article regarding the predecessor church differ dramatically (more than double) from the original reported cost of the same structures in contemporary newspaper accounts. The substantial increases either reflect an increased number value attributed to inflation, or inflated value of the property by assessing authorities for restitution. The 1871 church was demolished around July 1901.

The stretch of Cannon Street that the 1871 church occupied is the only remaining section of Cannon Street extant, after the development of the Williamsburg Bridge (opened 1903). Apart from high-rise housing, the site also includes the elegantly detailed Beaux-Arts PS-110 building, constructed after the redevelopment of the area.

== St. Rose of Lima Parish School ==
Plans for a parochial school were begun as early as 1887, with meetings and fund-raising held in the basement of the church. The first school building was built 1894, and located on Canon Street. The school hall of the structure was located at 290 Delancey Street.

== Pastors ==
- Rev. Michael McKenna (1868–1875)
- Rev. Patrick J. Daly (1875–1875), temporary administrator
- Rev. Dr. Richard Brennan (1875–1890), until his transfer to Church of the Holy Innocents (New York City)
- Rev. Edward McGinley (1890-c.1910), who for many years had been assistant here, Rev. Michael G. Doran was transferred here (presumably as assistant) in 1904
- Rev. Peter McNamee (c.1910-?), who in 1914 was assisted by the Revs. Francis J. Heaney and Christopher B. Dunlevy
- Rev. Joseph I. Norris (?-1930), transferred to the Church of the Sacred Heart
