= Robert J. Reiley =

American architect (1878–1961)

- Born: September 26, 1878; New York City
- Died: September 7, 1961 (aged 82); Mount Kisco, New York
- Known for: Architect
- Spouse: Amanda Chatillon (m. 1911)
- Children: 3

Robert J. Reiley, AIA, (1878–1961) was an American architect practicing in New York City in the early and mid twentieth century. He was particularly known as a designer of Catholic churches, schools, and hospitals in the Northeast USA.

== Early life and architectural education ==
Reiley was born in New York City and was educated in the local public school system. He attended the prestigious Jesuit school, Xavier High School (New York City), and Columbia Grammar School, both college preparatory schools, in New York City. He graduated from the Columbia School of Architecture in 1900 and continued his alumni networking there throughout the rest of his career. Following graduation, he worked the next two years a draftsman in the office of Ernest Flagg from 1900 to 1902 and later as supervisor of construction for Van Vleck and Goldsmith from 1902 to 1903. After a period of European travel and study in Paris from 1903 to 1904, he then entered into a partnership with fellow Columbia graduate Gustave E. Steinback. The firm, known as Reiley and Steinback continued in practice from 1904 through 1913 and was responsible for many buildings for Roman Catholic clients throughout the Eastern United States. After the partnership was dissolved, both men went on to lengthy careers designing Roman Catholic churches, with Reiley's firm known as Robert J. Reiley.

== Architectural practice ==
Robert J. Reiley practiced under his own name from 1913 until 1952 when he took his son, Robert J. Reiley Jr. into partnership and renamed the firm Robert J. Reiley & Associates. His main client remained the Roman Catholic Archdiocese of New York for which he designed a number of churches and associated structures. His office was located at 50 East 41 Street from the 1920s and 45 West 45th Street in the 1950s. During his career, he was licensed to practice architecture in New York, New Jersey, Connecticut, Pennsylvania, North Carolina, and the District of Columbia. The firm had a staff of around twenty and banked with the Guaranty Trust Company, Fifth Avenue and 44th Street, New York City.

Several later noteworthy architects began their careers in his office including Louis M. Thorn and Brother Cajetan Baumann, OFM (1899–1969), a Franciscan who was to design many modern buildings mostly for Franciscan clients in the middle part of the 20th century.

== Personal life ==
Reiley was involved with a number of Catholic organizations. He was the director of the Catholic Camp Association, as well as the Alumni Federation of Columbia University, and Committee Chairman of Catholic Charities. During World War I, he worked on a housing project and during World War II, he designs hospitals and community buildings for service men. Reiley has at least one son, the architect Robert J. Reiley Jr. (born 22 March 1914 in New York City), whom he took into partnership in 1952 renaming his firm Robert J. Reiley & Associates.

== Work as Reiley and Steinback (1904-1913) ==
- St. Stanislaus Church, Adams, MA
- Church of the Queen of All Saints, Brooklyn, NY
- 1908: The Basilica of St. Stanislaus, Bishop & Martyr, Chicopee, MA
- St. Stanislaus' Church, Meriden, CT
- St. Aloysius' Church, Great Neck, LI
- 1909: Our Lady of Mt. Carmel Church, Bayonne, NJ

== Works in New York City as Robert J. Reiley (1913-1952) and Robert J. Reiley & Associates (1952-1961) ==
- 1924: St. Rose of Lima's Church Parochial School, A four-story brick parish school for $250,000.
- 1924: St. Rose of Lima's Church Convent, a four-story brick convent in 1924 for $75,000.
- 1924: Girl's Catholic School, Brooklyn, NY, cost $1,242,000.
- 1925: Cathedral High School (New York City), cost $1,200,000
- 1925: The Church of the Most Holy Crucifix (New York City), with three-story rectory, now the San Lorenzo Ruiz Chapel (New York City)
- 1925: Our Lady of Solace Church (Brooklyn, New York)
- 1925: St. Jean Baptiste's Church Parochial School, 163-173 East 75th Street, a 4-story brick school, for $300,000.
- 1927: A five-story brick dwelling house for Ascension RC Church, 218 West 108th Street for $100,000.
- 1927 Church of St. Elizabeth, (New York City)
- 1929: Catholic High School (Brooklyn, New York), Eastern Parkway and the southwest corner of Washington Avenue, designed in the Art Deco style
- 1929: Our Lady of Angels Church, Mermaid Avenue, Brooklyn, New York, cost $467,000.
- 1930: St. Jean Baptiste's Church Brothers Apartment, 194 East 76th Street, a five-story brick brothers apartment building for $70,000 to 90,000.
- 1930 Monastery of St, Claire, Throggs Neck, Bronx NY
- 1931: St. Jean Baptiste's Church Sisters Apartment, 163-175 East 75th Street and 170-198 East 76th Street and 1061-1071 Lexington Avenue, a five-storey brick sisters apartment house for $125,000.
- 1933: Saints Peter and Paul's Church (Bronx, New York), cost 515,500.
- 1933: Church of Our Lady of Guadalupe (Brooklyn, New York), cost $155,000.
- 1936: Church of the Epiphany Rectory, 239 East 21st Street, a four-storey brick rectory for $50,000.
- 1936: Keating Hall, Fordham University, Rosehill Campus, Fordham, Bronx, New York, cost $1,050,000.

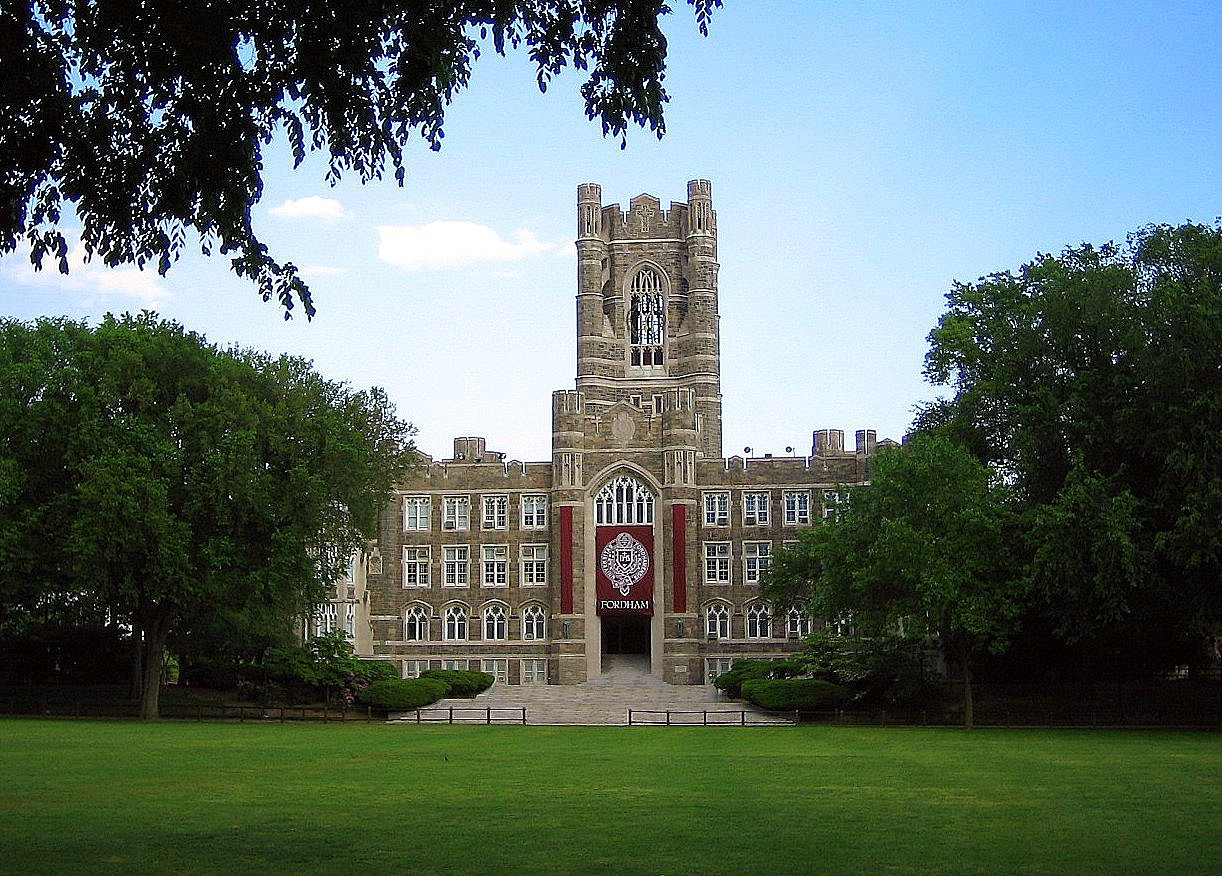
Keating Hall with Edwards Parade in the foreground (Rose Hill campus).

- 1939: St. Benedict Joseph School (Queens, New York), in Richmond Hills, Queens, New York City, cost $271,000.
- 1939-1941: St. Andrew's Church (New York City), Police Plaza, Lower East Side, Manhattan, associate architect, designed with Maginnis & Walsh, (one of their only known church buildings in New York City), cost $632,153

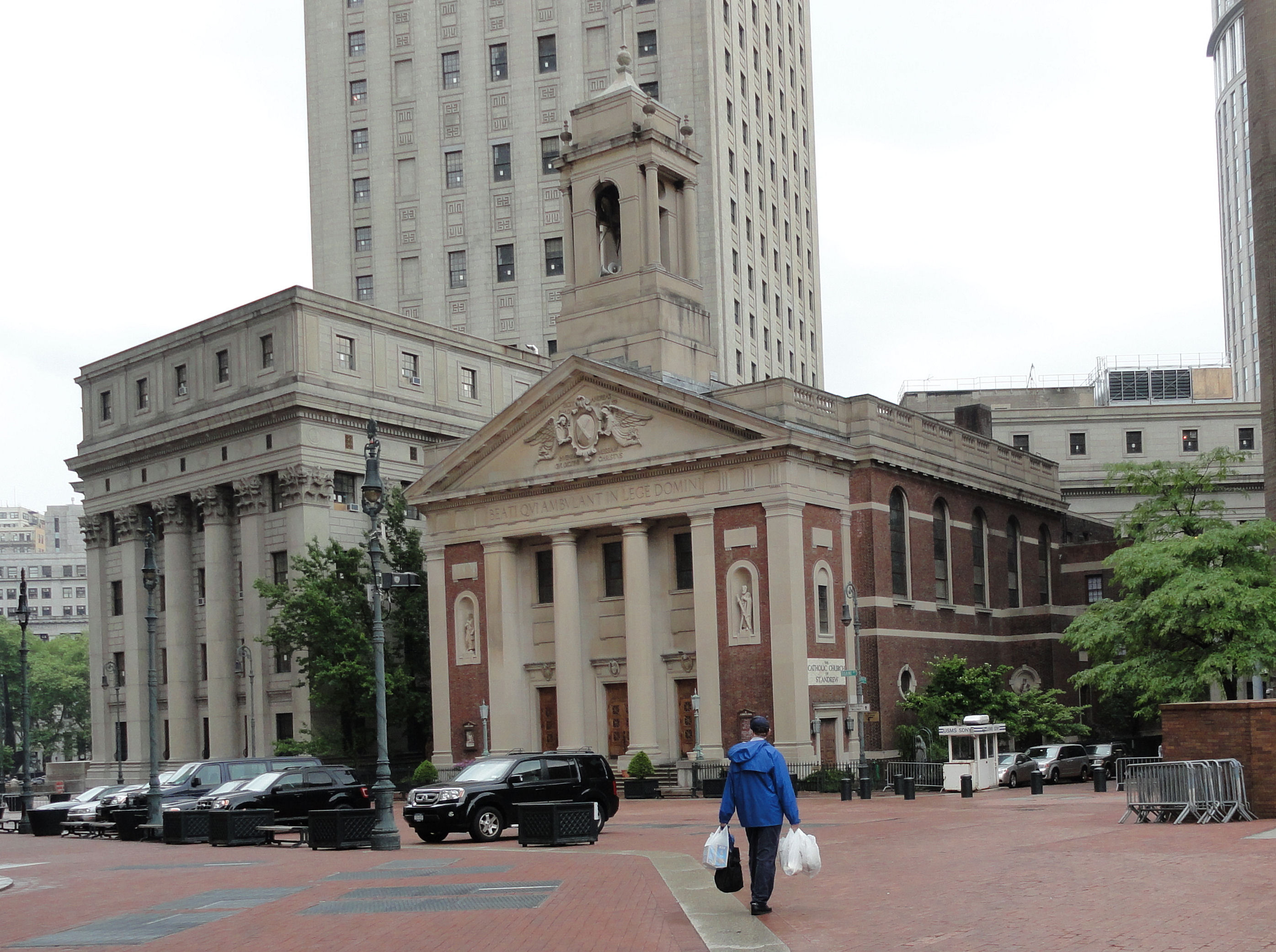
St. Andrew's Church (New York City), designed by Reiley and Maginnis and Walsh; Photographed in 2010

- 1940: Three buildings for St, Clare's Hospital (Manhattan, New York), 415 West 51st Street, New York City, cost $900,000. Also known as St. Clare's Hospital and Health Center, renamed in 2003 St. Vincent Midtown Hospital, it was closed 2007.
- 1946-1947: The James Weldon Johnson Houses (in association with Julian Whittlesey and Harry Prince) budgeted at $10 million.
- 1950: Our Lady of Perpetual Help Church, Richmond Hill, Queens, New York City, cost $363,000
- 1951: Colonial Park Houses, New York City, cost $10 million (as associate architect).
- 1952: Holy Agony Church and Rectory, 1828-1834 Third Avenue, for $250,000.
- 1952: Junior High School#71 (Manhattan, New York), Avenue B and Fifth Street, New York City, cost $3 million
- 1952: St. Ann's School (Queens, New York), Flushing, Queens, New York City cost $550,000
- 1952: Lavelle School for the Blind (Bronx, New York), cost $228,853.
- 1952 Blessed Sacrament Church, Staten Island NY
- 1952: St. Anastasius' Convent (Brooklyn, New York), cost $247,000.
- 1953 Church of St. Theresa of the Infant Jesus (Staten Island, New York), West New Brighton, Staten Island, New York City, cost $224,000.
- 1953: Church of the Blessed Sacrament (Staten Island, New York), West New Brighton, Staten Island, New York City, cost $175,000.
- 1954: St. Joseph's Church Rectory, 365-371 Sixth Avenue, a four-storey rectory for $150,000.
- 1953 Junior High School#117 (Brooklyn, New York), cost $3 million.
- St. Finbar's Community Center (Brooklyn, New York), cost $163,660.

== Works elsewhere as Robert J. Reiley (1913-1952) and Robert J. Reiley & Associates (1952-1961) ==
- 1928: Seminary of the Immaculate Conception, Huntington, NY, cost $1,664,000 to 2 million.
- 1931-1951: St. Peter's Hospital and Nurses Home (Albany, New York), cost $1,200,000 to $2,500,000.
- 1932: Nativity School and Convent (Scranton, Pennsylvania), cost $338,400.
- 1938-1939: St. Michael's Novitiate. Englewood Cliffs, NJ, cost $408,000.
- 1939: Mercy Hospital (Rockville Centre, New York), cost $350,000 to $400,000.
- 1940: St. Stephen Church, Kearny, NJ
- 1940: St. Stephen's Church (Arlington, New Jersey)
- 1951: St. Charles' Hospital (East Toledo, Ohio), cost $4 million.
- 1951: Christ the King Seminary, campus of St. Bonaventure University, Allegany, New York, cost $1 million.
- 1952: St. Mary's Convent (perth Amboy, New Jersey), cost $240,000.
- 1952: New York State Teacher's College at New Paltz Library, New Paltz, New York, cost $330,000.
- 1953: St. Vincent DePaul Church and Rectory, Yardville, NJ, cost $326,500.
- 1953: St. Agnes Church, Dayton, OH, cost $400,000.
- 1953: School, Milltown, New Jersey, cost $350,000.
- Star of the Sea Convent (Atlantic City, New Jersey), cost $90,157.
