= Holy Innocents Church (New York City) =

Coordinates: 40°45′7.85″N 73°59′17.08″W

Shrine and Parish Church of the Holy Innocents
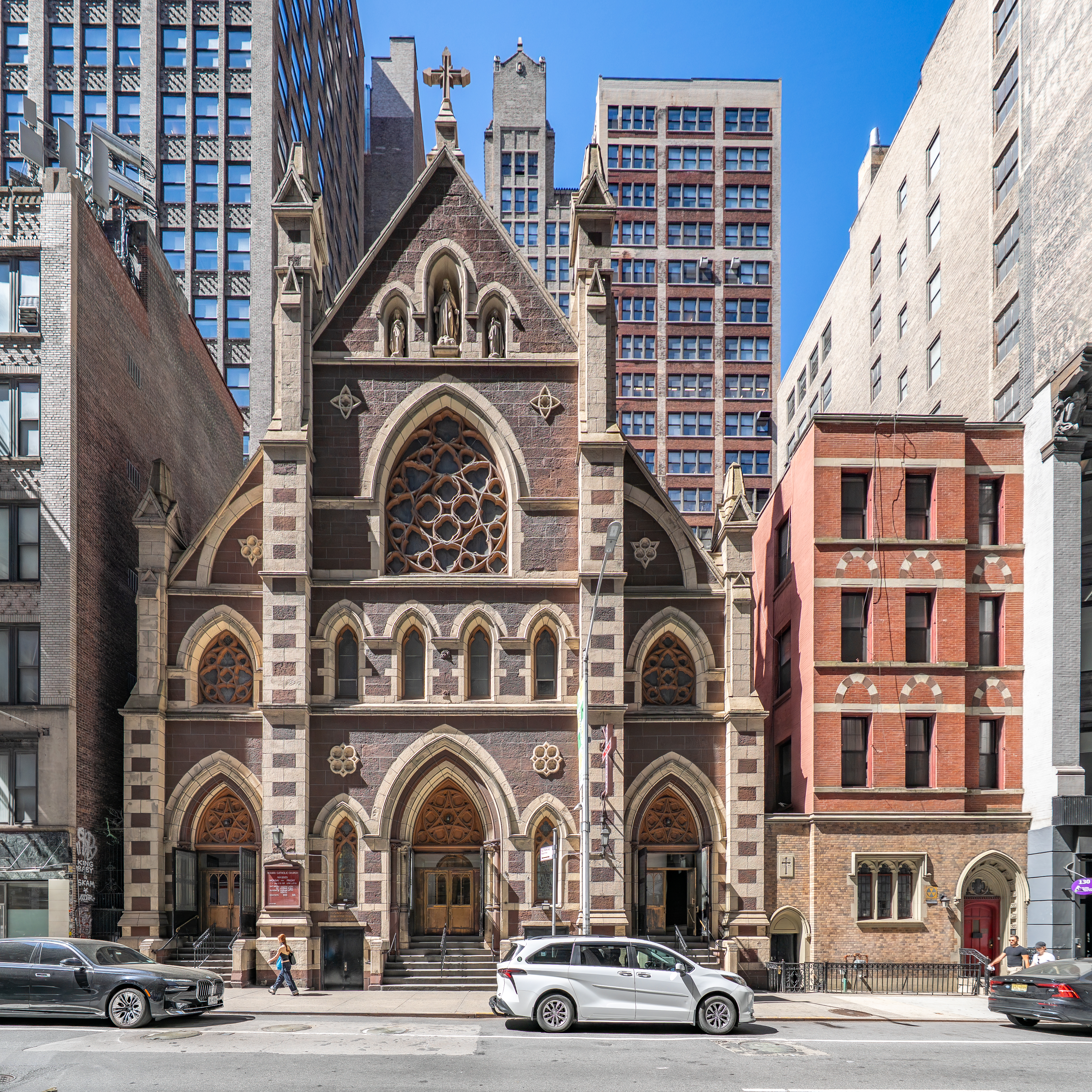
- (2026)
- Shrine and Parish Church of the Holy Innocents
- Location: 128 West 37th Street, Manhattan, New York
- Country: United States
- Denomination: Catholic Church
- Website: https://shrineofholyinnocents.org/

History
- Founded: 1866; 160 years ago

Architecture
- Functional status: Active
- Architect: Patrick Keely
- Style: Gothic Revival
- Years built: 1870; 156 years ago

Administration
- Diocese: Archdiocese of New York

Clergy
- Vicar(s): Rev. Fr. Louis Van Thanh, Parochial Vicar
- Pastor(s): Rev. Fr. James L. P. Miara, Pastor

The Church of the Holy Innocents is a Catholic parish church in the Archdiocese of New York, located at 128 West 37th Street at Broadway, Manhattan, New York City.

== History ==
The parish was established in 1866. It was formed from portions of St. Stephen the Martyr, St. Michael's, Holy Cross, Cathedral and St. Columba's parishes. The first pastor was Father John Larkin, formerly of County Galway, Ireland by way of St. Michael's. He purchased a small frame Episcopal church on the corner of Broadway and 37th St. The old name was retained and the chapel converted for use until a new church building could be constructed. The present edifice was dedicated on February 13, 1870.

As the city rapidly expanded northward the community, known as the "Tenderloin", teemed with immigrants from Europe. In 1872, A parochial school adjoining the church was built, staffed by the Sisters of Charity. Later, the Christian Brothers were enlisted to provide instruction. By the early 1900s the area was known for newspaper publishing (The New York Herald) and theaters (The Metropolitan Opera House (39th St)). Holy Innocents was called the "actor's church". Eugene O'Neill, the playwright, was baptized in the church in 1888.

Pastor Rev. Dr. Richard Brennan transferred here in 1890 from being pastor since 1875 of St. Rose of Lima's Old Church (New York City), after the death of the former pastor, Rev. Larkin. The parish debt being paid off, the church was consecrated by Archbishop Corrigan on February 12, 1901.

In the early 1900s, the parish owned three buildings behind the church, one serving as the rectory and the others bringing in some income from boarders. By 1910, the area went through a profound change as the tenements were rapidly replaced by imposing commercial buildings. With its congregation dispersed, Holy Innocents faced financial difficulties. On December 18, 1924 The New York Times reported that the Church had sold the three buildings "as a site for a twenty-story office building." The property was purchased by Morris Rosenstein, a dealer in cotton fabric, with a business on Bleecker Street. Rosenstein built a twenty-storey storage and loft building at 135-9 West 36th Street to designs by the eminent Emery Roth.

When Joyce Kilmer's daughter Rose (1912–1917) was stricken with infantile paralysis shortly after birth, Kilmer would stop by the church "every morning for months" on his way "to the office and prayed for faith".

== Present day ==
In addition to serving as a regional parish, the church has since 2009 been a location for daily Mass according to the 1962 Missale Romanum. While most churches have more Masses on Sundays than on weekdays, Holy Innocents offers four Masses per day from Monday to Friday, three Masses on Sundays and two on Saturdays. Of these, a Tridentine Low Mass is celebrated every day, followed by an additional Tridentine chant Mass each Sunday; other Masses at the church follow the Novus Ordo Missae. Holy Innocents is the oldest church in the Garment District, and the only parish church in the Archdiocese of New York to still offer a daily Mass according to the 1962 missal.

== Pastors ==
- Rev. John Larkin (d.1890)
- Rev. Dr. Richard Brennan (1890–1893) former pastor of St. Rose of Lima's Old Church (New York City) from 1875 to 1890
- Rev. Michael C. O'Farrell (January 1894–?)
- Rev. Msgr. Aloysius C. Dineen
- Rev. George Rutler (admin) (2013–2014)
- Rev. Leonard Villa (2014–2016)
- Rev. James L.P. Miara (2016–present)

== Architecture ==
Designed by Patrick C. Keely in the Gothic Revival style, the cornerstone was laid on June 20, 1869. The building was constructed of Ohio and Belleville mixed stone. The interior is noted for the high altar of white marble that is surmounted by a fresco of the Crucifixion by Constantino Brumidi. The church was dedicated on Sunday, February 13, 1870; music provided by the Seventh Regiment Band.

During Father O'Farrell's tenure two side altars of Carrara marble were installed. The Church has twenty stained glass windows from Munich; however subsequent building in the area has somewhat dimmed the interior.

=== "The Return Crucifix" ===
According to a popular account, one day, artist Charles Bosseron Chambers stopped by Holy Innocents for Mass. Afterwards he observed a young man praying before a life-size crucifix and immediately made a quick sketch. In later speaking to the man, Chambers learned that he was a Frenchman who had drifted away from religion since coming to New York but was now heading back to fight in World War I and had prayed for a return to the faith. Chambers produced an oil painting from the sketch, which was subsequently "...reproduced by one of the largest publishing companies in color and sepia, and [had] decided success." After the war, Chambers was later able to make contact with the soldier, who told him that having survived the war, he had entered a monastery. The refurbished crucifix, now termed "The Return Crucifix", is one of two shrines at the church, the other being of Our Mother of Perpetual Help, the Madonna of New York. There is also a stained glass rendition of Chambers' painting in the choir loft.
