= Holy Trinity Church (Upper West Side) =

Catholic church in Manhattan, New York

Coordinates: 40°47′08″N 73°58′39″W

The Church of the Holy Trinity
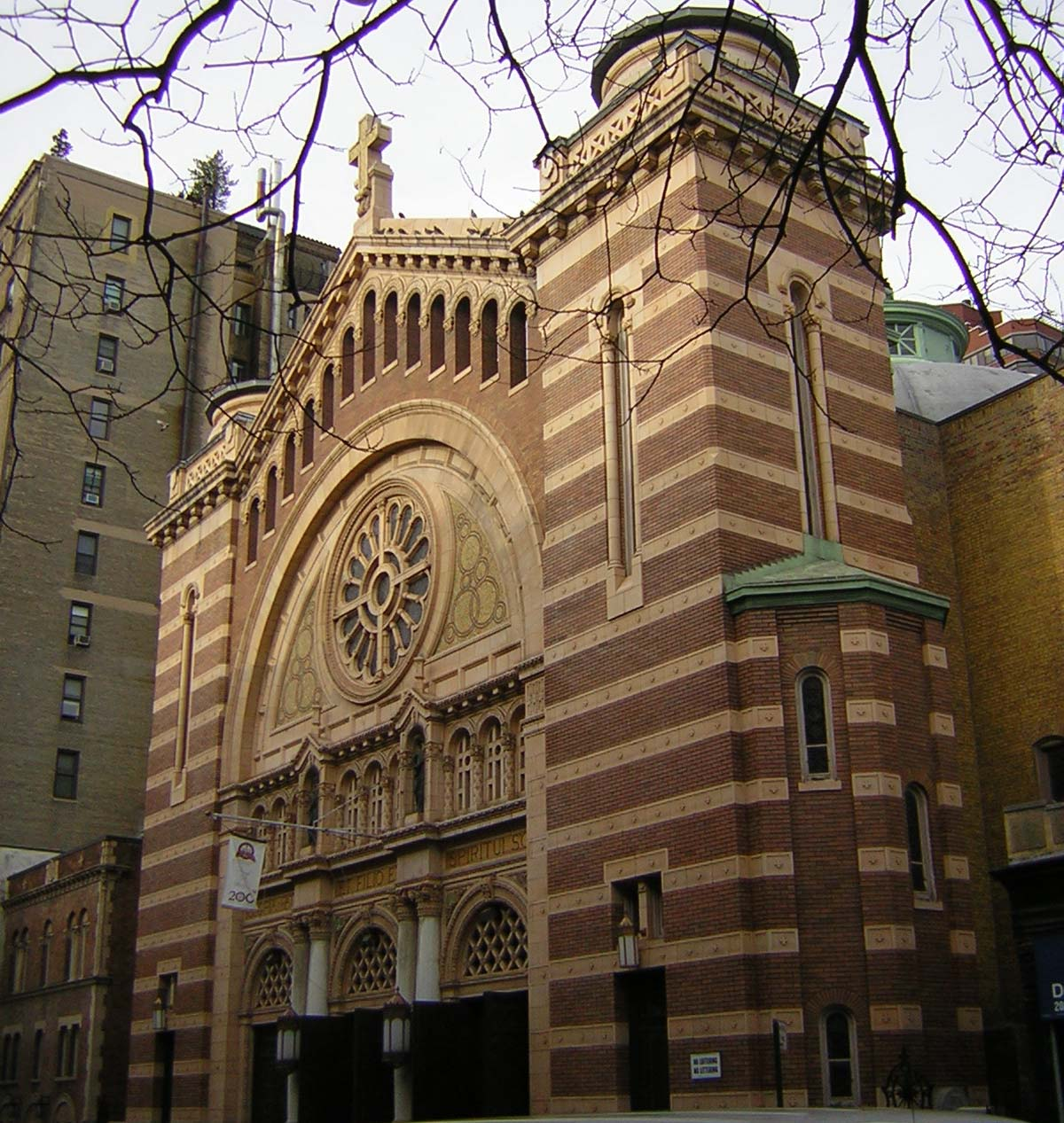

General information
- Architectural style: Romanesque Revival, Byzantine Revival
- Location: 213 West 82nd Street, New York, New York, United States of America
- Construction started: 1910 (for church); 1927 (for rectory)
- Completed: 1912 (for church)
- Cost: $50,000 (for 1927 rectory)
- Client: Roman Catholic Archdiocese of New York

Design and construction
- Architects: Joseph Hubert McGuire (for 1910-1912 church); Grosvenor Atterbury of 139 East 53rd Street (for 1927 rectory)

Website
- Holy Trinity Catholic Church, Manhattan

The Church of the Holy Trinity is a Roman Catholic parish church in the Roman Catholic Archdiocese of New York. It is located at 213 West 82nd Street near Amsterdam Avenue on the Upper West Side of Manhattan, New York City. The parish was established in 1898.

The church was built from 1910 to 1912 to the designs of Joseph Hubert McGuire. It has a dome of Guastavino tile. According to Frederick D. Taylor in his article "Medieval New York - Holy Trinity Church" the church was built deliberately in the Byzantine style, unusual for the time, and has been "considered to be one of the finest examples of Byzantine architecture in this country". Built of brick and terra cotta, the church was dedicated on May 11, 1912.
