= List of religious orders in the Roman Catholic Archdiocese of New York =

The Roman Catholic Archdiocese of New York covers New York, Bronx, and Richmond counties in New York City (coterminous with the boroughs of Manhattan, the Bronx, and Staten Island, respectively), as well as Dutchess, Orange, Putnam, Rockland, Sullivan, Ulster, and Westchester counties in New York state. The Archdiocese of New York is home to a large number of religious orders and congregations. Some of them arrived in the 19th century to serve various immigrant populations. As these groups became more assimilated, the congregations directed their efforts to various types of apostolates or other locations. While there are not as many religious communities present in 2007 as there were in 1957, they still make up a significant part of the archdiocese.

In 1959, there were 7,913 nuns and holy sisters ministering in the archdiocese, representing 103 different religious orders.

As of 2004, there were 913 priests of religious orders ministering in the archdiocese. As of 2008, 2,911 religious sisters and nuns and 368 religious brothers minister in the archdiocese. These religious come from over 120 different religious congregations and orders.

== Male religious orders in the archdiocese ==
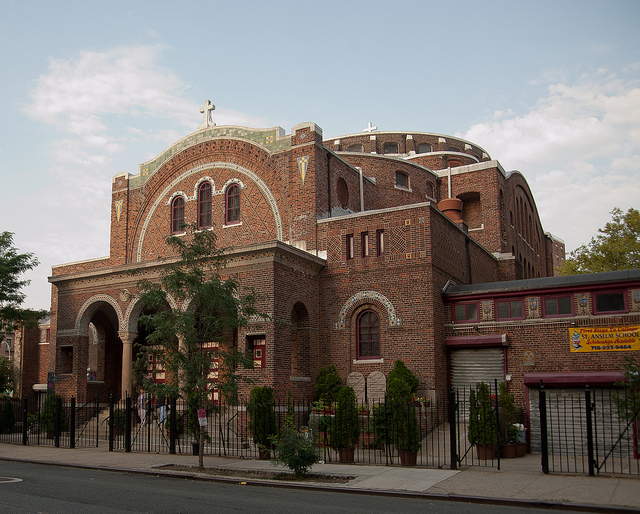
Saint Anselm's, (Agustinos Recoletos), Bronx, Nueva York.

- Augustinian Recollect Friars - The friars serve St. Anselm & St. Rocco Parishes in the Bronx, as well as St. John-Visitation. Tagaste Monastery, a House of Study, is located in Suffern, New York. Sacred Heart Church in Suffern, NY is served by three OAR priests.
- Brothers of the Christian Schools, (or De La Salle Brothers) - When the De La Salle Brothers' St. Joseph Normal Institute, a teacher training facility in Amawalk, was condemned to make way for the New Croton Reservoir in 1906, they relocated to Pocantico Hills. In 1930, the Rockefeller family purchased the property. The brothers then bought the Aspinwall estate, "Messina" in Barrytown. The Institute continued to operate until 1969; St. Joseph Juniorate and Novitiate until 1973. The property was later sold. The brothers conduct Manhattan University, St. Raymond High School for Boys, St. Peter's Boys High School, La Salle Academy, San Miguel School, De La Salle Academy, and Cristo Rey High School.
- Canons Regular of the Lateran - The Canons Regular of the Lateran of the Hispanoamerica Province staff three Parishes in the Archdiocese: St. Jude and Our Lady Queen of Martyrs in Manhattan, and St. Peter and St. Mary of the Assumption in Haverstraw, NY.
- Dominican Order - The Dominican friars of the province of St. Joseph staff four Parishes in the Archdiocese, three in New York City: St. Vincent Ferrer, St. Catherine of Siena, and St. Joseph in Greenwich Village, as well as Holy Innocents in Pleasentville, NY.
- Franciscan Friars of the Atonement - The Franciscan Friars of the Atonement are a Roman Catholic order of brothers and priests founded in 1898 by Fr. Paul Wattson, SA in the Hudson Valley. Headquartered at Graymoor in Garrison, New York, the Society of the Atonement has social, ecumenical, and pastoral ministries in the United States, Canada, Italy, and Japan.

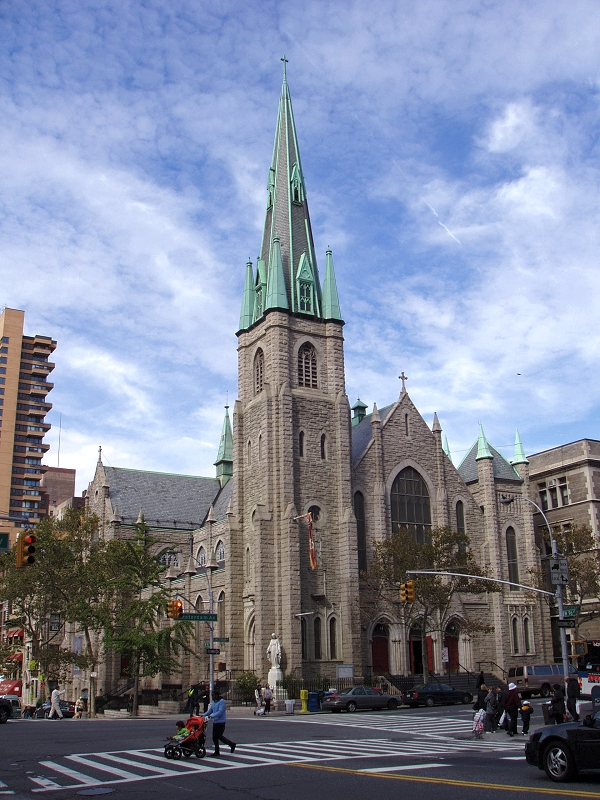
Holy Name of Jesus, Manhattan

- Franciscan Friars of Holy Name Province - One of seven U.S. units of the worldwide Order of Friars Minor founded by St. Francis of Assisi in 1209. The friars of Holy Name Province currently staff Holy Name of Jesus Roman Catholic Church and St. Francis of Assisi Church (Manhattan) in New York City, as well as Holy Cross Church in Callicoon, N.Y. Their ministries include St. Francis Breadline and St. Francis Friends of the Poor.
- Franciscan Friars Province of the Immaculate Conception serve at St. Anthony of Padua Parish and Friary, New York, NY; Mt. Alvernia Retreat House and Friary, Wappingers Falls, NY; Mount Saint Anthony on the Hudson is a residence for retired friars.
- Franciscan Friars of the Renewal- a mendicant order founded in New York by Fr. Benedict Groeschel and seven other former Capuchin friars. The community is composed of both Priests and Brothers who are dedicated to ministering to poorest of poor in New York and other parts of the nation and the world. The priests and brothers also assist at parishes and youth and young adult groups.
- Congregation of Christian Brothers (Irish Christian Brothers)- In 1923 the Santa Maria Novitiate in Mamaroneck moved to West Park where the brothers acquired the Durkee mansion. The Santa Maria Novitiate operated there until 1972. Their program now calls for an initial phase of formation to take place at a Community residence in Chicago. The West Park property was subsequently sold, and as of 2015 houses a craft distillery. The brothers today operate Iona University, Iona Preparatory School and Iona Grammar School, all three schools in New Rochelle, and All Hallows High School in Bronx.
- Marist Brothers - In 1906, the brothers established a house of studies, St. Ann Juniorate at (Poughkeepsie) which ran until 1942. St. Ann Novitiate opened in 1908 and moved to Tyngsboro in 1949. The Poughkeepsie property became the site of Marist University. The brothers conduct Mount Saint Michael Academy in the Bronx and Marist Brothers Center, a retreat center in Esopus, New York.
- Maryknoll Fathers & Brothers — Missioners serving throughout the world. Headquartered in Ossining, NY.
- Order of Friars Minor Capuchin The Capuchin Friars of the province of St. Mary separated from the province of St. Joseph in Detroit in 1952. The Provincialate is located at St. Conrad Friary in White Plains. Several notable parishes include Sacred Heart in Yonkers, Our Lady of Sorrows on the Lower East Side of Manhattan, and Capuchin Youth and Family Ministries (CYFM) based in Garrison.
- Order of Saint Augustine (OSA) - The Augustinians staff St. Nicholas of Tolentine Parish in the Bronx. Mother of Good Counsel Novitiate in New Hamburg, New York) ran from 1925 to about 1986 before it was closed.
- Paulist Fathers - The Paulist Fathers' "mother church" is St. Paul the Apostle Church at West 60th Street and Columbus Avenue in Manhattan. The Paulist founder, the Servant of God Isaac Thomas Hecker, C.S.P., is entombed inside St. Paul's Church. The Paulist Fathers have served the Archdiocese of New York since their founding in 1858.
- Redemptorist Fathers - The Fathers and lay Brothers of this congregation operate Immaculate Conception Parish in the South Bronx as well as the Basilica of Our Lady of Perpetual Help in Sunset Park, Brooklyn.
- Salesians of Don Bosco - The Salesian Priests and Brothers have their motherhouse for the province of St. Philip the Apostle in New Rochelle in Westchester County. The Salesians also have their formation house, several parishes and a high school in New Rochelle and Port Chester.
- Scalabrinian Missionaries - The main office of the St. Charles Borromeo Province is located in New York, NY. They serve at Our Lady of Pompeii Church (Manhattan) and run the Center for Migration Studies on 60th Street.
- Society of Jesus - Today, Jesuits number 20,170 (with 14,147 priests), and compose the largest male religious order in the Roman Catholic Church. They operate in six churches in the archdiocese, Fordham University and Fordham Preparatory School, Loyola High School, Regis High School, Xavier High School, Ignatius Loyola School and Nativity Mission School, all located in New York City. Jogues Retreat Center, located in Cornwall, New York, is operated by them, as well.

== Female religious orders in the archdiocese ==
- Apostles of the Sacred Heart of Jesus - Formerly known as the Missionary Zelatrices of the Sacred Heart of Jesus, the sisters serve at the following schools in the archdiocese: Our Lady of Pompeii (Greenwich Village), Santa Maria (Bronx), Sacred Heart Learning Center (Bronx) and St. Joseph (Manhattan). One sister also ministers at Immaculate Conception Church in Tuckahoe (2010).
- Carmelite Sisters for the Aged and Infirm - Operate three nursing homes in the archdiocese: Carmel Richmond on Staten Island, Mary Manning Walsh in Manhattan and St. Patrick in the Bronx.
- Congregation of Notre Dame - The Congregation of Notre Dame sisters sponsor the Notre Dame Academy in Staten Island. The sisters formerly ran Notre Dame College in Staten Island, before its merging with St. John University in 1975 (2009), they also fund and work at Villa Maria School, a K-8 school in the Bronx, NY.
- Daughters of Divine Charity - The sisters have a convent on Staten Island and minister at St. Joseph Hill Academy (2009).
- Daughters of Saint Paul - The sisters have a convent on Staten Island and work in the field of evangelization with the media of social communication. They run a bookcenter in Manhattan and visit parishes and schools with Catholic resources.
- Discalced Carmelite nuns - The New York Carmel was founded in Manhattan in the 1920s. It subsequently moved to the Bronx, and relocated again to Beacon in 1980.
- Dominican Sisters of Blauvelt - The sisters founded Dominican College in Blauvelt, and staffed and ministering in numerous shelters, schools and hospitals.

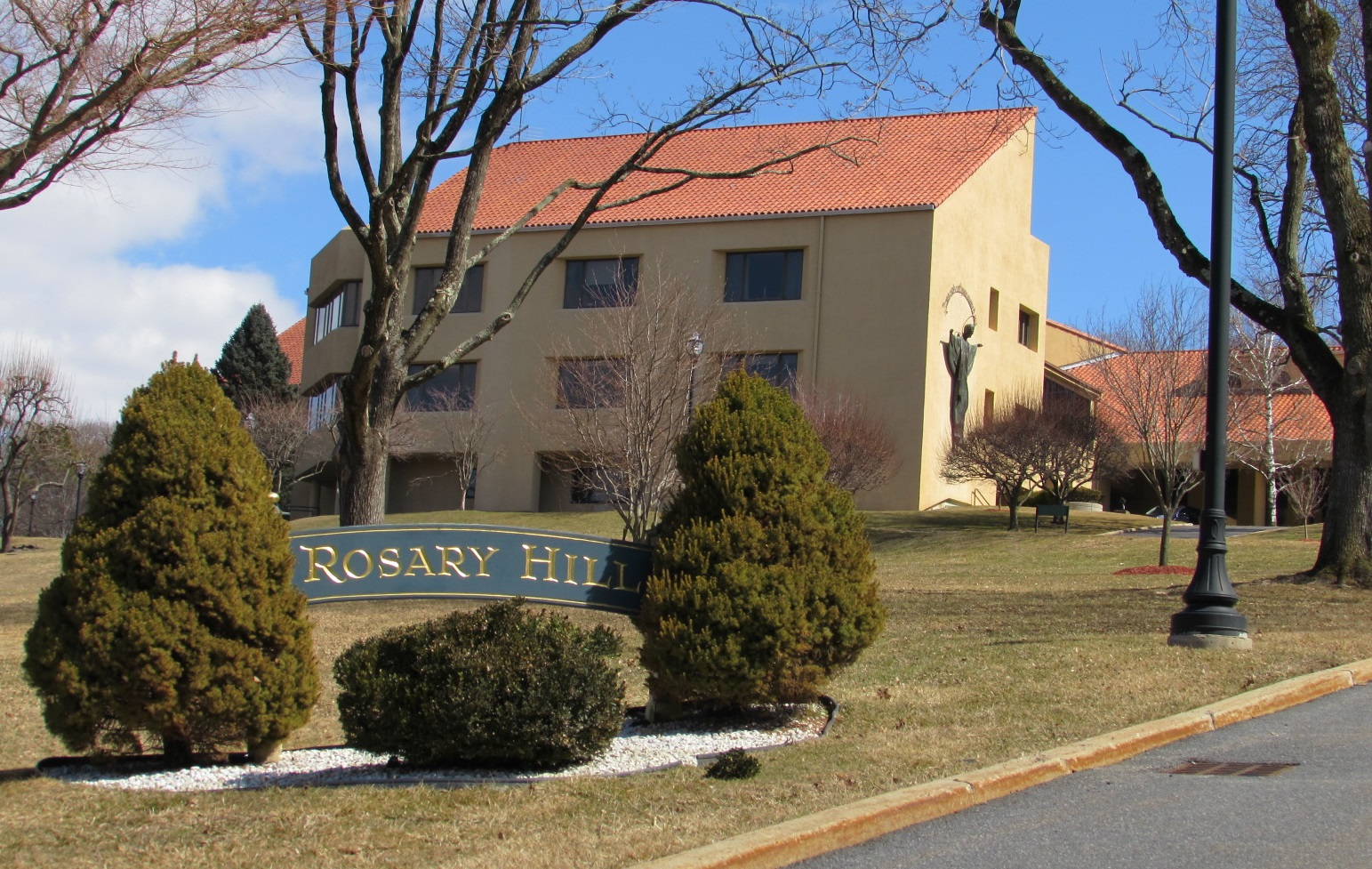
Rosary Hill Home

- Dominican Sisters of Hawthorne - The Sisters, whose primary apostolate is to nurse the indigent dying of cancer, run Rosary Hill Home in Hawthorne. They were founded by Mother Mary Alphonsus, O.S.D., born Rose Hawthorne Lathrop, the daughter of the noted author, Nathaniel Hawthorne.
- Dominican Sisters of Hope - The community formed in 1995 from the merger of three Dominican congregations: the Dominican Sisters of Newburgh, NY (1883), the Dominican Sisters of St. Catherine of Siena (1891) of Fall River, Massachusetts, and the Dominican Sisters of the Sick Poor (1910) of Ossining, NY. They sponsor Mount Saint Mary College in Newburgh and Mariandale Retreat Center in Ossining. The Sisters minister in healthcare in New York City, and in education, social service and pastoral ministries.

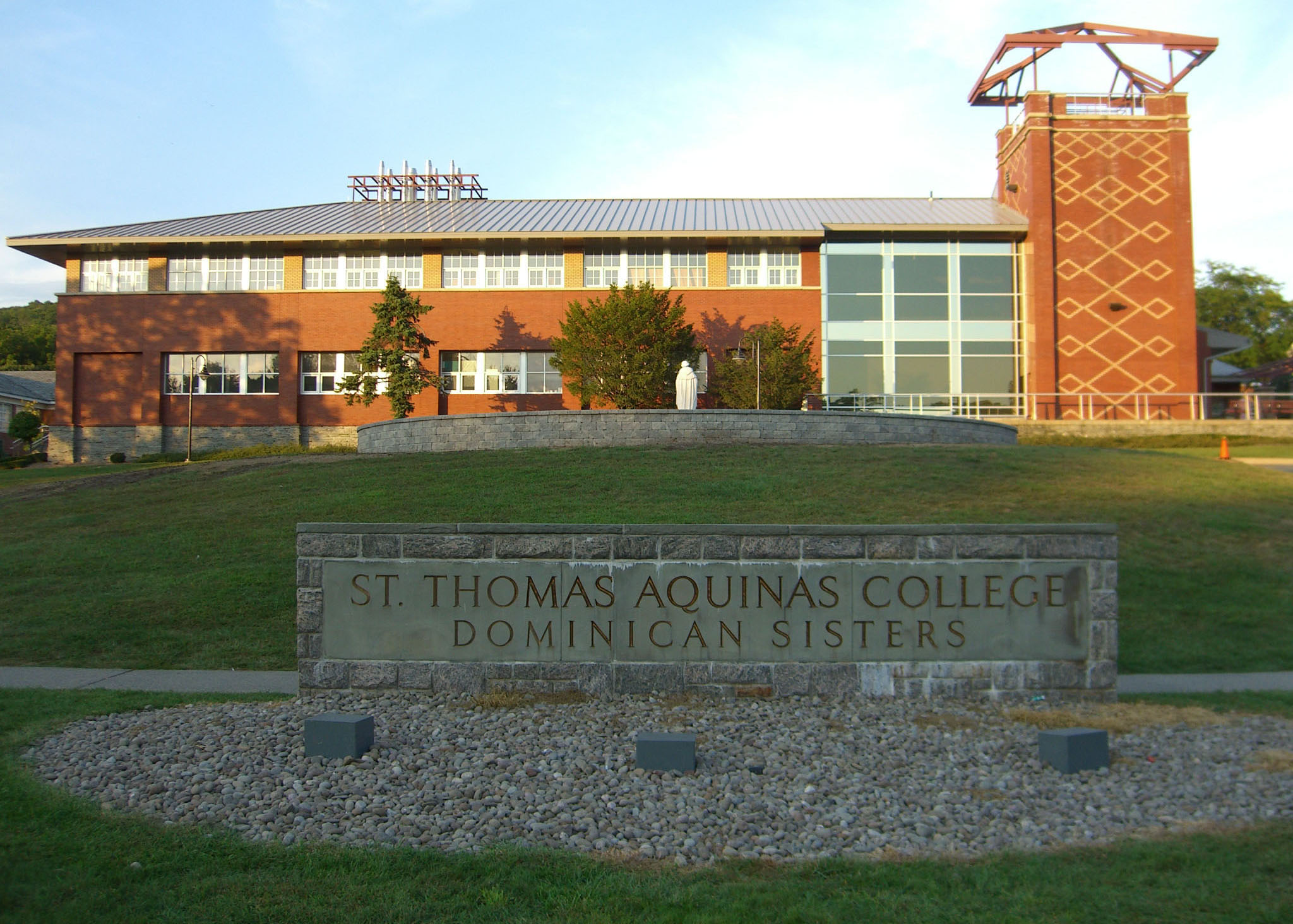
St. Thomas Aquinas College, Sparkill, NY

- Dominican Sisters of Sparkill - The Sisters, founded in 1876, established St. Thomas Aquinas College, and operate Aquinas High School in the Bronx and Albertus Magnus High School in Bardonia. The Sisters minister in over 35 parishes and schools. Today, the sisters number 337 and the motherhouse is located in Sparkill, New York.
- Dominican Sisters of Our Lady of the Springs - This is a new congregation founded in 2009 with members from the Dominican Sisters of Columbus. The Sisters staff St. Vincent Ferrer High School in Manhattan, and have a convent in Ossining.
- Dominican Sisters of Perpetual Adoration - The nuns, the cloistered "Second Order" in the Dominican Order, have a monastery which opened in 1889, located in the Hunts Point section of the Bronx (2009). It is the oldest active Dominican monastery in the United States.
- Franciscan Handmaids of Mary - St. Edward Novitiate on Staten Island closed in 2003. The sisters run St. Benedict Day Nursery in Harlem, and minister in parochial schools. Their motherhouse is located in Harlem. (2010).
- Franciscan Missionaries of Mary - have convents in the Bronx, Manhattan and Millbrook. The Sisters minister at Cardinal Hayes Home for Children.
- Franciscan Sisters of Allegheny - The Sisters, whose past ministries in the archdiocese included St. Clare and St. Elizabeth Hospitals in Manhattan, serve at St. Anthony of Padua Church (Manhattan) and a homeless shelter for women in the Hells Kitchen section of Manhattan.
- The Franciscan Sisters of the Atonement are a missionary order of sisters who have established catechetical and daycare centers all over North America, serving rural communities throughout the western United States, Canada, and inner city locales, such as Harlem in New York City. Several accompanied the Japanese-American communities they served into the forced resettlement conducted during World War II. Today, the Sisters serve in the archdiocese in Port Chester and Yonkers.
- Franciscan Sisters of the Poor - The Sisters, who came to the archdiocese in 1865, ministered for a century at St. Francis Hospital and St. Anthony Sanatarium in the Bronx, before their closing in 1966. They also operated the Frances Schervier Nursing Home in the Riverdale section of the Bronx, which they sold to a medical chain about A.D. 2000. They minister today at St. Anthony Community Hospital and the Schervier Pavilion, both in Warwick, New York (2009).
- Little Sisters of the Assumption - The Sisters, who used to administer homes for the sick poor, operate the Little Sisters of the Assumption Family Health Service, which they established in 1958, in Manhattan at 125th W. 130th St. The novitiate was at 241 East 15th Street in (Manhattan) from 1891 to 1954, and then at 1195 Lexington Avenue from 1954 to 1984.
- Little Sisters of the Poor - The Sisters operate the Jeanne Jugan Residence in The Bronx (2009).
- Maryknoll Sisters of St. Dominic—First US-based congregation of women religious dedicated to world mission. Located in Ossining, NY. Currently number 448 Sisters and serve in 24 nations of the world.
- Missionary Oblates of the Blessed Trinity - The Sisters have their novitiate located in Hopewell Junction, New York and teach at Immaculate Conception School (Gun Hill Road) in the Bronx (2009).
- Missionary Sisters of the Immaculate Heart of Mary - formerly known as the Missionary Canonesses of St. Augustine, these Belgian Sisters had convents at 437 West 47th Street and on Washington Square North in Manhattan (1927). In 1948, the sisters took over operation of the Queen's Daughters' Day Nursery in Yonkers, New York. In the 1960s, the semi-enclosed congregation changed its nature to a more active one and was renamed the Missionary Sisters of the Immaculate Heart of Mary. The eight sisters in New York continue their ministry at their residence at the Kittay Senior Apartments in the Bronx.
- Missionary Sisters of the Sacred Heart of Jesus - The Sisters have convents located in West Park, Manhattan and Dobbs Ferry. They administer at Cabrini Center for Nursing and Rehabilitation (Manhattan), Cabrini Nursing Home (Dobbs Ferry), Cabrini Immigrant Services (Manhattan & Dobbs Ferry), Mother Cabrini High School (Manhattan), St. Frances Cabrini Shrine (Manhattan) and St. Cabrini Home (West Park). The congregation previously ran Columbus Hospital in Manhattan, which became known as Cabrini Medical Center, from 1896 to 2008, when it closed (2009).
- Monastic Family of Bethlehem and the Assumption of the Virgin - This order of monastic Sisters was founded in Rome in 1950. The Order came to the United States, and the archdiocese, in 1987. They have a monastery located in Livingston Manor, New York (2009).
- Oblates of Jesus the Priest - Dedicated to assisting priests and promoting the priesthood. Daily Eucharistic adoration, rosary, and Liturgy of the Hours.
- Order of Discalced Carmelites - The cloistered nuns have one monastery located in the archdiocese, which is located in Beacon. The monastery was formerly located in The Bronx until 1982. In 2000, the nuns merged with two of their daughter foundations, the Carmelite monasteries from Barre, Vermont, and Saranac Lake, New York (2009), the new community took the name of Carmel of the Incarnation.
- Parish Visitors of Mary Immaculate - The Sisters' motherhouse, Marycrest, is located in Monroe, New York. Their apostolate is to visit homes for direct person-to-person evangelization, and to check on children in broken homes. Some Sisters also minister in parish Religious Education programs (2009).
- Redemptoristine Nuns - The cloistered Order of the Most Holy Redeemer was founded in Scala, Italy, in 1731. The nuns came to Esopus, New York, in 1957, and established the Mother of Perpetual Help Monastery on the grounds of Mount St. Alphonsus, the seminary of the Redemptorist Fathers. After the sale of the property in 2012, the nuns relocated with the Discalced Carmelites in Beacon, with whom they now share the monastery.
- Religious of the Sacred Heart of Jesus - The Sisters run the Convent of the Sacred Heart school, located in Manhattan (2009).

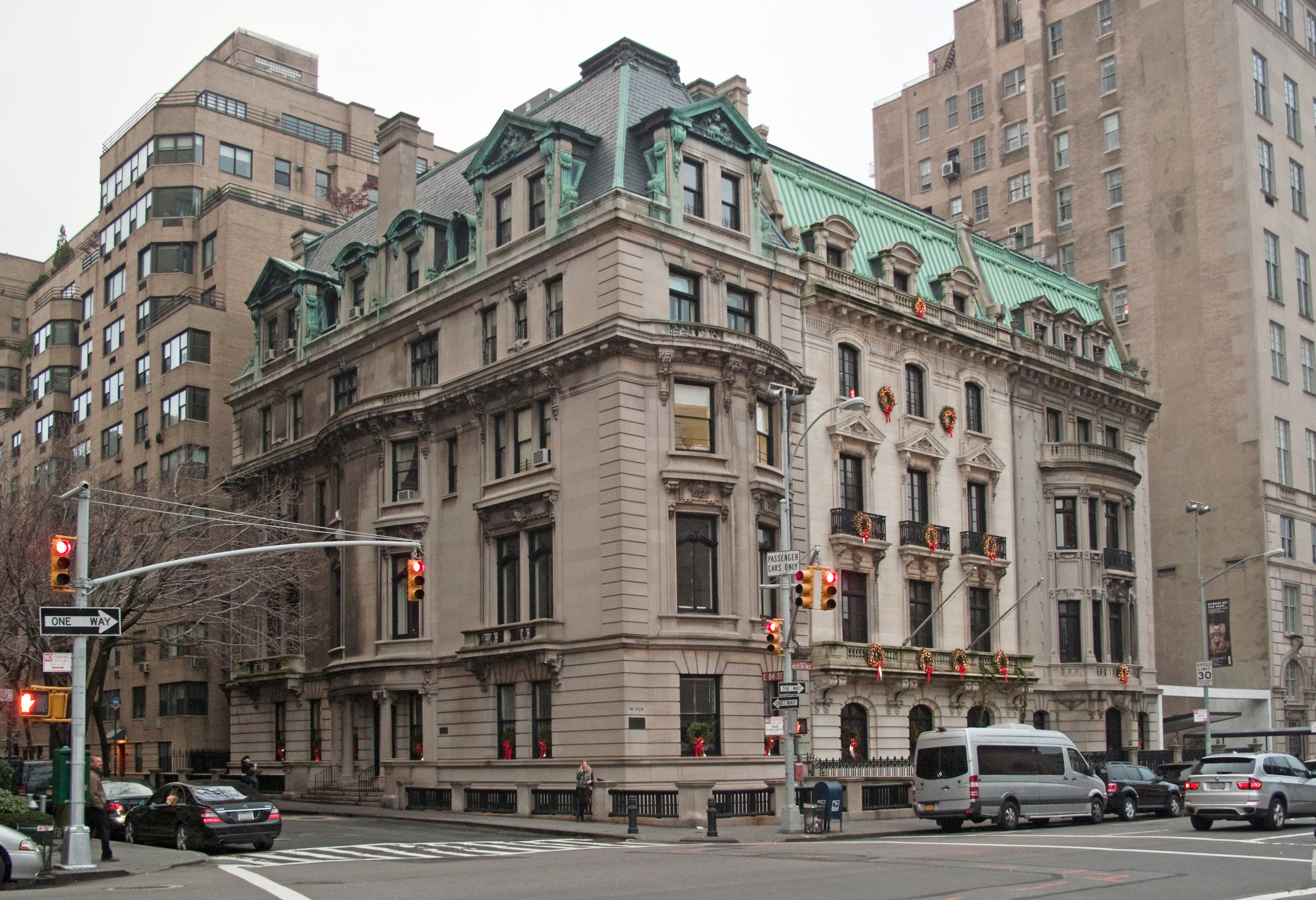
Marymount School, NYC

- Religious of the Sacred Heart of Mary - The Sisters' Provincial headquarters is located in Tarrytown, New York. The Sisters founded and ran Marymount College in Tarrytown, New York for almost 100 years, until its merger in 2002 with Fordham University. The Sisters also ran Marymount Manhattan College, which became non-sectarian in the 1980s. The Sisters run the Marymount School in Manhattan. From 1907 to 2007 the congregation ran St. Joseph Novitiate in Tarrytown; they subsequently consolidated an international novitiate in Brazil.
- Sacramentine Sisters - Monastery and school was established in Yonkers in 1915 in the historic Ethan Flagg House; sold in 1991 when the Sisters moved temporarily to Warwick, New York; in 1998, they established Blessed Sacrament Monastery in Scarsdale, New York.
- Sisters, Servants of Mary - These Sisters, founded in Spain and working internationally, minister to terminally-ill patients in their homes. Their convent is located at 3305 Country Club Road, Bronx, N.Y. (2009).
- Sisters of Charity of New York - The Sisters of Charity can be considered to be one of the most, if not the most, influential religious congregation in the archdiocese. After establishing the first community of religious Sisters in the diocese in 1817, the Sisters began to staff dozens of parochial schools, the College of Mount St. Vincent, the now-closed Elizabeth Seton College in Yonkers, the New York Foundling Hospital and former St. Vincent Catholic Medical Centers in Manhattan and Staten Island. As of 2021, There are 224 Sisters of Charity of New York and 130 Associates.
- Sisters of Divine Providence - Founded in France, these Sisters worked with the Fathers of Mercy to help newly arrived French immigrants. To this end, they established Leo House to provide secure housing for young working women.
- Sisters of the Divine Compassion - The Sisters ran Our Lady of Good Counsel Academy (closed 2015) and Elementary School (closed 2017) in White Plains. They previously operated Good Counsel College in White Plains, which merged with Pace College in the 1980s. They continue to operate Preston High School in the Bronx, a food pantry and thrift shop in Dover Plains, New York, and the Divine Compassion Spirituality Center in White Plains.
- Sisters of Life - Founded in 1991 by Cardinal John Joseph O'Connor, Archbishop of New York. They have four convents in the archdiocese: one in Manhattan, two in the Bronx and one in Yonkers. The Sisters staffed the Archdiocesan Family Life Office and run shelters for pregnant women (2009).
- Sisters of Mercy - They ran Our Lady of Victory Academy in Dobbs Ferry (closed 2011) and continue to operate St. Catharine Academy in The Bronx. They founded Mercy College, which became non-sectarian in the 1960s. The sisters also run Mercy Center in The Bronx, a counseling and spiritual center.
- Sisters of Our Lady of Christian Doctrine - Founded in New York City in 1910, the Sisters are a diocesan congregation. They run a retreat center in Nyack, where the motherhouse is located. The congregation has 16 members (2018), down from a high of 72. Due to their dwindling numbers, they sold 75% of their grounds to the Trust for Public Land, to preserve the grounds for future generations.
- Sisters of the Presentation of the Blessed Virgin Mary have two congregations in the Archdiocese. The sisters arrived in New York from Ireland in 1874 and established St. Michael's Orphanage on Staten Island. This became the Sisters of the Presentation of Staten Island. They established a new foundation in Massachusetts, the Sisters of the Presentation of Fitchburg and purchased property near Newburgh, New York that became Mount St. Joseph, the motherhouse of the Presentation Sisters of Newburgh. In 1997, the Newburgh and Fitchburg communities merged to form the Presentation Sisters of New Windsor. They continue to work in education, healthcare, and parish ministry.
- Sisters of the Resurrection - The Sisters originally staffed the parish school of the Church of St. Clement Mary Hofbauer in Manhattan. The novitiate, the Mother Celine House of Studies, operated in Rye, New York from 1947 to 1973. Today they staff Maria Regina High School in Hartsdale, and teach at St. Casimir School in Yonkers and St. Margaret of Cortona School in the Bronx. In 2010, the Sisters took a new mission at St. Columba Church in Hopewell Junction, running the school and religious education office.
- Sisters of St. Agnes - The sisters, whose motherhouse is located in Fond du Lac, Wisconsin, previously staffed a number of parochial schools, including Sacred Heart in Yonkers, Our Lady Queen of Angels in Harlem and Holy Family in the Bronx. The sisters work in the Leo House for German Catholics (2009).
- Sisters of St. Dorothy - They run St. Dorothy Academy and staff St. Patrick School, both on Staten Island (2009).
- Sisters of St. John the Baptist - The Sisters' retirement convent is located in Purchase, in which the sisters run a daycare. They also run and staff St. John Villa Academy and Elementary School and St. Roch School in Staten Island. The provincial house is located in The Bronx, where the sisters run the Providence Rest Nursing Home and St. Dominic School. The sisters formerly ministered at Our Lady of Loretto (1921–1978) and St. James (1942–2002), both located in Manhattan (2009).
- Sisters of St. Ursula - The Sisters established the now-closed Academy of St. Ursula in Kingston, and Notre Dame School in Manhattan. Three sisters minister at Notre Dame (2007).
- Missionary Sisters of the Catholic Apostolate - Also known as the Pallotine Sisters, their motherhouse is located in Harriman and they run St. Patrick Villa, also in Harriman (2009) They formerly served at Immaculate Conception School (Gun Hill Road) in the Bronx until the 1970s.
- Society of Helpers - Formerly known as the Society of Helpers of the Holy Souls, they minister in Manhattan (2009).
- Society of the Holy Child Jesus - They run the School of the Holy Child in Rye, and the Cornelia Connelly Education Center in Manhattan (2009).
- Ursulines - Founded and operate The Academy of Mount St. Ursula, in the Bronx which is the oldest, continually operating, all girls school in New York State. They also run The Ursuline School in New Rochelle.

== Religious orders no longer operating in the archdiocese ==
- Assumptionist Fathers - The Fathers were entrusted with the care of the Church of Our Lady of Esperanza, on the Upper West Side, and the Church of Our Lady of Guadelupe, on 14th Street, which was the first church established (1914) in the Archdiocese to serve the Spanish-speaking. The provincial house was also located in New York City. However, by 1998, the fathers had handed the churches back over to the archdiocese and the provincial house had moved to Massachusetts.
- Benedictine Monks - Monks from Saint John's Abbey in Collegeville, Minnesota came in 1891 to serve the German community of the Bronx. For this, they established and administered two parishes. One, St. Anselm Parish, was located in the South Bronx. The other, St. Benedict Parish, was located in the Throgs Neck section of the Bronx.
- Daughters of Mary, Health of the Sick - The sisters had their motherhouse, Vista Maria, located in Cragsmoor, New York. The order was founded in the 1930s and disbanded in 1976. Some members joined other religious orders, including the Sisters of Charity of New York.
- Society of St. Joseph of the Sacred Heart (Josephites) - Cofounded by New York native John R. Slattery as an offshoot of the Mill Hill Missionaries, the Josephites operated the minor seminary Epiphany Apostolic College and its successor institutions in the Newburgh area from 1925 to 1975.
- Sisters of St. Dominic of Amityville - The Sisters, whose motherhouse is located in Amityville, New York, ran the St. Joseph Sanitarium in Forestburgh in Sullivan County, which was the summer retreat of Cardinal Patrick Hayes. The facility closed in 1970. They also staffed parochial schools in Manhattan.
- Dominican Sisters of the Most Holy Rosary - The sisters, whose motherhouse is located in Sinsinawa, Wisconsin, came to the archdiocese to staff parochial schools. Among the schools they formerly staffed are Corpus Christi in Manhattan.
- Fathers of Mercy founded the parish of St. Vincent de Paul Church (Manhattan) in 1841 for French-speaking Catholics. Around 1931, they purchased the Butterfield mansion, "Craigside", in Cold Spring, New York and established St. Joseph Novitiate. Both the parish and novitiate were later closed.
- Marianites of Holy Cross - The Sisters ministered in healthcare and education, sponsoring St. Vincent de Paul Academy in Tarrytown, St. Louis Academy in Staten Island and the French Hospital in Manhattan.
- Mission Helpers of the Sacred Heart - The Sisters ran St. Pascal Day Nursery in Manhattan, and the Mount Mongola summer camp in Ellenville. The novitiate in Manhattan, New York closed in 1964. They also had convents located on Staten Island.
- Religious of Jesus and Mary - In 1911, the novitiate was in (Highland Mills) before being transferred to Kingsbridge. The Sisters have served at St. John's Parish and School in the Kingsbridge section of the Bronx for 100 years. They had a convent on Godwin Terrace opposite the original school building. They also conducted the Bethany Retreat and Spiritual Center in Highland Mills. As of 2021, the congregation is active in Massachusetts and Rhode Island.
- Sisters of Bon Secours - A group of nursing Sisters, their convent was located at 1195 Lexington Avenue from 1885 until 1947, when they returned to their motherhouse in France. Today, however, a major medical chain established by the Sisters of this same congregation out of the Boston area run several previously-Catholic hospitals.
- Sisters of Our Lady of Charity - Their primary apostolate was to work with women in need. They ran St. Andrew's Retreat House in Walden until 2006.
- Sisters of the Cenacle - The sisters, whose main focus was to run retreats for women to recollection and prayer, established a convent on Riverside Drive in 1893 and moved to Mount Kisco in 1956. The order later sold their land and left the archdiocese.
- Sisters of the Visitation - The Visitation Sisters had a monastery in the Riverdale section of the Bronx. Due to declining vocations, the monastery closed and most sisters moved to the Visitation Monastery in Brooklyn.
- Sulpician Fathers - The Fathers staffed St. Joseph Seminary in Yonkers from 1896 to 1906.
- Xaverian Brothers - The Brothers came to the archdiocese in 1940 and helped staffed Cardinal Hayes High School, Our Lady of Good Counsel School in Manhattan, Archbishop Stepinac High School in White Plains and Mount Loretto on Staten Island.
- Sisters of St. Francis of the Mission of the Immaculate Virgin: Their headquarters, Immaculate Conception Motherhouse, was located in Hastings-on-Hudson, New York. The community developed from the Sisters of St. Francis of Philadelphia when Father John C. Drumgoole requested some sisters to help him run the Mission of the Immaculate Virgin at Mount Loretto in Staten Island, one of the largest child care facilities in the city. The New York branch became an independent congregation in 1893. Mount St. Clare Novitiate was located in (New Hamburg, New York). They used to run St. Clare Academy in Hastings-on-Hudson, and St. Francis Hospital in Poughkeepsie, New York. They merged in 2004 with the Sisters of St. Francis of Syracuse and others to form the Sisters of St. Francis of the Neumann Communities.
- Sisters of Reparation of the Congregation of Mary also known as the "Sisters of St. Zita" - Founded on West 14th Street in Manhattan, the Sisters were founded to work with young women in domestic service. They later established St. Zita's Villa, a nursing home, in Monsey in 1938. The last member of the congregation died in 2020.

== Seminaries and novitiates run by religious orders ==
=== Novitiates ===
- Mount St. Florence Novitiate (Peekskill) - Run by the Sisters of the Good Shepherd; operated from 1874 to 1986.
- Mount St. Joseph Novitiate (Peekskill) - Run by the Missionary Sisters of the Third Order of St. Francis; operated from 1870 to 1975.
- Our Lady of Providence Novitiate (Chappaqua) - Run by the Helpers of the Holy Souls; operated from 1930 to 1973.
- St. Stanislaus Novitiate (Yonkers) - Run by the Society of Jesus; operated from 1917 to 1923.
- Ursuline Novitiate (Beacon) - Run by the Ursuline Sisters; closed ca. 1980.
- Ursuline Novitiate (Middletown) - Run by the Ursuline Sisters.

=== Seminaries ===
- Capuchin Theological Seminary (Garrison) - Run by the Capuchin Friars; closed in 1972.
- Eymard Seminary (Hyde Park) - Run by the Fathers of the Blessed Sacrament; closed in 1978. * Eymard Seminary (Suffern) - Run by the Fathers of the Blessed Sacrament; opened in 1909 and moved to Hyde Park.
- Loyola Jesuit Seminary (Shrub Oak) - Run by the Society of Jesus; operated from 1955 to 1973.
- Marianist Preparatory Seminary (Beacon) - Run by the Society of Mary; opened in 1922.
- Mount Alvernia Seminary (Wappingers Falls) - Run by the Order of Friars Minor; operated from 1950 to 1967.
- Our Lady of Hope Mission Seminary (Newburgh) - Run by the Oblates of Mary Immaculate; operated from 1946 to 1971.
- Sacred Heart Seraphicate (Yonkers) - Run by the Capuchin Friars.
- Salesian Seminary (Goshen) - Run by the Salesians of Don Bosco; operated from 1925 to 1985.
- St. Albert Junior Seminary (Middletown) - Run by the Carmelites.
- Mount St. Alphonsus Seminary (Esopus) - Run by the Redemptionist Fathers; operated from 1907 to 1985.
- St. Andrew-on-Hudson Seminary & Novitiate (Hyde Park) - Run by the Society of Jesus; closed in 1969.
- St. Bonaventure Seminary (The Bronx) - Run by the Capuchin Friars; operated ca. 1940.
- St. Charles Seminary (Staten Island) - Run by the Missionaries of St. Charles Borromeo; operated from 1948 to 1966.
- St. Francis Seminary (Staten Island) - Run by the Order of Friars Minor Conventual; closed by 1997.
- St. Joseph Seraphic Seminary (Callicoon) - Run by the Order of Friar Minors; operated from 1901 to 1968.
- St. Pius X Seminary (Garrison) - Run by the Franciscan Friars of the Atonement; closed in 1969.
- Woodstock College Jesuit Seminary (Manhattan) - Run by the Society of Jesus; founded in 1869 in Maryland and moved in 1969. Closed in 1974.

== Locations of former convents/brothers' residences ==
Years in parentheses are the last known date active for the organization:

- Daughters of St. Paul - Convent located at 78 Fort Place, Staten Island (?-2008).
- Franciscan Missionaries of Mary - Convent located at 223 E. 45th St., Manhattan (1919).
- Little Sisters of the Assumption - Convent located at 312 E. 15th St., Manhattan (1915).
- Missionary Canonesses of St. Augustine - Convent located at 437 W. 47th St., Manhattan (1927) and 236 E. 15th St., Manhattan (1956).
- Parish Visitors of Mary Immaculate - Blessed Sacrament Convent located at 328 W. 71st St., Manhattan (1921).
- Religious of Jesus and Mary - Our Lady of Peace Convent located at 225. W. 14th St., Manhattan (1960).
- Sisters of Bon Secours - Convent located at 1195 Lexington Ave., Manhattan (1885–1947).
- Sisters of Charity of New York - Holy Trinity Convent located at 108 W. 85th St., Manhattan (1928); St. Monica Convent located at 404 E. 80th St., Manhattan (1944); Ascension Convent located at 220 W. 108th St., Manhattan (1960).
- Sisters of Mary Reparatrix - Convent located at 14 E. 29th St., Manhattan (1984).
- Sisters of Mercy - St. Catherine Convent located at 33-35 E. Houston St. (1848–1885) and St. Margaret Mary Convent located at 119 E. 177th St., Bronx (1939).
- Sisters of the Cenacle - St. Regis Convent located at 140th St. at Riverside Drive, Manhattan (1893–1956).
- Sisters of St. Francis - Mount St. Clare motherhouse located in New Hamburg (1928).
- Sisters of St. Ursula - Our Lady of Lourdes Convent located on 144th St. (1912–1943); Notre Dame Convent located on West 79th St. (1943–1989); Notre Dame Convent located on St. Mark's Place (1989–2002).
- Society of Helpers of the Holy Souls - Convent located at 114 E. 86th St. (1896–1967), 112 E. 36th St. (1915) and 11 E. 89th St. (1967)
- Society of the Holy Child of Jesus - St. Walburga Convent located at 630 Riverside Drive, Manhattan
