= Mary Eileen O'Brien =

American academic administrator

President of Dominican University New York
- In office 1997 – January 1, 2024
- Succeeded by: Mary Hughes (interim)
- In office 1979–1987
- Preceded by: Natalie Casey

Personal details
- Education: Dominican College; Columbia University; Manhattan College; Fordham University

Mary Eileen O'Brien is an American academic administrator and member of the Dominican Sisters of Blauvelt. She worked as the president of the Dominican University New York from 1979 to 1987 and again from 1997 to 2024.

== Life ==
O'Brien was raised in The Bronx. She earned a B.A. in English from Dominican College in 1965. In 1971, she completed a M.A. in mathematics from Manhattan College. She was a mathematics teacher at St. Benedict's School and St. Pius V High School. She worked as the principal of Saint Luke's School in South Bronx.

O'Brien joined the faculty at Dominican College in 1977. She served as the acting president for a year before being named president in 1979, succeeding Natalie Casey. She completed a master's degree in adult and higher education from the Teachers College, Columbia University in 1983. O'Brien worked as president until 1987 when she served as the leader of the congregation of sisters at the Dominican Sisters of Blauvelt for six years. She returned to her role as president of Dominican College in 1997. She earned a Ph.D. in educational administration and supervision from Fordham University. Her 2004 dissertation was titled, Presidents' Perception on Implementation of the Dominican Charism in the American Dominican College. Gerald M. Cattaro was her doctoral advisor. O'Brien retired on January 1, 2024, and was succeeded by interim president Mary Hughes.
