= Queen of All Saints Church (Brooklyn) =

Catholic parish church in Brooklyn, New York City, USA

Coordinates: 40°41′17.32″N 73°58′8.36″W

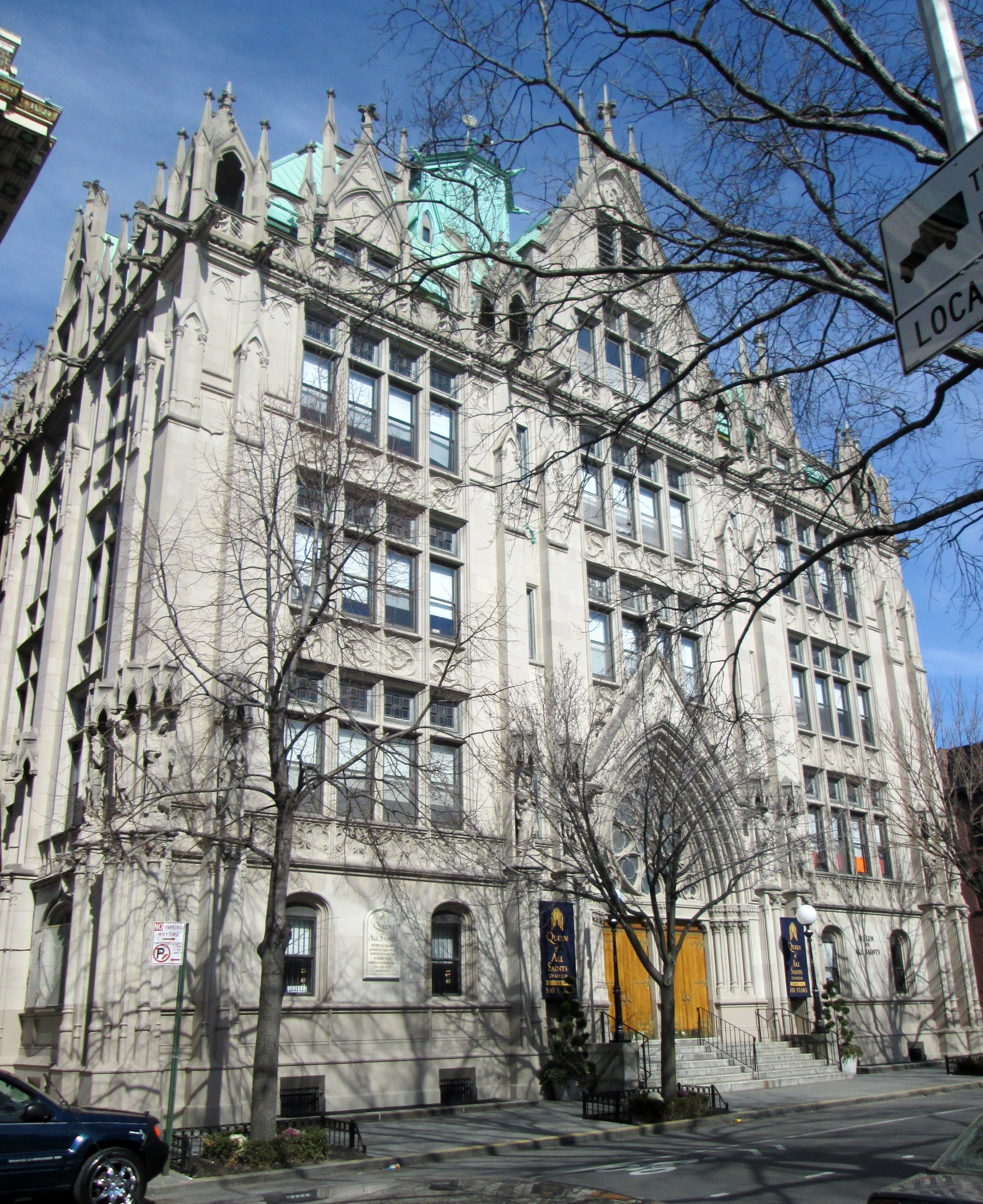
- (2013)

General information
- Architectural style: Gothic Revival
- Location: Fort Greene, Brooklyn, New York City, United States
- Construction started: 1906
- Completed: 1913
- Cost: $475,000 (for 1913 church)
- Client: Roman Catholic Diocese of Brooklyn

Technical details
- Structural system: Masonry stone

Design and construction
- Architects: Reiley & Steinback

The Queen of All Saints Church is located at 300 Vanderbilt Avenue on the corner of Lafayette Avenue in the Fort Greene neighborhood of Brooklyn, New York City. It is a Catholic parish church in the Roman Catholic Diocese of Brooklyn. The church is located within the Fort Greene Historic District.

== History ==
Queen of All Saints Church was built in 1910-13 and was solemnly dedicated on Thanksgiving Day, November 27, 1913. It is designed in the Gothic Revival style by the firm of Reiley & Steinback. The church's school was built at the same time, but the apse of the church and the rectory were not completed until 1915. The parish dates from 1879 and was originally called St. John's Parish. The school closed in August 2019 because of a 30% decline in the number of students enrolling in the school. It is currently unknown what the school will be used for in the future.

Up until the 1940s, the wing fronting Vanderbilt Avenue was graced with a spire above the roof.

== Organ ==
The organ was built in 1913 by Philipp Wirsching of Salem, Ohio and electrified in 1925. Considered an outstanding example of the Wirsching's artistry, the Organ Historical Society has recognized the instrument with an Historical Citation, giving it the number 66.

== Parish Life ==
Queen of All Saints offers daily Holy Mass and a rich devotional program, with First Friday and First Saturday Holy Hours, dedication to the Rosary, participation in the Miraculous Medal Novena, the Novena to St. Thérèse and the Chaplet of Divine Mercy. Faith Formation is no longer offered at the church because the school closed in August 2019.
