= Church of the Blessed Sacrament (Manhattan) =

Roman Catholic church in New York City

Coordinates: 40°46′38″N 73°58′52.2″W

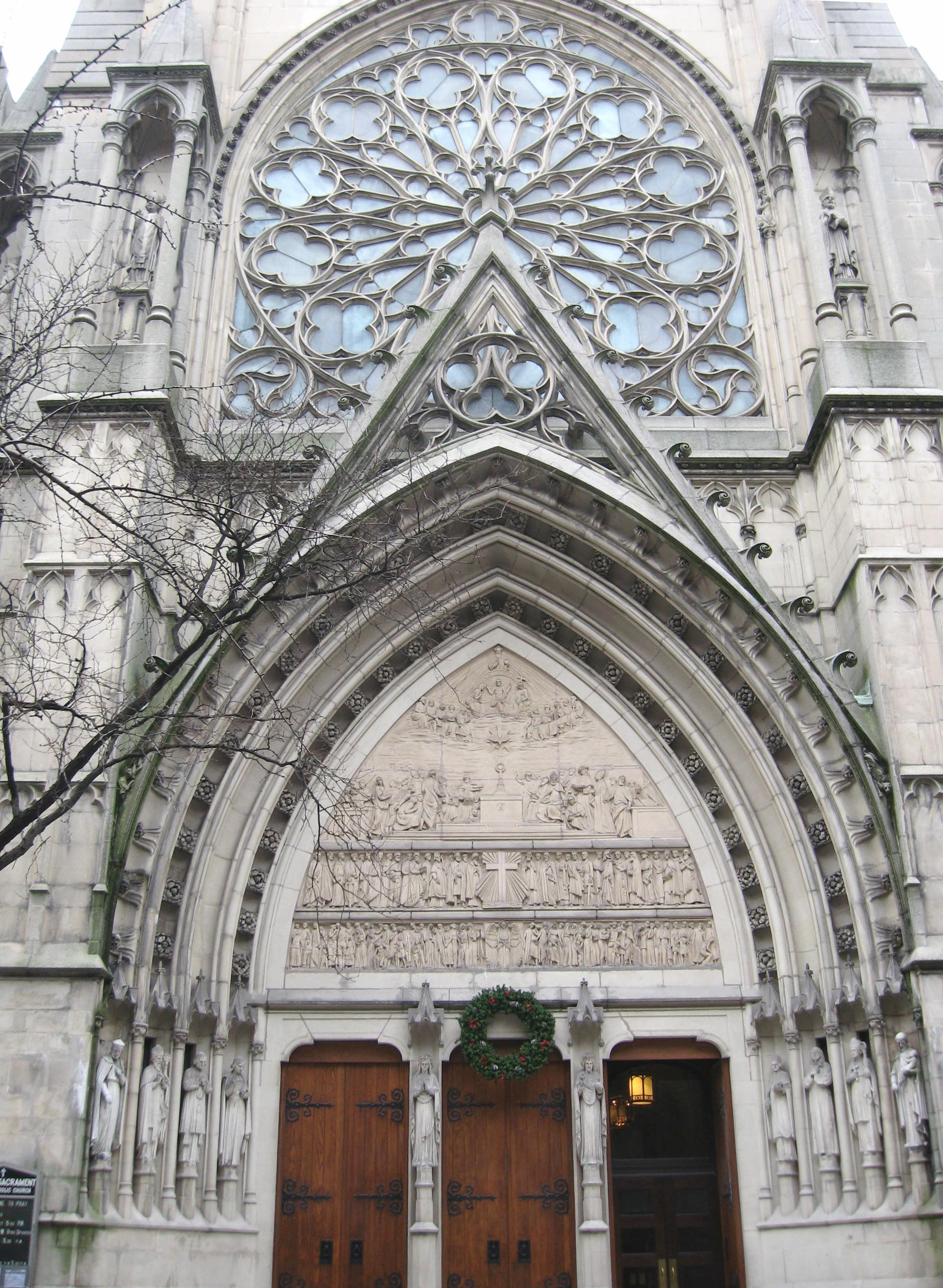
- Front portal, 2008
- Interactive map of the Church of the Blessed Sacrament area

General information
- Location: 152 West 71st Street, Manhattan, New York, United States
- Construction started: 1917
- Completed: 1920
- Client: Roman Catholic Archdiocese of New York

Design and construction
- Architect: Gustave E. Steinback

Website
- Church of the Blessed Sacrament, Manhattan

The Church of the Blessed Sacrament is a Roman Catholic parish church in the Roman Catholic Archdiocese of New York, located on the Upper West Side of Manhattan at 152 West 71st Street, just east of Broadway. The parish was established in 1887.

The present church was started in 1914 to designs by Gustave E. Steinback and the first mass was held on Christmas 1920.

A performing arts venue, The ArcLight Theatre, was located on the lower level.

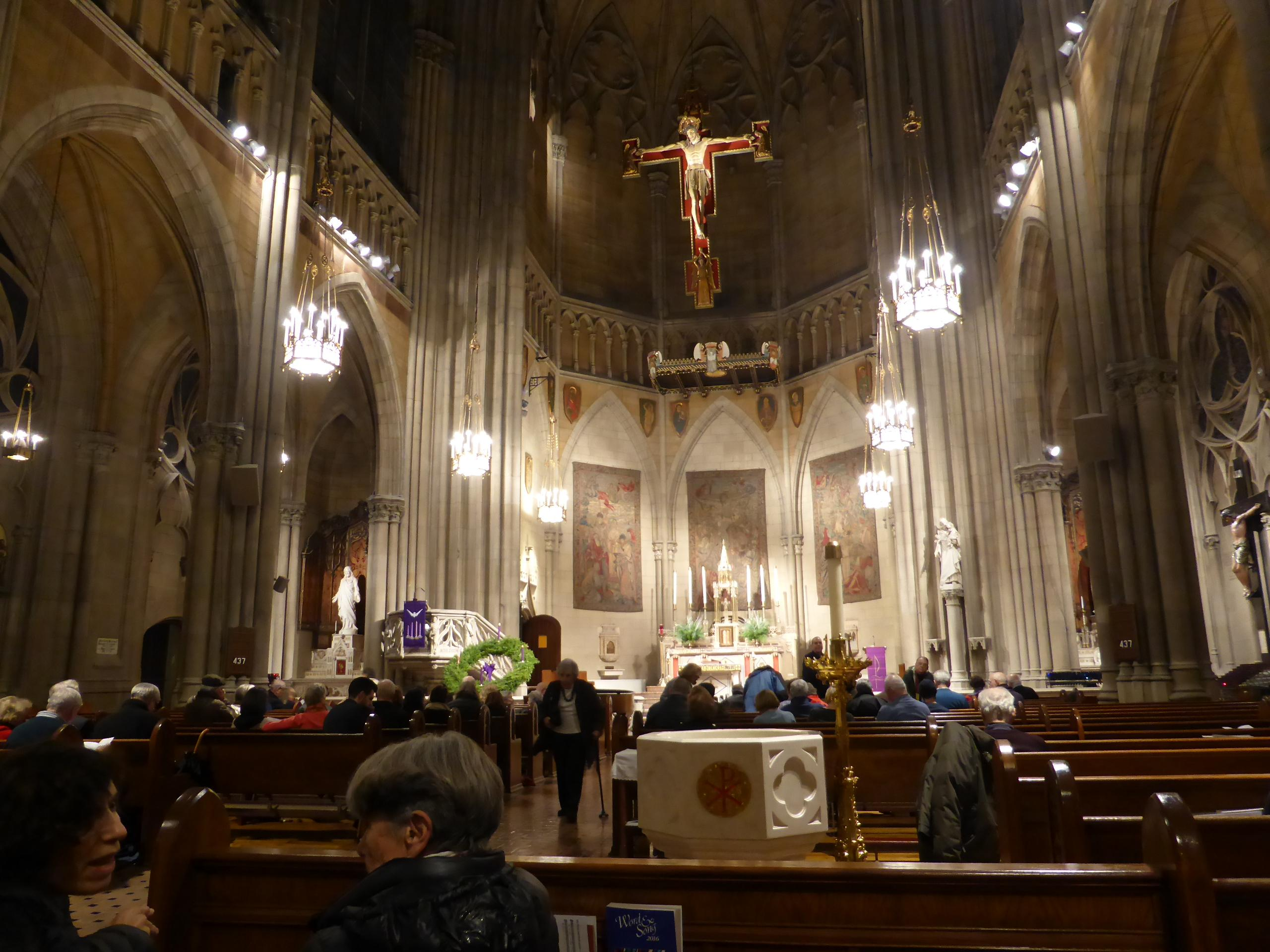
Interior
