= Gustave E. Steinback =

American architect

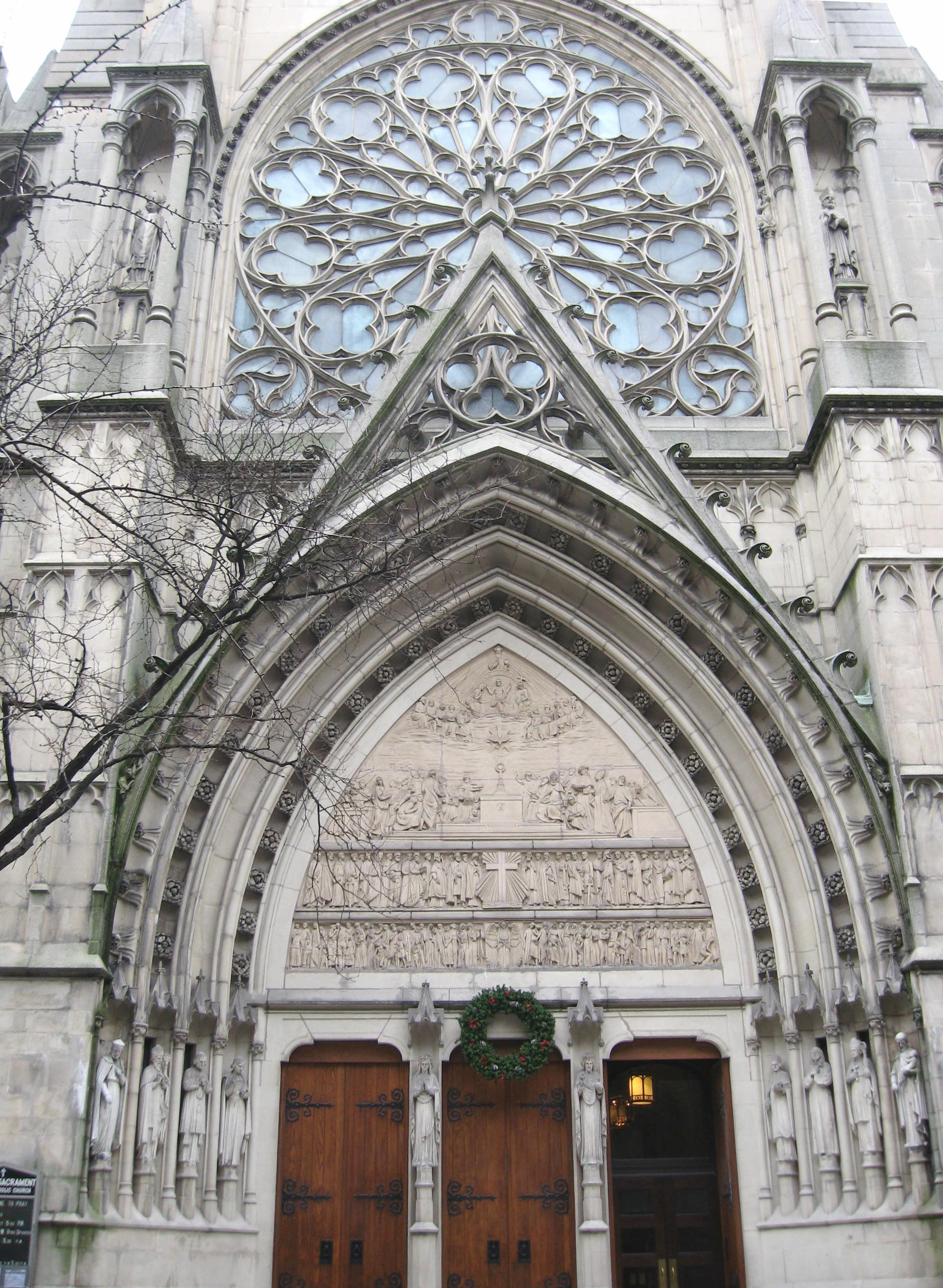
- Church of the Blessed Sacrament, Front portal (December 2008)
- Born: September 29, 1878; New York City
- Died: September 21, 1959; Stamford, Connecticut
- Known for: Architect

Gustave E. Steinback (1878–1959) was an American architect practicing in New York City in the early and mid twentieth century. He was particularly known as a designer of Roman Catholic schools and churches. His offices were located at 157 West 74th Street in the 1920s, and in Stamford, Connecticut, in the 1940s.

== Early life and career ==
Steinback was sent to Germany for his elementary education. He later studied at the Polytechnic Institute of Brooklyn, New York City, and later received a B.S. from Columbia School of Architecture in New York City, class of 1900. After graduation, he traveled throughout Europe, spent three years in Germany, and one year in France working for Atelier Bernard.

He claimed at the end of his career to have started his practice in 1903 but this may have been a mistake, as he had earlier claimed 1904 as his first year. In 1904, he entered into a partnership with fellow Columbia graduate Robert J. Reiley. The firm, known as Reiley and Steinback continued in practice from 1904 through 1913 and was responsible for many buildings for Roman Catholic clients throughout the Eastern United States.

== Architectural practice ==
After the partnership was dissolved, both men went on to lengthy careers designing Roman Catholic churches. He was licensed to practice architecture in New Jersey in 1905, and in New York in 1916, suggesting he only had to get his New York license after his partnership was dissolved with the more successful Reiley. He was an associate of the American Institute of Architects until 1931. He was also a member of the Associated Stamford Architects.

== Personal life ==
Steinback was active in civic affairs and was for many years a member of the Stamford City Planning Board. He died at Stamford Hospital on September 21, 1959, from injuries sustained when he was struck by an automobile.

Unlike many other of his contemporaries, Steinback continued to work in private practice during World War I, not completing any government service until World War II when he worked on engineering on Stewart's Field and at Rye Lake Airport.

== Work as Reiley and Steinback (1904-1913) ==
- 1908: The Basilica of St. Stanislaus, Bishop & Martyr, Chicopee, Massachusetts
- 1909: Our Lady of Mt. Carmel, Bayonne, NJ
- 1912: Church of the Queen of All Saints, at Lafayette and Vanderbilt Avenues in Fort Greene, Brooklyn,
- St. Stanislaus Church, Adams, Massachusetts
- St. Stanislaus' Church, Meriden, Connecticut
- St. Aloysius' Church, Great Neck, New York

== Works as Gustave E. Steinback (1913-1959) ==
- 1917: Blessed Sacrament Church, Manhattan, New York City,
- 1915: St. Patrick's Church, Bayshore, New York
- 1918: Cathedral College, Brooklyn, New York
- 1918: Church of St. Anselm, 151st Street at Robbins Avenue, Mott Haven, Bronx, New York City
- 1920: St. Ephram's School and Hall, Brooklyn, New York
- 1921: St. Michael's Church, Brooklyn, New York
- 1921: (former) Church of Our Lady of Guadalupe, 14th Street, Manhattan, New York City, facade by Steinback
- 1922: St. Monica's School and Convent, Jamaica, Queens, New York City
- 1922: St. Ignatius School and Hall, Hicksville, New York
- 1922: St. Eamun's School and Hall, Brooklyn, New York
- 1923: Church of the Presentation, Queens, New York
- 1924: St. Mels High School, Chicago, Illinois
- 1925: Quigley Memorial Seminary, Chicago, Illinois (with Zachary Taylor Davis of Chicago)
- 1925: St. Pancras' Church, Brooklyn, New York
- 1928: St. Joseph College for Women, Brooklyn, New York
- 1928: Church of Our Lady Queen of Martyrs, 91 Arden Street, Washington Heights, Manhattan, New York City
- 1928: St. Joan of Arc Church, Jackson Heights, Queens, New York City, never built, only the crypt/lower church completed
- 1931: St. Benedict's School, Bronx, New York
- 1932: St. Bernard's School and Rectory, White Plains, New York
- 1939: St. John the Evangelist's Church and Parish School, Leonia, New Jersey
- 1949: Church of Immaculate Heart of Mary, Scarsdale, New York
- 1949: Church of the Annunciation, Crestwood, New York
- 1949-51: Our Lady Queen of Martyrs Parish School
- 1950: St. Cecilia's Church, Stamford, Connecticut
- 1951: Mary Queen of Heaven School, Brooklyn, New York
- 1951: St. Paul the Apostle School, Yonkers, New York
- 1951: Saints Peter and Paul Church and School, Mount Vernon, New York
- 1956: St. Catherine of Sienna's Church, Riverside, Connecticut

== Gallery ==
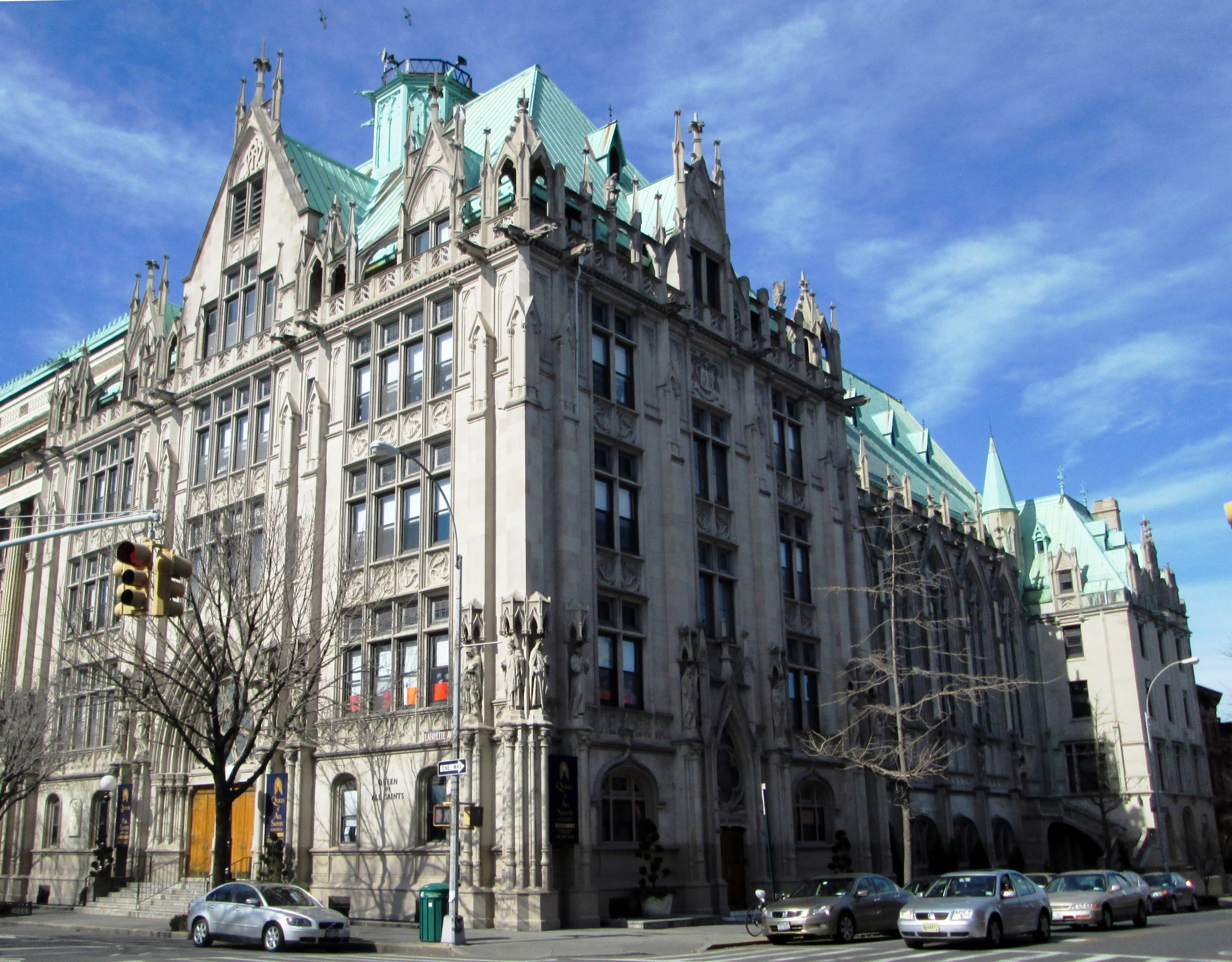
Queen of All Saints, Brooklyn (1910–13)

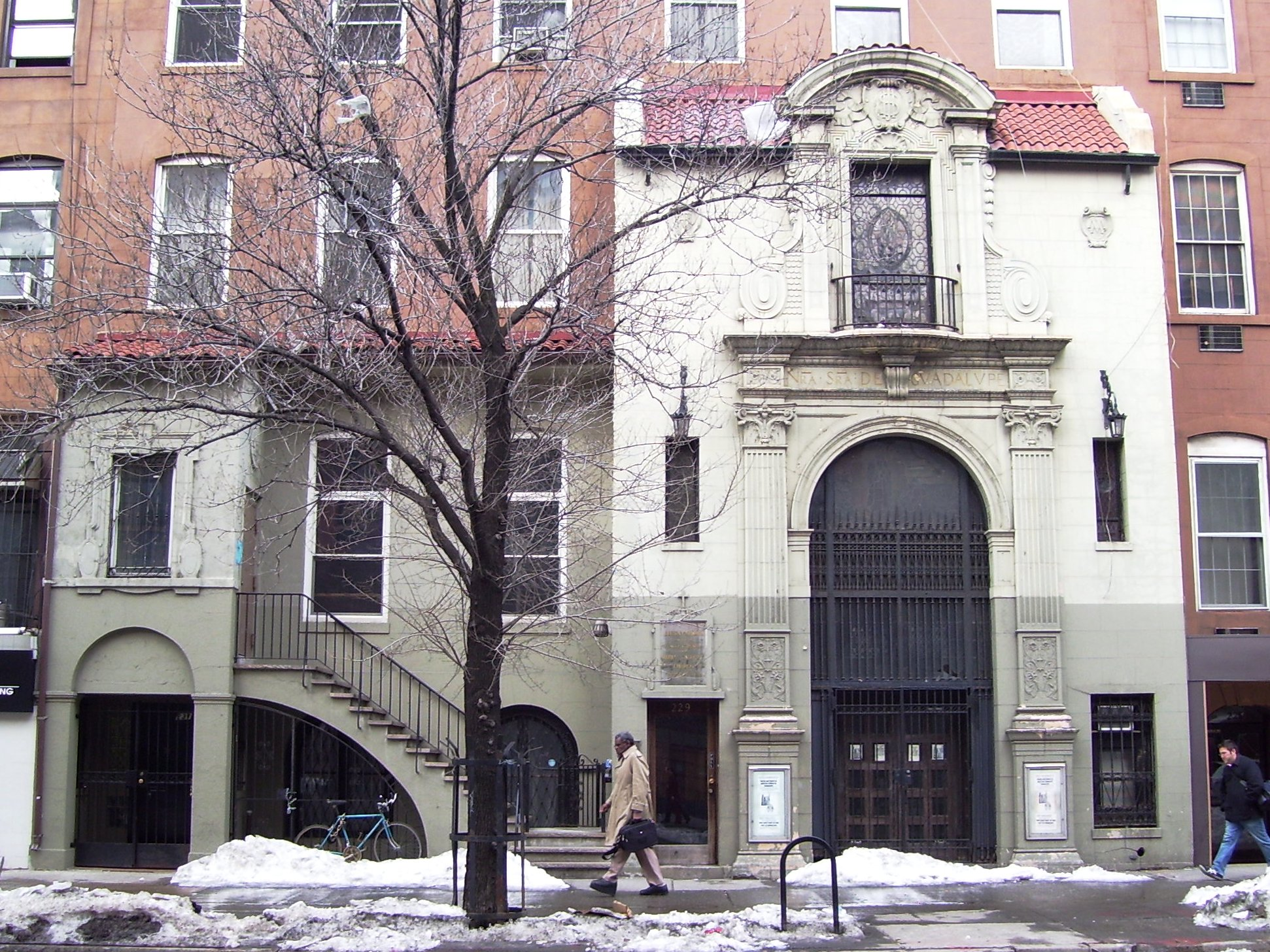
The facade of the former Church of Our Lady of Guadalupe, 14th Street, Manhattan (1921)

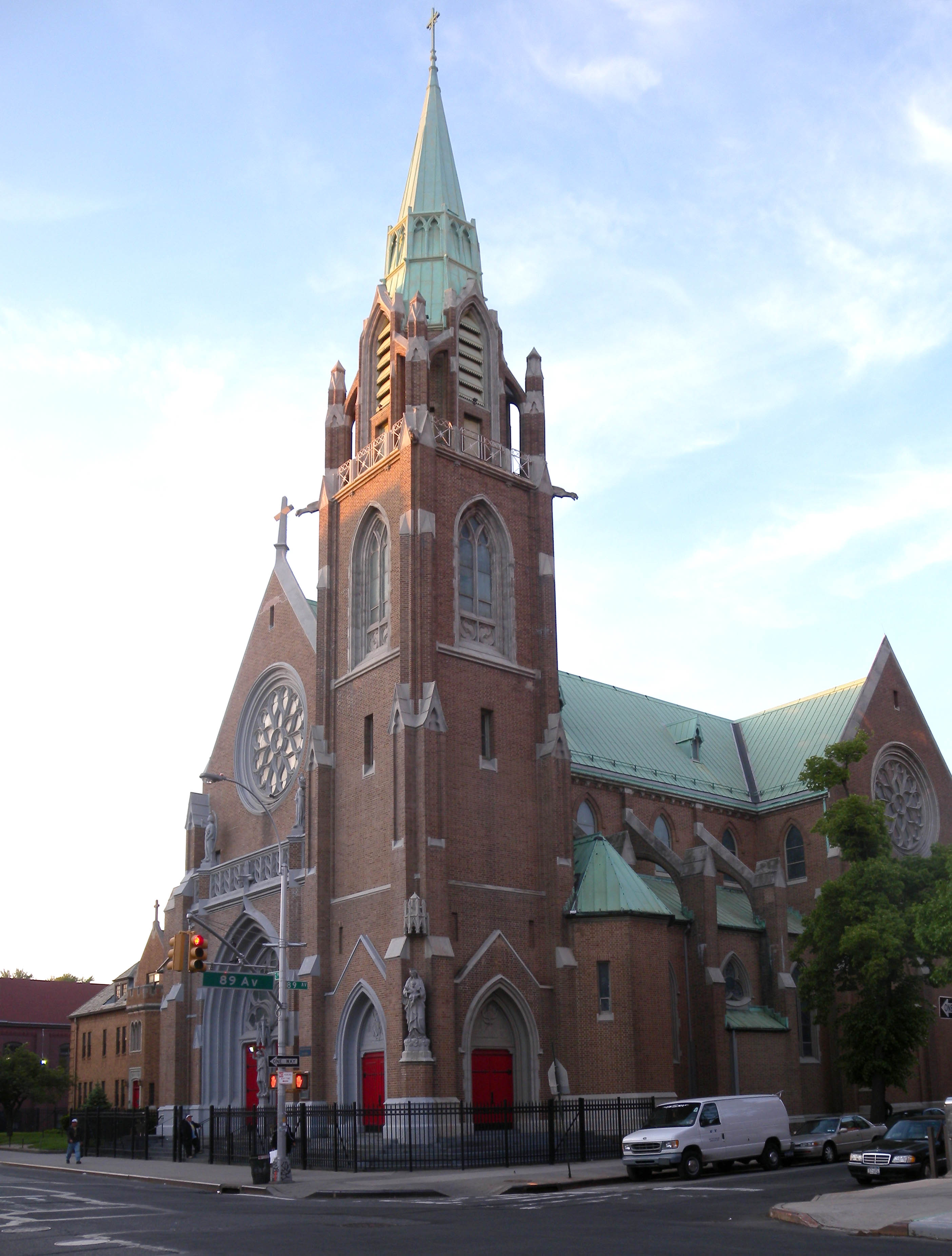
Church of Presentation of Blessed Virgin Mary, Jamaica, Queens, (1923)

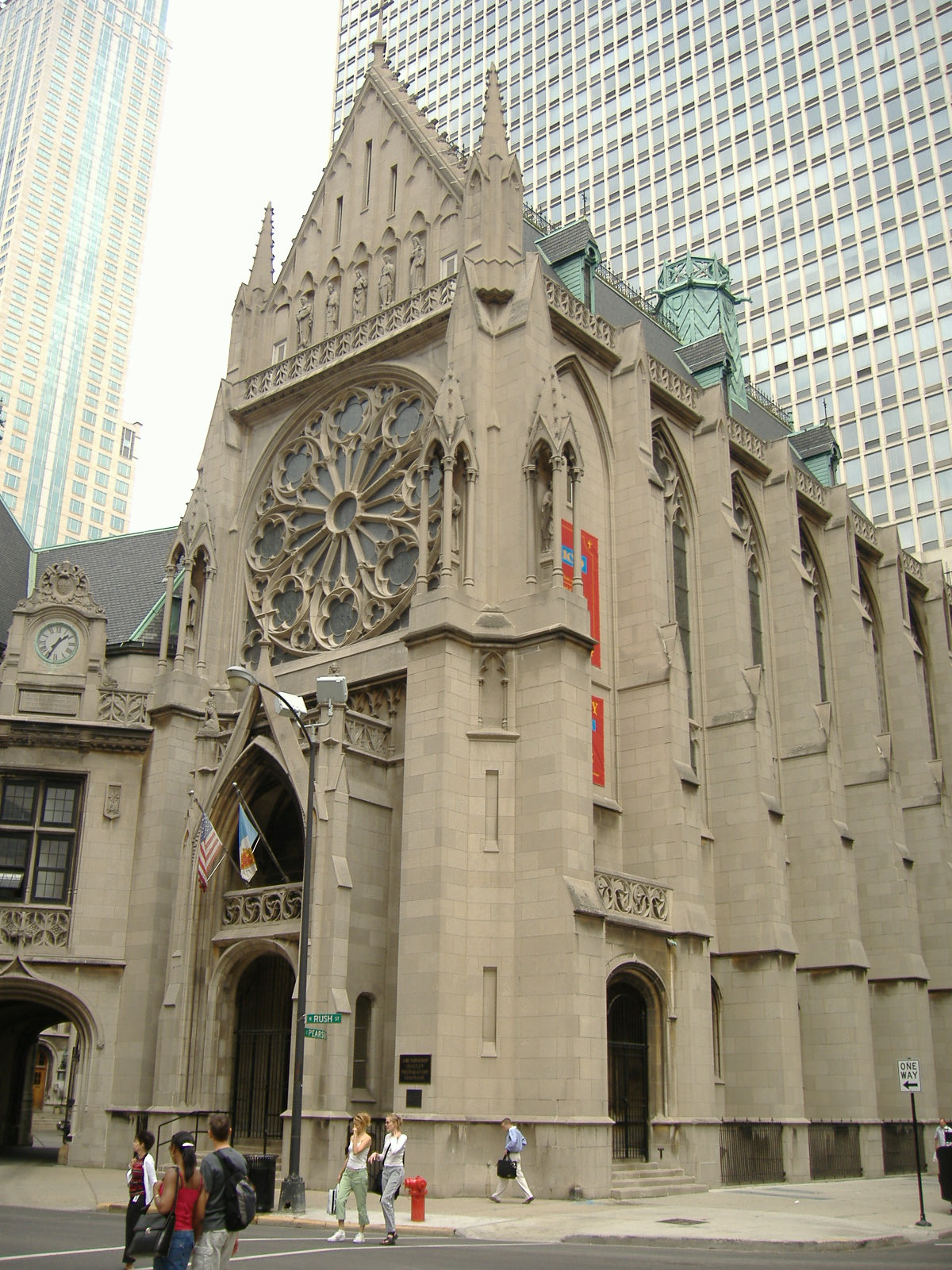
Archbishop Quigley Preparatory Seminary Chapel, Chicago (1925)
