= St. Catherine of Siena Church (Riverside, Connecticut) =

Coordinates: 41°02′27″N 73°35′12″W

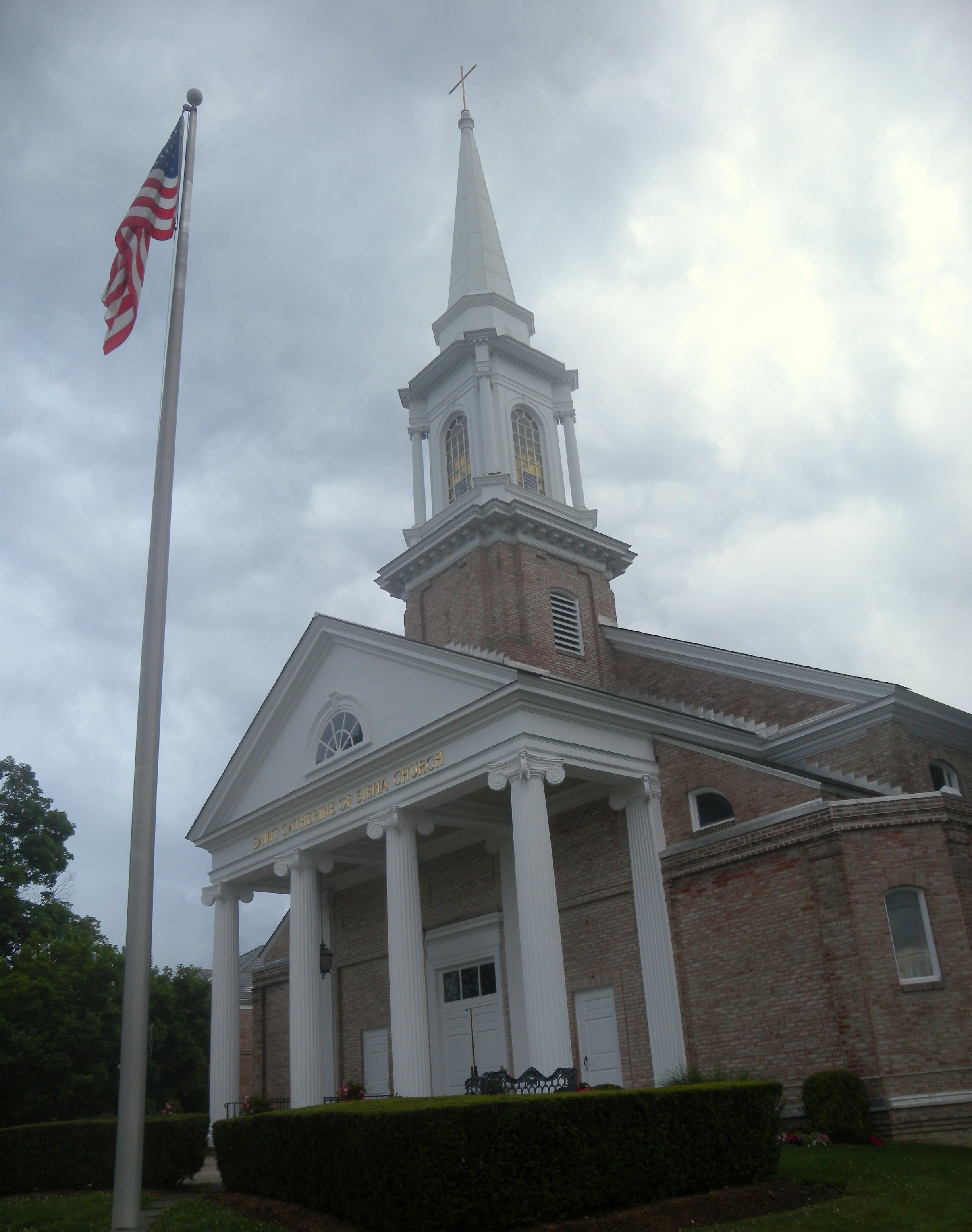
- St. Catherine of Siena Church
- Location: 4 Riverside Avenue; Riverside, Connecticut
- Country: United States
- Denomination: Roman Catholic
- Website: www.stc-sta.org

History
- Founded: May 8, 1913
- Dedicated: 1914

Architecture
- Architect: Gustave E. Steinback

Administration
- Province: Hartford
- Diocese: Bridgeport
- Parish: Parish of St. Catherine's and St. Agnes

Clergy
- Bishop: Frank J. Caggiano
- Priest: Rev. Christopher Perella
- Pastor: Fr. Michael L. Dunn

St. Catherine of Siena is a Roman Catholic church in the Riverside neighborhood of Greenwich, Connecticut. It is now part of the Parish of St. Catherine of Siena and St. Agnes within the Diocese of Bridgeport.

St. Catherine's has an annual carnival for a week in June or July.

== History ==
The original church was established by the then Bishop of Hartford, John Joseph Nilan on May 8, 1913. Nicholas P. Coleman was appointed as the first pastor and helped construct the new church. The church building and rectory were subsequently dedicated the following year. The third pastor, John F. X. Walsh, was influential in guiding the construction of the church at its current location. The very large Colonial-style church was built in 1956 to the designs of the noted New York City and Stamford based ecclesiastical architect Gustave E. Steinback. Steinback was a renowned architect and designer of many distinguished churches in New York City and Chicago, and St. Catherine's was his last church design before his death in 1959.

The parish of St. Catherine of Siena and the parish of St. Agnes were canonically merged July 1, 2019. A procession from St. Agnes to St. Catherine to mark the occasion was held on November 24, followed by a Mass celebrated by Bishop Frank Caggiano.

== Mass Schedule ==
The following is the mass schedule for masses held at the St. Catherine campus location:

- Saturday: 5:00 PM
- Sunday: 7:30 AM, 9:00 AM (Family Mass), 10:30 AM, 11:00 AM (French Mass, 2nd Sunday), 11:00 AM (Italian Mass, 3rd Sunday of Month) 5:00 PM
- Daily Mass: Monday, Tuesday, Wednesday (in Lent), Thursday, and Friday - 7:00 AM, 5:15 PM (In chapel)
