= Basilica of St. Stanislaus (Chicopee, Massachusetts) =

Roman Catholic basilica in Massachusetts, United States of America

Coordinates: 42°8′51.4″N 72°35′42.0″W

Basilica of St. Stanislaus, Bishop and Martyr
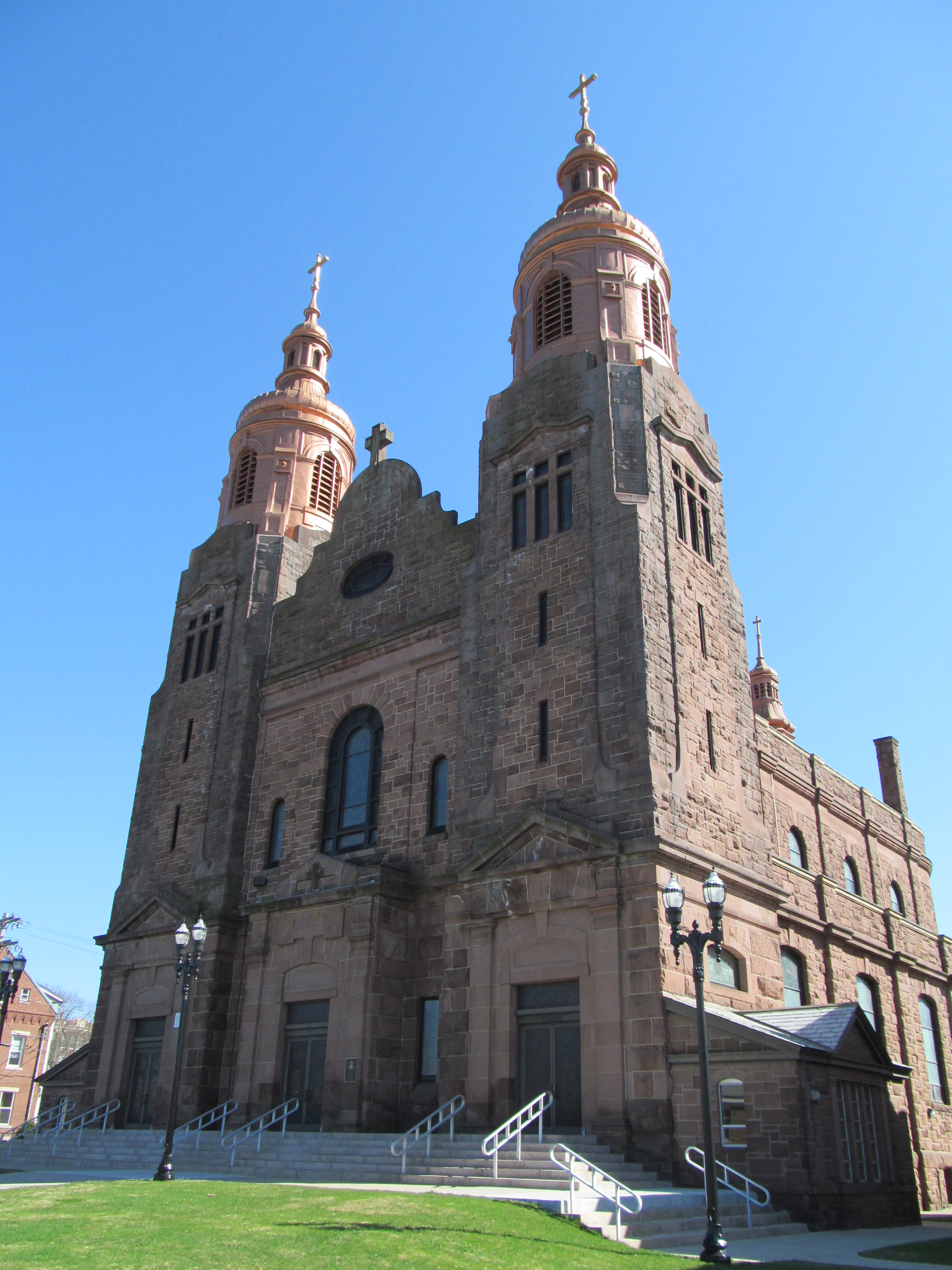
- Basilica of St. Stanislaus
- Interactive map of the Basilica of St. Stanislaus, Bishop and Martyr area

General information
- Location: Chicopee, Massachusetts, United States of America
- Completed: 1908
- Client: Roman Catholic Diocese of Springfield in Massachusetts

Design and construction
- Architects: Robert J. Reiley and Gustave E. Steinback of the firm Reiley and Steinback

Basilica of St. Stanislaus, Bishop and Martyr
- Basilica of St. Stanislaus, Bishop and Martyr
- Country: United States
- Denomination: Roman Catholic

Architecture
- Architect(s): Robert J. Reiley and Gustave E. Steinback of the firm Reiley and Steinback

Administration
- Diocese: Roman Catholic Diocese of Springfield in Massachusetts
- Parish: Parish of St. Stanislaus, Bishop and Martyr

The Basilica of St. Stanislaus is a Roman Catholic minor basilica dedicated to Stanislaus of Szczepanów located in Chicopee, Massachusetts. The church is under the circumscription of the Roman Catholic Diocese of Springfield in Massachusetts and serves St. Stanislaus Bishop & Martyr's Parish. The church was completed in 1908 to the designs of Robert J. Reiley and Gustave E. Steinback of the firm Reiley and Steinback. The basilica was decreed on June 25, 1991.
