= Church of St. Anselm and St. Roch (Bronx) =

Historic church in New York, United States

The Church of St. Anselm
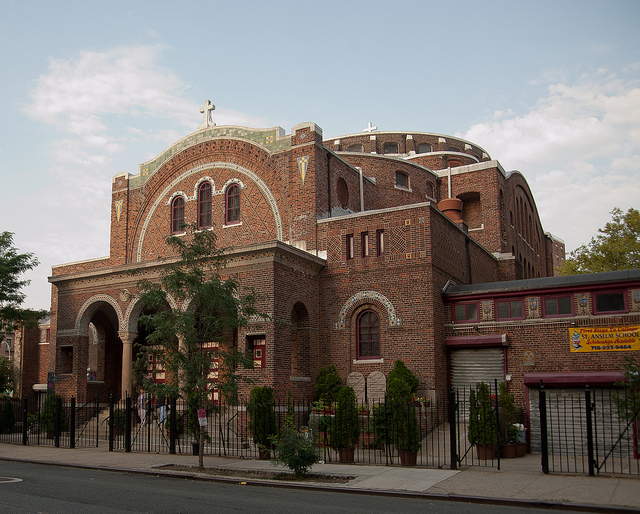
- Interactive map of the The Church of St. Anselm area

General information
- Architectural style: Byzantine Revival style, Romanesque Revival
- St. Anselm's Roman Catholic Church and School
- U.S. National Register of Historic Places
- Location within New York City Location within New York Location within the United States
- Location: 683 Tinton Ave., Bronx, New York
- Coordinates: 40°48′58″N 73°54′20″W
- Area: 1.51 acres (0.61 ha)
- Built: 1892, 1908, 1917, 1956
- Architect: Steinback, Gustave E., Kirby, John E.
- Architectural style: Byzantine Revival, Classical Revival
- NRHP reference No.: 13001151
- Added to NRHP: February 5, 2014
- Location: Mott Haven, Bronx, New York City, United States
- Completed: 1918
- Client: Roman Catholic Archdiocese of New York

Design and construction
- Architects: Anton Koster (according to the AIA Guide to NYC 2010); Gustave E. Steinback (according to the AIA Guide to NYC 1978 and Steinback himself)

The Church of St. Anselm and St. Roch is a Catholic parish church in the Archdiocese of New York, located at 685 Tinton Avenue in the Mott Haven neighborhood of the Bronx in New York City. It was established in 1891 and is staffed by the Order of Augustinian Recollects. Previously it was staffed by Benedictine monks.

== Building ==
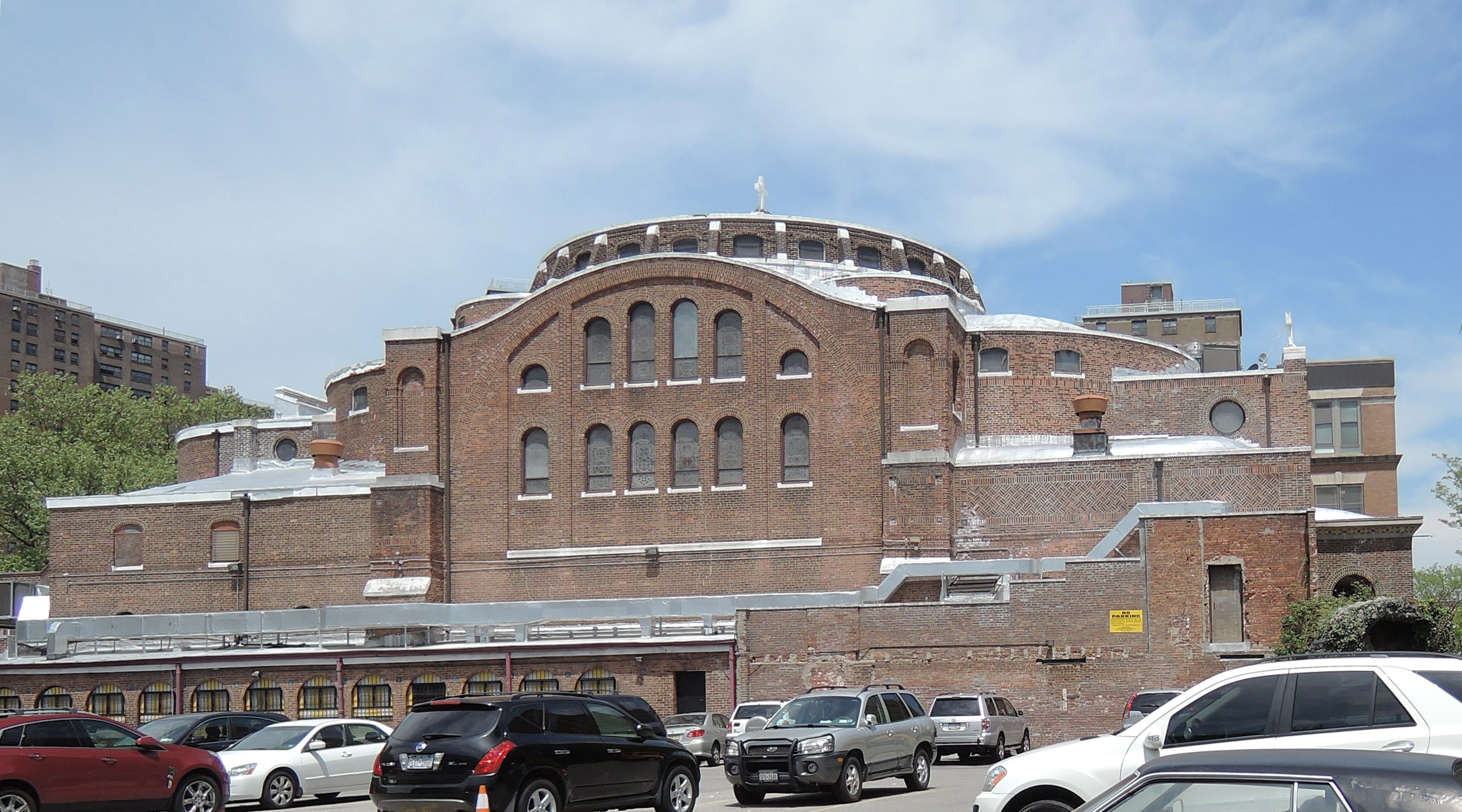

The present church was built 1918 in the Byzantine Revival style. Its design is inspired by the Hagia Sophia in Istanbul, Turkey. It is an approximately two-story brick building topped by a large dome surrounded by a series of smaller domes. The designs was credited to Gustave Steinback and his noted ecclesiastical architectural firm by the AIA Guide to NYC (1978) and according to Steinback's own claim to the American Institute of Architects for its registry filings. However, the AIA Guide to NYC (2010) has revised the architect of the design to Anton Kloster. Other guides have also attributed the work to Kloster. It is possible that Kloster worked for Steinback at the time.

The church interior, supported by Romanesque Corinthian marble columns, is decorated with geometric mosaics. Art historian Annie Labatt sees the influence of the Archbasilica of St. John Lateran in the apse.

The adjacent school is a four-story, brick building with terra cotta accents in the Classical Revival style.

The church and school were added to the National Register of Historic Places in 2014.

== Parish ==
The parish was organized in July 1891 to serve the German Catholic community and entrusted to the Benedictines. The first pastor was Abbot Alexius Edelbrock. It became a dependent priory of St. John's Abbey in Minnesota. The original church on 151st St. was dedicated in 1893. In 1908 a brick school was built, which opened for classes in 1909. It was originally staffed by the Dominican Sisters of Blauvelt. In 1912 a playground was added, probably the first attached to a Catholic school in New York.

In addition to their parish work, the monks at St. Anselm's also served as chaplains to the Corpus Christi Monastery of Dominican nuns at Hunt's Point, the Sevilla Children's Home, and supervised the order's mission in the Bahamas. In the early 1900s, the parish sponsored a Fife and Drum Corps.

Augustinian Recollects took over responsibility for administering the parish; its ethnic make-up has evolved to reflect Spanish and Latin American heritage.

=== Pastors ===
- Alexius Edelbrock O.S.B., 1891 - September 1907
- Bernard Kevenhorster O.S.B. (prior), October 1907 -
- Fr Andres Alava, O.A.R., 1985 to 1992, (admin)
- Fr.Antonio Palacios O.A.R (2003-2016)

(Pastor)

==== Church of St. Anselm and St. Roch ====
Fr.Antonio Palacios O.A.R (2015-2016) Fr. Enrique Salvo (2016-2021). Fr. Micheal Eguino (2022–Present) fr. damian baker was the pastor in the 1950s to early 1960s

== Church of St. Roch ==
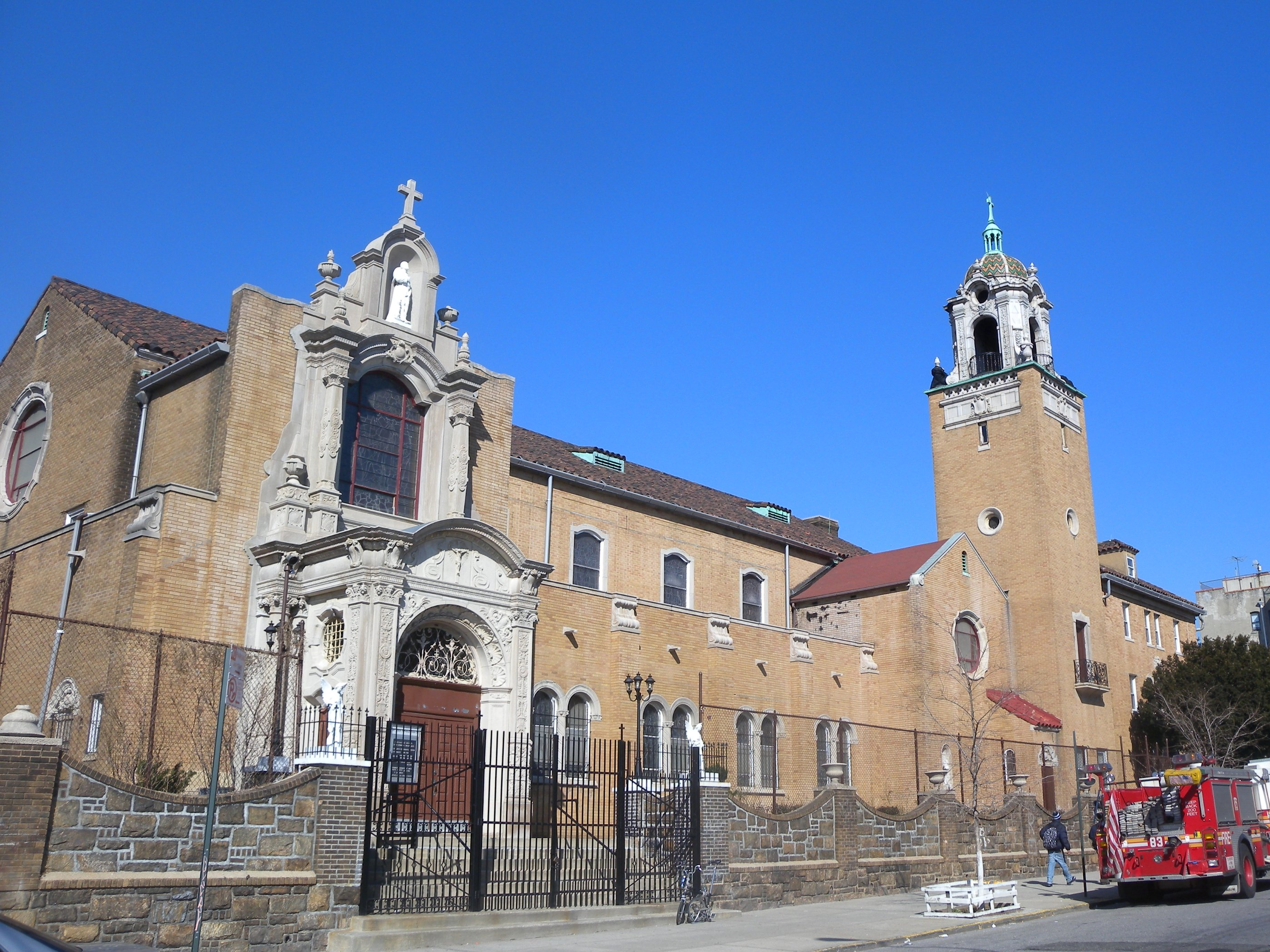
St. Roch 525 Wales Av

The Church of St. Roch was founded in 1899 as a national parish to serve Italian Catholics. The first pastor was Rev. John Milo. The original church building was located on 150th St. near Robbins Ave. Later, a larger church was constructed on Wales Ave. The new church, designed by Anthony J. DePace of DePace and Juster, was dedicated in 1932. For many years in the mid-twentieth century the parish put on a Passion Play. The parish's ethnic composition developed to reflect immigrants from Puerto Rico, the Dominican Republic, Ecuador and Mexico. In 1974 the archdiocese transferred parish administration to the Augustinian Recollects of the Province of St. Nicholas of Tolentine, based in Madrid. From 1985 to 1992, due to low attendance, St. Roch's became a mission parish of St. Anselm's, also in the care of the Recollects.

In 2015 the parish of St. Roch was merged with St. Anselm's. Effective November 2017, the St. Roch's church building was desacralized.

=== Pastors ===
- Fr John Milo, 1899
- Msgr. Ignatius Cirelli
- Fr George A. Giammarino, 1968-1974
- Fr Gregorio Garcia, O.A.R., 1974 to 1976
- Fr Angelsan Ufrasio, O.A.R., 1976 to 1979
- Fr Patrick O'Hagan, O.A.R., 1979 to 1985
- Fr Andres Alava, O.A.R., 1985 to 1992, (admin)
- Fr Ignacio Basterra, O.A.R., 1992 to 1995
- Fr Francisco Oviedo, O.A.R., 1995
