= Our Lady Queen of Martyrs Church (Manhattan) =

Roman Catholic church in New York City, USA

Coordinates: 40°51′50″N 73°55′41″W

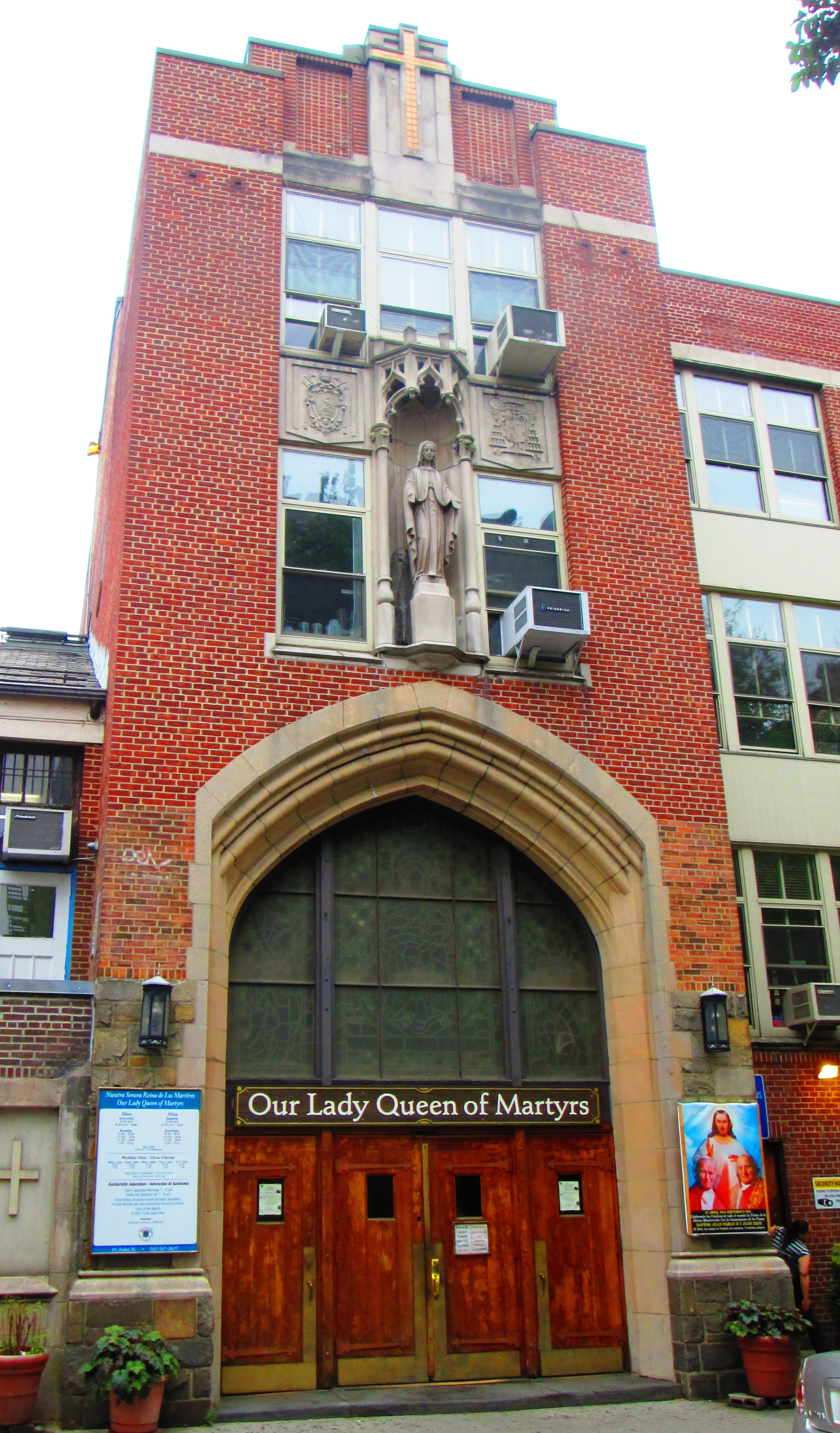
- (2014)
- Interactive map of the Our Lady Queen of Martyrs Church area

General information
- Location: Washington Heights, Manhattan, New York City, United States
- Construction started: 1927
- Completed: 1928
- Cost: $160,000 (1928), $400,000 (1949)
- Client: Roman Catholic Archdiocese of New York

Design and construction
- Architect: Gustave E. Steinback

Website
- https://olqmchurch.com/

Our Lady Queen of Martyrs Church, located at 81 Arden Street at Dongan Place, between Broadway and Sherman Avenue in the Inwood neighborhood of Manhattan, New York City, is a Roman Catholic parish church in the Roman Catholic Archdiocese of New York. The parish was established in 1927 and a church was built in 1928 to designs by Gustave E. Steinback.

== School ==
A temporary school was begun in the church's rectory building in 1932, and plans were made for a permanent school building, but it was not built at the time because of the Great Depression. In 1934, however, an auditorium and temporary classrooms were built. A four-story school, also designed by Gustave E. Steinback, was built in 1949–50.

Franciscan Missionary Sisters of the Sacred Heart originally staffed the school from 1932 until 1980. Since then, it has been staffed by lay teachers.
