= Dominican University New York =

Catholic university in Orangeburg, New York, US

Coordinates: 41.0541°N 73.9525°W

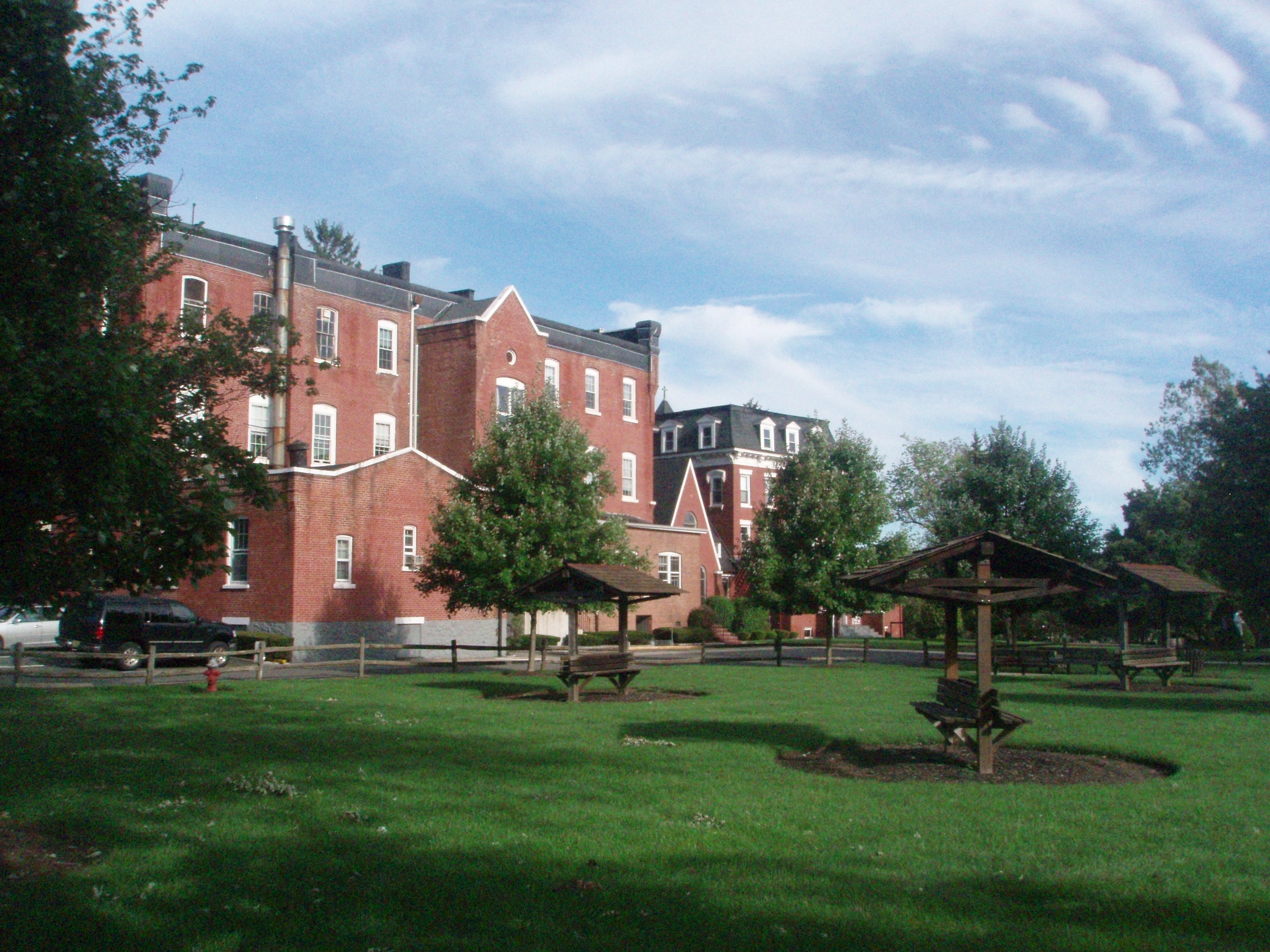
- View of the college and campus in 2011
- Type: Private university
- Established: 1952; 74 years ago
- Accreditation: MSCHE
- Academic affiliations: ACCU; NAICU; CIC
- President: Manuel Martínez
- Faculty: 65 full-time and 121 part-time (2024)
- Students: 1,396 (2024)
- Undergraduates: 1,115 (2024)
- Postgraduates: 281 (2024)
- Location: Orangeburg, New York, United States
- Campus: Suburban
- Colors: Red and black
- Nickname: Chargers
- Sporting affiliations: NCAA Division II – CACC, ECC
- Mascot: Charlie the Charger
- Website: duny.edu
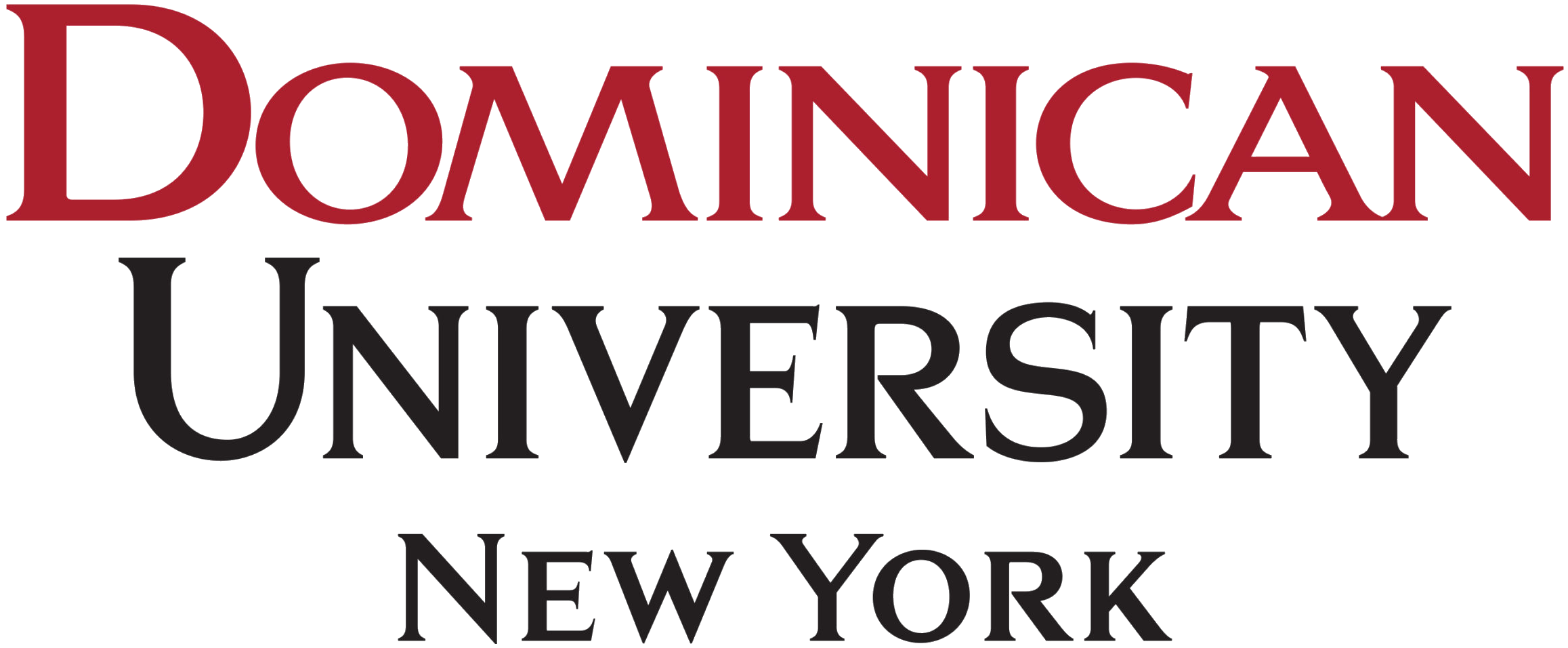

Dominican University New York is a private Catholic university in Orangeburg, New York, United States. It is chartered by the Board of Regents of the University of the State of New York and accredited by the Middle States Commission on Higher Education. Its 64-acre (260,000 m^{2}) suburban campus in Orangeburg is 17 miles (27 km) from New York City in Rockland County.

== History ==
Dominican University New York was founded as Dominican College of Blauvelt in 1952 by the Dominican Sisters of Blauvelt to offer a teacher preparation program for religious women. Five years later, the college was opened to lay students. In 1967, it became fully coeducational.

On May 17, 2022, the New York State Board of Regents approved the name change from Dominican College to Dominican University New York.

Today it is an independent, four-year and master’s-level liberal arts university for men and women, chartered by the Board of Regents of the University of the State of New York and fully accredited by the Middle States Association of Colleges and Secondary Schools, led by Dr. Manuel Martínez the first layperson to serve as University President.

The University fully participates in the Yellow Ribbon Program and offers other programs and service to veterans and active military students.

In addition, U.S. News & World Report ranked Dominican University New York a Top Performer on Social Mobility on its 2022-2023 Best Colleges list.

=== Presidents ===
- Mary Eileen O'Brien, 1979–1987
- Kathleen Sullivan, 1987–1997
- Mary Eileen O'Brien, 1997–2024
- Manuel Martinez, 2024–present

== Academics ==
Dominican University New York offers undergraduate and graduate education in the liberal arts, sciences, business, nursing, education, occupational therapy, physical therapy, social work, and other professional fields.

The university is organized into six academic divisions:

- Allied Health
- Business, Innovation, & Leadership
- Humanities & Social Sciences
- Math & Sciences
- Nursing, and
- Teacher Education & Social Work.

Academic Programs offered by the University include:

- Art (Minor)
- Biology
- Business Management
- Chemistry (Minor)
- Communication Studies
- Criminal Justice
- Economics (Minor)
- English
- Environmental Studies
- Ethnic Diversity Studies (Minor)
- Evening BSN program
- Film Studies (Minor)
- Finance
- Gender Studies (Minor)
- Health Sciences
- History
- Humanities
- Human Resources (Minor)
- Information Technology
- Mathematics
- Marketing
- Nursing
- Philosophy (Minor)
- Public Health Informatics and Technology – PHIT (minor)
- Pre-Athletic Training
- Pre-Occupational Therapy
- Pre-Physical Therapy
- Psychology
- Public Health Informatics and Technology (minor)
- Religious Studies (Minor)
- Sales (Minor)
- Social Sciences
- Social Work
- Spanish (Minor)
- Sports Management (Minor)
- Teacher Education
- Theatre (Minor)

== Athletics ==
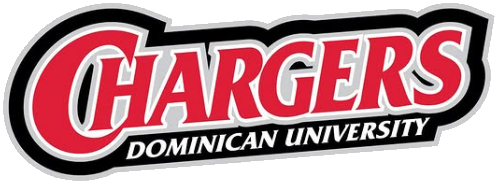
Chargers wordmark

The Dominican University athletic teams are called the Chargers. The university is a member of the Division II ranks of the National Collegiate Athletic Association (NCAA), primarily competing in the Central Atlantic Collegiate Conference (CACC) for most of its sports since the 1982–83 academic year. They are also a member of the East Coast Conference for some sports.

Dominican University New York competes in 22 intercollegiate varsity sports. Men's sports include baseball, basketball, cross country, golf, lacrosse, rowing, soccer, tennis, track & field and volleyball (10); women's sports include basketball, bowling, cross country, flag football, field hockey, lacrosse, rowing, soccer, softball, tennis, track & field and volleyball (12).

== Notable alumni ==
- Gerald P. Mallon (1979), professor of social work
- Mary Eileen O'Brien, president of Dominican University 1997–2024
- Mary Kay Vyskocil (1980), judge of the United States District Court for the Southern District of New York
- William Wise III (2016), basketball player
