= Sacramentines =

The Sisters of the Blessed Sacrament and Our Lady (also known as the Sacramentines) is an enclosed religious order and a reform of the Dominican Order devoted to the perpetual adoration of the Blessed Sacrament. The congregation was founded in Marseille in 1659 by a Dominican priest, Anthony Le Quieu.

== Foundation ==
Anthony Le Quieu (1601–1676) was born at Paris. He entered the Order of Friars Preachers in the Rue St. Honoré, in 1622, and was in due time made master of novices first in his own monastery, at Avignon in 1634, and later prior of the convent at Paris. In 1639, Le Quieu established a religious house for women, exclusively devoted to the practice of Perpetual Adoration at Marseille.

Anne Negrel was named the first Superior. The definitive establishment took place in 1659-60, when Etienne de Puget, Bishop of Marseille, erected them into a congregation. The final formalities for the approval of the order having been concluded in Rome (1680), Pope Innocent XI expedited a papal brief, which could not be put in execution because of a change of bishop.

It was not till after the death of the founder, that the constitutions were approved by Pope Innocent XII in 1693, who authorized the nuns to take solemn vows and bound them to enclosure, That same year the Apostolic Process was opened for the canonization of its founder.

Another foundation was made at Bollène in 1725.

== French Revolution period ==
During the period of the Terrors of the French Revolution, the monastery at Bollène, Couvent du Saint-Sacrement, saw 13 of its members executed by guillotine. from 5 to 26 July 1794.

- Anne-Andrée Minutte
- Élisabeth Verchière
- Madeleine-Thérèse Talieu
- Marguerite-Rose de Gordon
- Marguerite-Thérèse Charensol
- Marie Cluse
- Marie-Anne Béguin-Royal
- Marie-Clotilde Blanc
- Marie-Elisabeth Pélissier
- Marie-Gabrielle-Françoise-Suzanne de Gaillard de Lavaldène
- Marie-Marguerite Bonnet
- Rosalie-Clotilde Bes
- Thérèse-Henriette Faurie

They were beatified May 10, 1925 by Pope Pius XI.

The Mother Superior, de La Fare, having escaped the guillotine, gathered together the remnant of her community in 1802 and resumed their work. A foundation was made at Avignon in 1807. The same year a Sacramentine of Marseille founded a monastery at Aix-en-Provence.

== Nineteenth century ==
In 1816 the monastery in Marseille was reopened, de La Fare made a new foundation at Carpentras. In 1859 six religious sisters of Aix founded a house at Bernay, Normandy, and in 1863 a number of sisters from Bollène founded a Monastery of Perpetual Adoration at Taunton, England. Oxford also had a foundation.

All the houses of this Order are autonomous and dependent on the Ordinary of the diocese, who is their superior. In consequence of the legal position of religious congregations in France, the Sacramentines of Marseille were obliged to abandon their monastery. The four other houses in southern France were authorized by the Government.

== Twentieth century ==
The Sacramentines of Bernay at the time of the expulsion, July, 1903, were compelled to close their boarding-school and go into exile. Thirteen of the sisters retired to Belgium, and founded a house at Hal. The rest of their community settled in Wales at Whitson Court, Newport, Monmouthshire; they had left by the 1930s.

In March 1911, the Sacramentines were permitted by John Murphy Farley, the Archbishop of New York, to open a monastery in Holy Trinity Parish in Yonkers, New York. They purchased the Ethan Flagg House in 1915 and added a monastery and school for girls in 1922. They closed the school in the 1980s and relocated to Warwick, New York in 1991. It was added to the National Register of Historic Places in 1998. In 1996, the Sacramentine nuns established Blessed Sacrament Monastery in Edgemont, New York. The building was originally a single-family home which they purchased from the Paulist Fathers; as of 2018, it housed four nuns.

== Present Day ==
There are six nuns at the Monastery of the Blessed Sacrament in Halle in Flemish Brabant. There are also a number of monasteries in France. In the United States Blessed Sacrament Monastery is in the Edgemont section of Scarsdale, New York; Sacramentine Monastery is in Conway, Michigan. In addition to their work of prayer, some nuns support the community by making communion hosts or altar linens. The nuns welcome the public to join them at Mass and host private retreats for individuals.

In 1941, the Sacramentines who were re-established in Marseille joined part of the Assumptionist Congregations, the Orantes of the Assumption.

== Sources ==
The entry cites:

- Helyot, Histoire des Ordres, IV, 421 sq.;
- Max Heimbucher, Die Orden und Kongregationen, s.v. Sakramentinerinnen.
