= Ethan Flagg House-Blessed Sacrament Monastery =

Historic house in New York, United States

- U.S. National Register of Historic Places
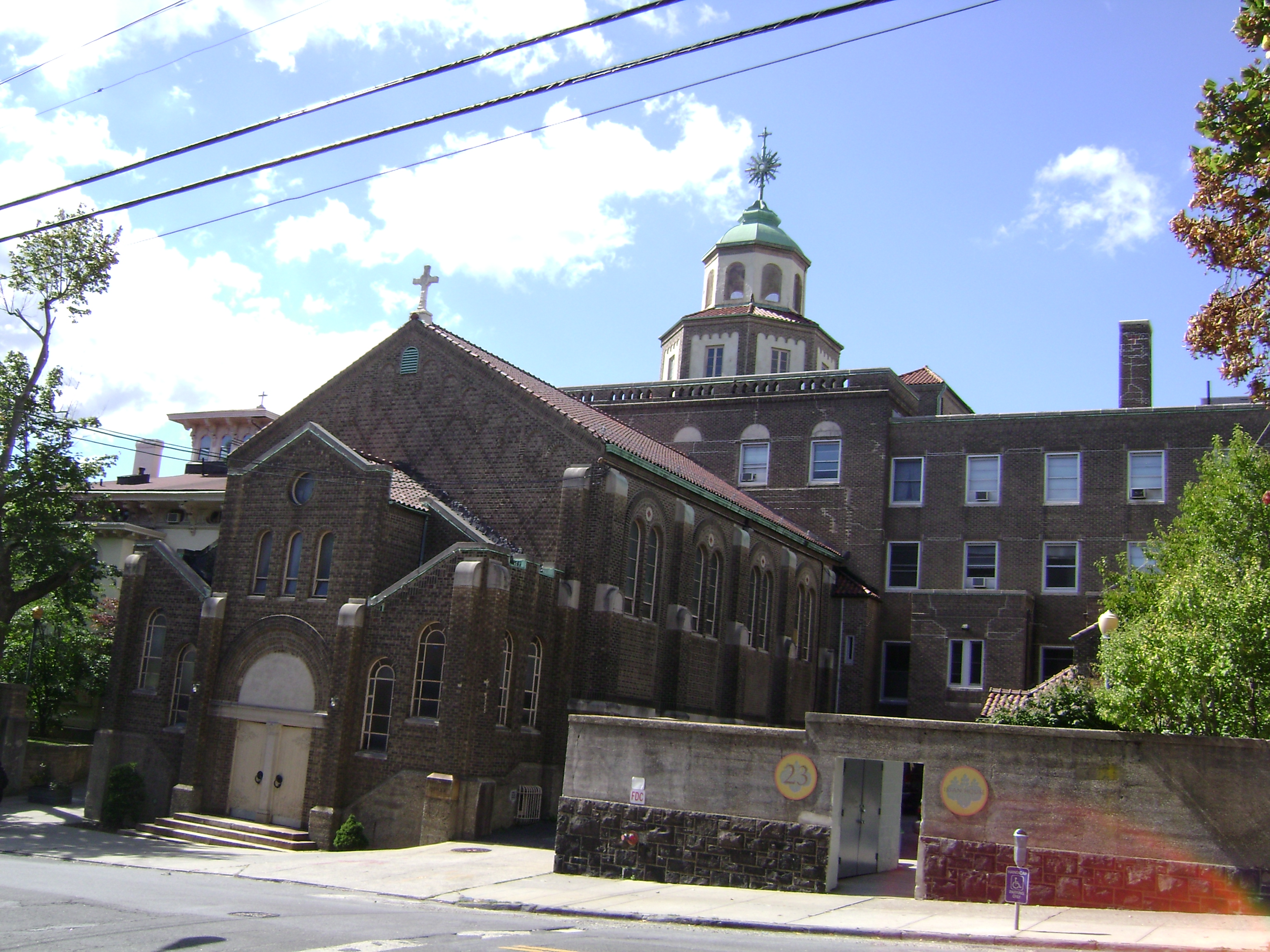

- Location within New York Location within the United States
- Location: 23 Park Ave., Yonkers, New York
- Coordinates: 40°56′25″N 73°53′34″W
- Area: 1.6 acres (0.65 ha)
- Built: 1855
- Architect: Stewart, J and G; Clermont, John B.
- Architectural style: Italian Villa, Neo-Romanesque
- NRHP reference No.: 98001075
- Added to NRHP: August 12, 1998

Ethan Flagg House-Blessed Sacrament Monastery is a historic home and monastery located at Yonkers, Westchester County, New York. It was built in 1855, with additions made in 1922 and in 1954. The house is a two-story, five-bay wide brick building on a rock faced, random ashlar base in the Italianate style. It has a prominent square cupola and a one-story, wooden porch set on brick piers across the front facade. The four story, brick monastery building was built in 1922. It has a two-story rear wing with conservatory and includes a former chapel. It features an octagonal cupola and has some cast stone and stucco trim. The 1954 addition connects the house and monastery building. The original house was built by industrialist Ethan Flagg (1820-1884), a leading citizen of Yonkers. The property was a residence until its purchase in 1915 by the Sacramentine order of nuns. The academy closed in 1975 and the nuns relocated to Warwick, New York in 1991. In 1996, the property was sold for use as a medical and social service center for people with HIV run by the Greyston Foundation.

It was added to the National Register of Historic Places in 1998.
