= Dominican Sisters of Blauvelt =

The Dominican Sisters of Blauvelt are a religious congregation within the Dominican Order of religious sisters founded in 1890. They are based in the town of Blauvelt, New York, a northern suburb of New York City. Their traditional service has been childcare, both through teaching and caring for orphans.

== Early foundations ==
Mary Sammon was born and baptized on September 17, 1843 in Terryglass, County Tipperary, Ireland. She was the seventh of eight children. In 1850, she and two of her older sisters emigrated to the United States with their uncle and settled on the Lower East Side of Manhattan. At that period, it was a large center of German immigration. Mary and her sisters supported themselves through domestic work, serving German Catholic families in the neighborhood.

In 1862, Mother Hyacinth Scheininger, O.P., was sent from Holy Cross Convent in the Williamsburgh section of Brooklyn in order to teach German girls in Lower Manhattan. It was there that Mary met the cloistered Dominican nuns, who had come from Ratisbon, Germany, to care for children of the German-speaking immigrants to America. She joined the nuns and received the Dominican habit in 1873, at which time she took the name Sister Mary Ann .

By that time, a separate convent on Second Street in Brooklyn had been established. It was in Brooklyn that she began to rescue orphaned children from the streets of New York City, especially immigrant children. Eventually, she was asked by the Archbishop of New York, Cardinal McCloskey, to establish a home for them. Sister Mary Ann and Mother Hyacinth were looking for property in Blauveltville, when they came across a "For Sale" sign in front of the Eustace property on Western Highway. They decided to stop and look at the house and property. As they entered the parlor, they were surprised to see an original Grellet painting of the founder of their Order, Saint Dominic, raising a dead child to life—a miracle which had occurred at Saint Sixtus in Rome in the 13th century. For the two nuns, this was a sign and Sister Mary Ann exclaimed, "Here we shall be."

In 1878, she and a few other nuns established Saint Joseph Convent in Blauveltville, Rockland County, New York. Nine immigrant orphans also went with the nuns, the beginning of what is now St. Dominic's Home.

Sister Mary Ann was appointed the Religious superior of the house in 1880, and henceforth was called Mother Mary Ann. There was a great need for care for orphans, and the orphanage quickly expanded. Every available space was converted to rooms for the children and for the Sisters who cared for them. By 1884, the Sisters were caring for 389 children. Their status as cloistered nuns of the Dominican Second Order, however, continually proved to be an impediment to their service, due to various requirements in their way of life in the daily routine which complicated their service in childcare. To resolve this and other issues, in October 1890, the community separated from the motherhouse in Brooklyn and was incorporated as the Sisters of St. Dominic of Blauvelt, a religious congregation of the Third Order of St. Dominic.

== Ministry today ==
Today, more than 120 professed Sisters and associate members minister throughout New York, Rhode Island, New Jersey, Florida, California and Oregon. They are actively involved in education at all levels including colleges, high schools, grammar schools, and special education programs for the multi-handicapped. Dominican College (New York) in Orangeburg, New York was founded in 1952.

Their ministries include social service programs for the developmentally disabled, services for children in foster care (including adoption services), programs for migrant children, shelters for homeless adults and children, housing services for persons with HIV/AIDS, programs for the mentally ill and chemically addicted, and health care services for the poor. They also minister in community outreach programs that provide advocacy, ESL, literacy, and job training. They are active in social justice activities, catechetical programs; retreat work, pastoral work in parishes and hospitals, and prayer ministry.
