= New Boy (EP) =

EP by The Connells
- Released: 1994
- Recorded: 1993
- Genre: Jangle pop
- Length: 22:07
- Label: TVT
- Producer: Lou Giordano, The Connells; Tim Harper

The Connells chronology
Ring (1993)	New Boy (1994)	Weird Food and Devastation (1996)

New Boy is an EP released by the American pop rock band The Connells. Along with the title song, the EP includes the Jethro Tull cover "Living in the Past" and two tracks recorded live at Purple Dragon Studio in Atlanta, Georgia, for broadcast on Live X (WNNX).

AllMusic rated it two stars.

== Track listing ==
1. "New Boy" (Mike Connell) - 4:39
2. "Logan Street" (Connell) - 3:40
3. "Wonder Why" (Connell) - 3:14
4. "Living in the Past" (Ian Anderson) – 2:44
5. "Fun & Games" (live) (Connell, Doug MacMillan) – 3:07
6. "New Boy" (live) (Connell) – 4:43

== Personnel ==
- David Connell – bass
- Mike Connell – guitar
- George Huntley – guitar, vocals
- Doug MacMillan – vocals
- Steve Potak - keyboards
- Peele Wimberley – drums
