= Darker Days =

Darker Days may refer to:

- Darker Days (The Connells album), or the title song
- Darker Days (Time Again album), or the title song
- Darker Days (Stream of Passion album), or the title song
- Darker Days (Peter Bjorn and John album)
- Darker Days Radio (Horror Gaming Podcast)
- Darker Days (Band)
