= Weird Food and Devastation =

Studio album by the Connells
- Released: August 20, 1996
- Recorded: 1996
- Studio: Pachyderm Studio, Cannon Falls, Minnesota
- Genre: Alternative rock, indie rock
- Length: 47:50
- Label: TVT
- Producer: Tim Harper

The Connells chronology
Ring (1993)	Weird Food and Devastation (1996)	Still Life (1998)

Professional ratings
Review scores
Source	Rating
AllMusic	3/5 stars
Entertainment Weekly	B−

Weird Food and Devastation is the sixth studio album by the American pop-rock band the Connells, released on August 20, 1996. It is the highly anticipated follow up album to the successful Ring album, which was released three years prior. The album is partly mixed by longtime R.E.M.-collaborator Scott Litt. The mastering was done by engineer Bob Ludwig.

== Critical reception ==
The Washington Post wrote that "as usual, the overall effect is adept but underwhelming; Weird Food & Devastation should please the band's fans, but probably won't attract many new ones." The Houston Press called the album "dense, dark, somewhat grungy ... the strangest Connells effort to date."

== Track listing ==
1. "Maybe" (Mike Connell) - 2:30
2. "Start" (Connell) - 4:06
3. "Fifth Fret" (Doug MacMillan) - 3:40
4. "Just Like That" (MacMillan) - 3:33
5. "Adjective Song" (Connell) - 2:27
6. "Any" (Peele Wimberley) - 3:25
7. "Hang On" (Connell) - 3:20
8. "Back To Blue" (Greg Kendall, MacMillan) - 3:09
9. "Smoke" (McMillan, Potak) - 4:23
10. "Pretty Rough" (Connell) - 3:52
11. "Let It Go" (Huntley) - 3:55
12. "Friendly Time" (MacMillan) - 2:42
13. "Too High" (MacMillan) - 3:13
14. "On Your Honor" (Huntley, MacMillan) - 3:33

== Personnel ==
The Connells

- Doug MacMillan - lead vocals
- Mike Connell - guitar, vocals, lead vocals on "Friendly Time"
- George Huntley - guitar, vocals, lead vocals on "Let it Go"
- Steve Potak - piano, organ, keyboards
- David Connell - bass
- Peele Wimberley - drums, percussion

Technical personnel

- Tim Harper - producer, mixing, engineer
- Scott Litt - mixing
- Richard Dodd - mixing
- Dan Leffler - mixing assistant
- James Bauer - mixing assistant
- Mark Williams - engineer
- Robert Clark - second engineer
- Tracy Schroeder - second engineer
- Brent Lambert - editing
- Bob Ludwig - mastering
- Greg Knoll - design
- Axl Jansen - photography
