= Ring (The Connells album) =

Studio album by the Connells
- Released: September 21, 1993
- Recorded: March 1993
- Studio: Bearsville (Woodstock, New York)
- Genre: Alternative rock; jangle pop; power pop
- Length: 50:15
- Label: TVT
- Producer: Lou Giordano; the Connells; Tim Harper

The Connells chronology
One Simple Word (1990)	Ring (1993)	New Boy EP (1994)

Singles from Ring
- 1. "Slackjawed" Released: 1993 (EU); 2. "'74-'75" Released: 1993; 3. "New Boy" Released: 1994; 4. "Doin' You" Released: 1995 (EU)

Professional ratings
Review scores
Source	Rating
AllMusic	4/5 stars
Chicago Tribune	3/4 stars
NME	5/10

Ring is the fifth studio album by the American alternative rock band the Connells, released in 1993.

The album (and band)'s biggest hit was the single "'74–'75", which reached the top ten in 11 European countries, peaking at No. 1 in Norway and Sweden, and appeared on the soundtrack of the 1995 film Heavy. In the UK, the album reached number 36 on the UK Albums Chart while "'74-'75" peaked at number 14 on the UK Singles Chart. In the US, the album reached number 199 on the Billboard 200 with the single "Slackjawed" reaching number nine on Billboard's Alternative Songs chart.

On August 11, 2023, to commemorate the album's 30th anniversary, the album was remastered by Brent Lambert and released on vinyl for the first time, as well as an expanded, two-disc version on CD and in digital format, including rare B-sides and 12 previously unreleased demo tracks.

== Critical reception ==
Trouser Press wrote: "The record contains some brilliant pieces of pop songcraft ('Carry My Picture,' 'Eyes on the Ground') and some bittersweet lyrical ruminations, but slower numbers like '’74-’75' are so sweet they border on cloying."

== Track listing ==
All tracks are written by Mike Connell, except where noted.

No.	Title	Writer(s)	Length
1.	"Slackjawed"		4:00
2.	"Carry My Picture"		3:57
3.	"'74–'75"		4:38
4.	"Doin' You"	George Huntley	3:33
5.	"Find Out"	Doug MacMillan	3:31
6.	"Eyes On The Ground"	MacMillan	3:03
7.	"Spiral"		3:07
8.	"Hey You"	David Connell, M. Connell, MacMillan	3:23
9.	"New Boy"		4:39
10.	"Disappointed"		5:04
11.	"Burden"		3:59
12.	"Any Day Now"	MacMillan	2:39
13.	"Running Mary"		4:40

1994 European bonus tracks
No.	Title	Writer(s)	Length
14.	"Logan Street"		3:39
15.	"Wonder Why"		3:14
16.	"Living in the Past"	Ian Anderson	2:43

30th Anniversary CD1 bonus tracks
No.	Title	Writer(s)	Length
14.	"'74-'75 (Radio Edit)"		3:52
15.	"Slackjawed (Radio Edit)"		3:31
16.	"Logan Street"		3:39
17.	"Wonder Why"		3:13
18.	"Living in the Past"	Anderson	2:43

30th Anniversary CD2
No.	Title	Writer(s)	Length
1.	"'74-'75 (Demo)"
2.	"Carry My Picture (Demo)"
3.	"Disappointed (Demo)"
4.	"Doin' You (Demo)"	Huntley
5.	"Eyes On The Ground (Demo)"	MacMillan
6.	"Hey You (Demo)"	D. Connell, M. Connell, MacMillan
7.	"Logan Street (Demo)"
8.	"New Boy (Demo)"
9.	"Running Mary (Demo)"
10.	"Slackjawed (Demo)"
11.	"Spiral (Demo)"
12.	"Wonder Why (Demo)"
13.	"New Boy (Live Acoustic Version)"
14.	"Doin' You (Live Acoustic Version)"	Huntley
15.	"Running Mary (Live Acoustic Version)"
16.	"'74-'75 (Live Acoustic Version)"

== Personnel ==
The Connells

- Doug MacMillan - lead vocals, guitar
- Mike Connell - guitar, vocals, lead vocals on "Spiral" and "Burden"
- George Huntley - guitar, mandolin, vocals, lead vocals on "Doin' You"
- Steve Potak - piano, keyboards, organ
- David Connell - bass
- Peele Wimberley - drums, percussion

Additional personnel

- Tim Harper - keyboards, background vocals
- Caro Giordano - cello

Technical personnel

- Lou Giordano - producer, mixing, engineer
- Tom Bender - engineer
- Kate Broudy - engineer
- Dave Cook - engineer
- Dan McLoughlin - engineer
- John Yates - engineer

== Charts ==
=== Weekly charts ===
Weekly chart performance for Ring
Chart (1993–1995)	Peak position
Austrian Albums (Ö3 Austria)	10
Dutch Albums (Album Top 100)	25
Finnish Albums (Suomen virallinen lista)	40
German Albums (Offizielle Top 100)	16
Italian Albums (FIMI)	25
Norwegian Albums (VG-lista)	11
Scottish Albums (OCC)	50
Swedish Albums (Sverigetopplistan)	16
Swiss Albums (Schweizer Hitparade)	21
UK Albums (OCC)	36
US Billboard 200	199

=== Year-end charts ===
Year-end chart performance for Ring
Chart (1995)	Position
German Albums (Offizielle Top 100)	44
