= Old School Dropouts =

Studio album by The Connells
- Released: October 23, 2001
- Recorded: 1999–2001
- Studio: Steve Potak's home studio, Raleigh, NC
- Genre: Alternative rock, power pop, indie rock, jangle pop
- Length: 45:20
- Label: Black Park Records
- Producer: The Connells

The Connells chronology
Still Life (1998)	Old School Dropouts (2001)	Steadman's Wake (2021)

Professional ratings
Review scores
Source	Rating
Allmusic	3/5 stars

Old School Dropouts is the eighth studio album by the American pop/rock band The Connells, released in October 2001. It was produced and released by the band themselves on their Black Park Records label after parting ways with TVT. It was the last record that the band released officially until 2021. The album was recorded in Raleigh, NC with the band recording in different ways, like using an analogue 4-track tape machine. After the departure of longtime drummer and founding member Peele Wimberley it features Jon Wurster on drums.

== Track listing ==
All songs written by Mike Connell, except where noted.

1. "Bust" - 3:06
2. "Gladiator Heart" - 4:27
3. "Back in Blighty" - 4:05
4. "Radio" - 4:05
5. "Put Down" - 3:58
6. "Airlift" (George Huntley)- 3:04
7. "All the Time in the World" (Doug MacMillan) - 3:17
8. "Rusted Fields" - 4:41
9. "Hello Walter" - 3:35
10. "Washington" - 3:48
11. "The Bottom" (MacMillan) - 2:00

== Personnel ==
The Connells

- Mike Connell - Guitar, Vocals
- Doug MacMillan - Vocals
- George Huntley - Guitar, Vocals
- David Connell - Bass
- Steve Potak - Keyboards
- Steve Ritter - Drums

Additional Players

- Jon Wurster - Drums on "Back in Blighty", "Radio", "Put Down", "Airlift", "All the Time in the World", "Hello Walter", and "Washington"
- Tim Harper - Backing Vocals on "Back in Blighty", "All the Time in the World" and Keyboards on "The Bottom"

Recording and Mixing

- All tracks recorded by Tim Harper on ADAT except tracks 1, 2, and 8 recorded by Jon Heames on 4-Track analog. Additional recording by Steve Potak on tracks 1, 3–7, and 10.
- All tracks mixed by Steve Potak and Mike Connell, except "The Bottom" mixed by Steve Potak and Doug MacMillan.
