= List of former TVT Records artists =

This is a list of artists who formerly recorded for TVT Records.
Listed in parentheses are names of affiliated labels for which the artist recorded for TVT in conjunction with.

== 0–9 ==
- 213

== A ==
- The A'z
- A Cult Called Karrianna
- Ambulance LTD
- Autechre (Wax Trax!/TVT)

== B ==
- The Baldwin Brothers
- Bender
- Bennett, Paris
- Birdbrain
- Black, Oliver
- The Blue Van
- Bobaflex
- Bounty Killer
- Brian Jonestown Massacre
- Buck-O-Nine

== C ==
- Catherine
- The Cinematics
- Closure
- Coleman, Jaz
- The Connells
- Course of Empire
- Cubanate

== D ==
- Default
- Die Warzau
- Doggy's Angels
- Dudley, Anne
- Dude 'n Nem

== E ==
- Tha Eastsidaz
- Emergency Broadcast Network

== F ==
- Full Force

== G ==
- Mic Geronimo (Blunt/TVT)
- Gravity Kills
- Guided by Voices
- GZR
- Goldie Loc (TVT/Doggystyle)

== H ==
- Hernandez, Marcos
- The Holloways
- DJ Hurricane

== I ==
- In the Nursery (Wax Trax!/TVT)

== J ==
- Ja Rule
- Jacki-O
- Jurassic 5
- Juster
- Just Jack
- Juno Reactor (Wax Trax!/TVT)

== K ==
- KMFDM (Wax Trax!/TVT)

== L ==
- Shona Laing
- Lil Jon and the Eastside Boyz
- Lumidee

== M ==
- Magic
- Modern English
- Moses, Teedra
- Mood

== N ==
- Nashville Pussy
- Naughty by Nature
- New Years Day
- Nine Inch Nails
- Nothingface

== O ==
- Oobie

== P ==
- Page, Jimmy
- Pay the Girl
- Pitbull
- The Polyphonic Spree
- Psychic TV
- Psykosonik
- Polygon Window (Wax Trax!/TVT)

== R ==
- Rise Robots Rise
- Royal Flush

== S ==
- Sister Machine Gun
- Southern Culture on the Skids
- Spookey Ruben
- The Saints
- Gil Scott-Heron
- Sevendust
- Slo Leak
- Speech
- Starchildren
- The Strays

== T ==
- Towers of London
- Tsar
- Twisted Black

== U ==
- The Unband
- Underworld

== V ==
- Vallejo
- VNV Nation
- Vision of Disorder

== W ==
- Wayne
- The Wellwater Conspiracy
- Wyatt, Keke

== X ==
- XTC

== Y ==
- Ying Yang Twins
- Yo Gotti
