= Fun & Games (The Connells album) =

1989 studio album by The Connells

Studio album by the Connells
- Released: 1989
- Recorded: 1988–89
- Studio: Fort Apache, Cambridge, MA & Studio 900, NYC
- Genre: Rock
- Length: 45:20
- Label: TVT
- Producer: Gary Smith, Anthony Battaglia, Matt Matthews, the Connells

The Connells chronology
Boylan Heights (1987)	Fun & Games (1989)	One Simple Word (1990)

Singles from Fun & Games
- 1. "Something to Say" Released: 1989

Fun & Games is the third studio album by the American band the Connells, released in 1989. It was recorded primarily at Fort Apache Studios, in Cambridge, MA, with additional recording at Studio 900 in New York City and Reflection Studio in Charlotte, NC.

The album reached No. 163 on the Billboard 200; the single "Something to Say" reached No. 7 on the Hot Modern Rock Tracks chart. The band supported the album with a North American tour.

== Critical reception ==
Professional ratings
Review scores
Source	Rating
AllMusic	2/5 stars
Chicago Tribune	3/4 stars
The Rolling Stone Album Guide	3/5 stars

The Washington Post wrote: "Though less redolent of Celtic airs than the previous platter, Fun has a similar sweep, its melodies cascading gently over the Piedmont." The Philadelphia Inquirer deemed the album "hooky, straightforward rock." The Chicago Tribune called it "a musical blend that's both bucolic and brawny and possessed of some real presence, vitality and depth."

== Track listing ==
1. "Something to Say" (Mike Connell) - 3:40
2. "Fun & Games" (Connell, Doug MacMillan) - 3:06
3. "Sal" (George Huntley, Mike Ayers, Peele Wimberley) - 3:44
4. "Upside Down" (Connell) - 3:16
5. "Fine Tuning" (Connell) - 3:19
6. "Motel" (Huntley) - 3:40
7. "Hey Wow" (Connell) - 4:17
8. "Ten Pins" (Connell, Huntley, MacMillan) - 4:06
9. "Inside My Head" (Huntley) - 3:12
10. "Uninspired" (Connell, MacMillan) - 4:10
11. "Sat Nite (USA)" (The Connells) - 3:47
12. "Lay Me Down" (Huntley) - 5:03

"Fine Tuning" was a CD only bonus track.

== Personnel ==
The Connells

- Doug MacMillan - lead vocals
- Mike Connell - guitar, slide guitar
- George Huntley - guitar, backing vocals; lead vocals on "Sal", "Motel", "Ten Pins", "Inside my Head" and "Lay me Down"
- David Connell - bass, percussion
- Peele Wimberley - drums, percussion

Additional personnel

- Willa Bassen - French horn sampler
- Deborah Coffman - cello
- Steve Haigler - bells
- Jeb Bishop - trombone
- Tom Gordon - saxophone
- Jon Thornton - trumpet
- Gary Smith - producer, piano, organ, guitar, slide guitar, vibes, backing vocals, "la la la's"
- Anthony Battaglia - producer, guitar, backing vocals
- Matt Matthews - producer
- Beth Cumber - cover illustration, design
