= Still Life (The Connells album) =

Studio album by the Connells
- Released: May 26, 1998
- Genres: Alternative rock, jangle pop
- Length: 43:42
- Label: TVT
- Producers: Jim Scott, Tim Harper

The Connells chronology
Weird Food and Devastation (1996)	Still Life (1998)	Old School Dropouts (2001)

Professional ratings
Review scores
Source	Rating
AllMusic	3/5 stars

Still Life is the seventh studio album by the American pop/rock band the Connells, released in 1998. It is the last album to include founding member Peele Wimberley on drums.

== Critical reception ==
The Washington Post wrote: "Several numbers, such as 'Curly's Train' and 'Glade', dip into Uncle Tupelo-style alternative-country, but the best numbers, such as 'Circlin' ' and the title track, boast the jaded, ironic take on the Byrds and Beatles that defined Southeastern indie-rock in the '80s." Salon called the album "engaging, unmistakably Southern guitar-rock with smart, darkish lyrics and an irreproachable melodic sense." Stereo Review thought that "with an abundance of talent and the wherewithal to refine it into polished pop, the Connells craft a fetching piece of sonic artwork in Still Life."

== Track listing ==
All songs written by Mike Connell, except where noted.

1. "Dull, Brown And Gray" - 3:11
2. "The Leper" - 3:06
3. "Bruised" (Peele Wimberley) - 3:05
4. "Curly's Train" (George Huntley) - 3:46
5. "Gauntlet" (Doug MacMillan) - 3:31
6. "Glade" (Steve Potak) - 3:30
7. "Soul Reactor" - 3:09
8. "Still Life" - 3:09
9. "Crown" - 3:57
10. "Circlin'" (MacMillan) - 2:44
11. "Gonna Take A Lie" (Peele Wimberley) - 3:37
12. "Queens Of Charades" (Huntley) - 3:32
13. "Pedro Says" (David Connell) - 3:25

== Personnel ==
The Connells

- Doug MacMillan - lead vocals
- Mike Connell - guitar, vocals
- George Huntley - guitar, piano, vocals, lead vocals on "Curly's Train" and "Queen of Charades"
- Steve Potak - keyboards
- David Connell - bass
- Peele Wimberley - drums, percussion

Additional personnel

- Linda Vogel - background vocals
- Jim Scott - background vocals

Technical personnel

- Jim Scott - producer, mixing, engineer
- Tim Harper - producer, arranger, production engineer
- Greg Fidelman - engineer
- Billy Joe Bowers - engineer
- Mike Scotella - engineer
- Bill Mooney - design
- Axl Jansen - photography
