= Boylan Heights (album) =

Studio album by the Connells
- Released: 1987
- Recorded: 1986–87
- Studio: Drive-In Studio, Winston-Salem, North Carolina
- Genre: Alternative rock, jangle pop
- Length: 39:19
- Label: TVT
- Producer: Mitch Easter

The Connells chronology
Darker Days (1985)	Boylan Heights (1987)	Fun & Games (1989)

Professional ratings
Review scores
Source	Rating
AllMusic	4.5/5 stars
Chicago Tribune	2.5/4 stars
The Encyclopedia of Popular Music	3/5 stars
MusicHound Rock: The Essential Album Guide	4.5/5 stars
The Rolling Stone Album Guide	3.5/5 stars

Boylan Heights is the second album by the American pop/rock band the Connells. It was released in 1987, and was their first for TVT Records. The title of the album references the historic Boylan Heights neighborhood of Raleigh, North Carolina.

== Production ==
The album was recorded at Drive-In Studio, and was produced by Mitch Easter.

== Critical reception ==
AllMusic praised the album as an improvement on the previous effort, noting the influences of Southern rock and Celtic rock. Trouser Press wrote that "the band has matured into a distinctive enough unit to do justice to Michael’s yearning collegiate considerations of love, war and alienation." MusicHound Rock: The Essential Album Guide deemed Boylan Heights "one of the most distinctive college rock albums of the '80s." The Orlando Sentinel called it "a collection of warmly energetic and melodic rockers."

== Track listing ==
All songs by Mike Connell, except "Home Today" by George Huntley.

1. "Scotty's Lament" - 3:24
2. "Choose A Side" - 3:44
3. "Try" - 3:17
4. "Just Like Us"- 3:28
5. "If It Crumbles" - 3:43
6. "Pawns" - 3:24
7. "Over There" - 3:29
8. "Elegance" - 3:40
9. "Home Today" - 3:28
10. "OT² (Instrumental)" - 2:52
11. "I Suppose" - 4:50

== Personnel ==
The Connells

- Doug MacMillan - lead vocals
- Mike Connell - guitar, backing vocals
- George Huntley - guitar, backing vocals, keyboards; lead vocals on "Home Today"
- David Connell - bass
- Peele Wimberley - drums

Additional personnel

- Mitch Easter - producer
- Bill Spencer - trumpet
- Angie Carlson - Hammond organ
- Molly Leach - design
- Lane Smith - illustration
- Steve Wilson - photography
