= Television's Greatest Hits: 65 TV Themes! From the 50's and 60's =

Television's Greatest Hits: 65 TV Themes! From the '50s and '60s

Compilation album by Various
- Released: 1985
- Label: TVT Records

Various chronology
Television's Greatest Hits: 65 TV Themes! From the '50s and '60s (1985)	Television's Greatest Hits, Volume 2: 65 More TV Themes from the '50s & '60s (1986)

Professional ratings
Review scores
Source	Rating
Allmusic	4.5/5 stars

Television's Greatest Hits: 65 TV Themes! From the '50s and '60s is a compilation album of television theme songs released by Tee-Vee Toons in 1985 as the first volume of the Television's Greatest Hits series. It was initially released as a double LP record featuring 65 themes from television shows ranging from the 1950s until the late 1960s.

The album catalog was later acquired by Bicycle Music Company. In September 2011, Los Angeles-based Oglio Records announced they were releasing the Television's Greatest Hits song catalog after entering into an arrangement Bicycle. A series of 9 initial "6-packs" including some of the songs from the album has been announced for 2011.

== Releases ==
The album's content varied from the original 1985 LP and cassette releases to the later CD re-release. Don Pardo "hosted" the original LP and cassette versions with spoken segments at the start of the album and at the end of each side, resulting in five tracks exclusive to the analog formats:

- The first track on the first record/tape, side one, begins with a musical sample of Edvard Grieg's "Morning Mood" from the Peer Gynt suite, which is interrupted by Don Pardo beginning the "broadcast day."
- Side one concludes with a faux test announcement of the Emergency Broadcast System, leading into the "Duck and Cover" song (from the 1951 Civil Defense education film of the same name.)
- Side two concludes with easy-listening music and Pardo making announcements of the "station" having technical difficulties and to please stand by. This was also sampled on Hexstatic's album Rewind.
- Side three (the first side on the second record/tape) concludes with a medley of news themes and announcer voices, led off by Pardo announcing a faux news bulletin interrupting the "broadcast" over a music sample of Beethoven's 9th Symphony, specifically the "Scherzo" movement.
- Side four (and the whole album) concludes with Don Pardo signing-off the "broadcast day" with a recording of the United States national anthem (enhanced with explosion and firework sounds near the end), and then fades on a test pattern tone (signaling the "station" has gone off the air.)

== Track listing ==
NOTE: An asterisk (*) designates a track that was re-recorded for either a later season of the TV show, a single/album by the theme song artist or this album. A double asterisk (**) denotes a track exclusive to the record and cassette versions only, and, except for the Japanese release on CBS/Sony, do not show up on any CD version.

Side A (LP and Cassette versions)

1. Peer Gynt: Morning Suite**
  Talking Voices (performed by): Don Pardo
  Music Composed by Edvard Grieg
2. Captain Kangaroo ("Puffin' Billy")*
  Music Composed by Edward White
3. The Little Rascals ("Good Old Days")
  Music Composed by Roy Shields
  First appeared in the 1930 Our Gang/Little Rascals short "Teacher's Pet"
4. The Flintstones ("Meet the Flintstones")
  Background Vocals sung by The Skip-Jacks
  (Music & Lyrics) Written by Hoyt Curtin, William Hanna & Joseph Barbera
5. The Woody Woodpecker Show
  Music Composed by George Tibbles & Ramey Idriss
6. The Bugs Bunny Show ("The Bugs Bunny Overture (This Is It!)") Written by Jerry Livingston & Mack David
7. Casper the Friendly Ghost - Written by Jerry Livingston & M. David
8. Felix the Cat - Written by Winston Sharples
  Vocals performed by Ann Bennett
9. Popeye - Written by Sammy Lerner
  Music Arranged by Winston Sharples
10. Yogi Bear - Written by H. Curtin, W. Hanna & J. Barbera
11. Magilla Gorilla - Written by H. Curtin, W. Hanna & J. Barbera
12. Top Cat
  Written by H. Curtin, W. Hanna, J. Barbera & Evelyn Timmens
13. The Jetsons ("Meet George Jetson")
  Written by H. Curtin, W. Hanna & J. Barbera
14. Fireball XL5 - Music Composed by Barry Gray
  Lyrics Written by Charles Blackwell
  Vocals sung by Don Spencer
15. Howdy Doody
  Lyrics Written by Buffalo Bob Smith & Edward Kean
  Talking Voices: Buffalo Bob Smith
  Background Vocals: "A Choir of 40-Children"
  Music based on the vaudeville song "Ta-ra-ra Boom-de-ay", originally credited as composed by Henry J. Sayers
16. Test of the Emergency Broadcast System - Duck and Cover**
  EBS Voice: Don Pardo
  "Duck and Cover" Songwriting Credited to Civil Defense Department

Side B

1. The Beverly Hillbillies ("The Ballad of Jed Clampett")*
  Performed by Flatt & Scruggs featuring Jerry Scoggins
  Written by Paul Henning
2. Petticoat Junction* - Written by P. Henning & Curt Massey
  Vocals sung by Curt Massey
3. Green Acres - Vocals Performed by Eddie Albert & Eva Gabor
  Written by Vic Mizzy
4. Mister Ed - Vocals Performed by Jay Livingston
  Music Composed by Jay Livingston
  Lyrics Written by Ray Evans
5. The Munsters* - Music Composed by Jack Marshall
6. The Addams Family - Written & Arranged by Vic Mizzy
  Background Vocals: Vic Mizzy
  Finger Snaps & Additional Voices: Ted Cassidy
7. My Three Sons* - Music Composed by Frank De Vol
8. The Donna Reed Show ("Happy Days")* -
  Music Composed by John Seely
9. Leave It to Beaver ("The Toy Parade")* -
  Music Composed by Dave Kahn, Melvyn Leonard & Mort Greene
10. Dennis the Menace* -
  Music Composed by John Seely & William Loose
11. The Many Loves of Dobie Gillis* -
  Music Composed by Lionel Newman
  Lyrics Written by Max Shulman
  Vocals performed by Judd Conlon's Rhythmaires
12. The Patty Duke Show ("Cousins")
  Written by Robert Wells, Sid Ramin & Harry Geller
  Vocals performed by The Skip-Jacks
13. The Dick Van Dyke Show* - Music Composed by Earle Hagen
14. Gilligan's Island ("The Ballad of Gilligan's Isle")* -
  Written by George Wyle & Sherwood Schwartz
15. McHale's Navy* - Music Composed by Axel Stordahl
16. I Dream of Jeannie ("Jeannie")* -
  Music Composed by Hugo Montenegro & Buddy Kaye
17. I Love Lucy* - Music Composed by Eliot Daniel & Harold Adamson
18. The Andy Griffith Show ("The Fishin' Hole")*
  Performed by Earle Hagen
  Music Composed by E. Hagen & Herbert W. Spencer
19. Please Stand By** - Voices: Don Pardo

Side C

1. Star Trek ("Theme from Star Trek")* - Written by Alexander Courage
  Monologue Voice narrated by William Shatner
  Soprano Vocals sung by Loulie Jean Norman
2. Lost in Space ("Lost in Space Main Title: Season 3")* - Music Composed by Johnny T. Williams
3. The Twilight Zone* - Music Composed by Marius Constant
4. Alfred Hitchcock Presents ("Funeral March of a Marionette")*
  Music Composed by Charles Gounod
5. Superman ("Superman March")
  Written & Arranged by Leon Klatzkin
  Narrator Voiced by Bill Kennedy
6. Batman ("Batman Theme")* - Written by Neal Hefti
  Contains replayed elements from "To the Batmobile", as performed by Nelson Riddle with Adam West & Burt Ward, with Dialog written by Lorenzo Semple Jr.
7. Flipper* - Music Composed by Henry Vars
  Lyrics Written by William "By" Dunham
8. Combat! - Music Composed by Leonard Rosenman
9. The Rifleman* - Music Composed by Herschel Burke Gilbert
10. Bonanza* - Performed by Al Caiola
  Music Composed by Jay Livingston & Ray Evans
11. Branded - Written by Dominic Frontiere & Alan Alch
12. F Troop - Written by William Lava & Irving Taylor
13. Rin Tin Tin - Music Composed by Stanley Keyana
14. Daniel Boone* - Music Composed by Lionel Newman
  Lyrics Written by Ken Darby
  Lyrics Credited to Vera Matson
15. The Wild Wild West* - Music Composed by Richard Markowitz
16. The Lone Ranger (Music taken from "William Tell Overture")
  Music Composed by Gioachino Rossini
  Music Arranged by Ben Bonnell
  Orchestra conducted by Daniel Perez Castaneda
  Narrator Voices: Gerald Mohr & Fred Foy
  Sampled Voice ("Hi-Yo Silver"): Earle W. Graser
17. The Roy Rogers Show ("Happy Trails")
  Written by Dale Evans & Foy Willing
18. We Interrupt This Program - News Medley**
  Additional Voices: Don Pardo
  Featuring Music Composed by Ludwig van Beethoven

Side D

1. Mission: Impossible* - Music Composed by Lalo Schifrin
2. The Man from U.N.C.L.E. - Music Composed by Jerry Goldsmith
3. Get Smart* - Music Composed by Irving Szathmary
4. Secret Agent ("Secret Agent Man")* - Performed by Johnny Rivers
  Written by P. F. Sloan & Steve Barri
5. Dragnet ("Theme and March")* - Performed by Ray Anthony
  Written by Walter Schumann
  Music based on the "Main Title", from the 1946 film "The Killers", composed & performed by Miklós Rózsa
6. Perry Mason ("Park Avenue Beat")* -
  Music composed by Fred Steiner
7. Adam-12 - Written by Frank Comstock
8. The F.B.I. - Music Composed by Bronisław Kaper
9. Hawaii Five-O ("Hawaii Five-O Theme")* - Performed by The Ventures
  Music Composed by Morton Stevens
10. 77 Sunset Strip* - Written by Jerry Livingston & Mack David
11. Surfside 6 - Written by Jerry Livingston & M. David
12. Ironside* - Music Composed by Quincy Jones
13. Mannix* - Music Composed by L. Schifrin
14. The Mod Squad - Music Composed by Earle Hagen
15. The Tonight Show ("Johnny's Theme")* -
  Music Composed by Johnny Carson & Paul Anka
16. The Late Show ("The Syncopated Clock")* -
  Music Composed by Leroy Anderson
17. WTV Toons Sign-Off - The Star-Spangled Banner** -
  Voices: Don Pardo
  Music Composed by Francis Scott Key

== Reception ==
Alongside Television's Greatest Hits Volume II, the compilation was described by CD Review as "organized as a theoretical average viewing day". CD Review jokingly commented that the compilation would be "highly effective during interrogations" by the FBI.
