= Darker Days (The Connells album) =

Studio album by The Connells
- Released: 1985
- Genre: Jangle pop
- Length: 27:07
- Label: Black Park
- Producer: Don Dixon, Dave Adams, Steve Gronback, Rod Dash

The Connells chronology
| Hats Off (1985) | Darker Days (1985) | Boylan Heights (1987) |

Alternative cover
- This art was used for the cover of the Demon Records (UK) release.

Professional ratings
Review scores
| Source | Rating |
|---|---|
| AllMusic | 3/5 stars |

Darker Days is the debut album by the American pop/rock band The Connells, initially released in 1985 on independent label Black Park Records in the United States, and on Demon Records in the UK. The Black Park and Demon versions are distinct, with different cover art and running order, the substitution of "In My Head" for "Dial It", and several remixed tracks. The Black Park version of the album was re-released in 1987 on TVT Records.

== US track listing ==
All songs written by Mike Connell except "1934" by George Huntley

1. "Hats Off" – 4:03
2. "Holding Pattern" – 3:20
3. "Seven" – 3:12
4. "Unspoken Words" – 3:21
5. "Darker Days (version)" – 3:12
6. "Much Easier" – 3:49
7. "1934" – 2:12
8. "Brighter Worlds" – 2:21
9. "Dial It" – 1:37

== UK track listing ==
1. "Darker Days" – 3:12
2. "Much Easier" – 3:49
3. "1934" – 2:12
4. "Brighter Worlds" – 2:21
5. "In My Head" – 2:51
6. "Hats Off" – 4:03
7. "Holding Pattern" – 3:20
8. "Seven" – 3:12
9. "Unspoken Words" – 3:21

== Personnel ==
The Connells

- Doug MacMillan – vocals
- Mike Connell – guitar
- David Connell – bass
- Peele Wimberley – drums
- George Huntley – guitar, keyboards, vocals

Additional personnel

- Don Dixon – producer
- Dave Adams – producer
- Steve Gronback – producer
- Rod Dash – producer
- John Rosenthal – photography
- Paul Dean – design, photography
- Beth Cumber – design
