= Television's Greatest Hits: Black and White Classics =

Television's Greatest Hits, Volume 4: Black & White Classics

Compilation album
- Released: 1996
- Label: TVT Records

chronology
TeeVee Toons: The Commercials (1989)	Television's Greatest Hits, Volume 4: Black & White Classics (1996)	Television's Greatest Hits, Volume 5: In Living Color (1996)

Television's Greatest Hits: Black & White Classics, prefaced with "TeeVee Toons Presents", is a 1996 compilation album of television theme songs from the 1950s and 1960s released by TVT Records as the fourth volume of the Television's Greatest Hits series.

The album catalog was later acquired by The Bicycle Music Company. In September 2011, Los Angeles–based Oglio Records announced they were releasing the Television's Greatest Hits song catalog after entering into an arrangement The Bicycle Music Company. A series of 9 initial "6-packs" including some of the songs from the album has been announced for 2011.

== Track listing ==
1. A1 Astro Boy
2. A2 Roger Ramjet
3. A3 The Mighty Hercules
4. A4 The Gumby Show
5. A5 Beany and Cecil
6. A6 Tennessee Tuxedo and His Tales
7. A7 Quick Draw McGraw
8. A8 Wally Gator
9. A9 King Leonardo and His Short Subjects
10. A10 The Big World of Little Adam
11. A11 Kukla, Fran and Ollie ("Here We Are, Hop, Hop, Hop")
12. A12 Soupy Sales
13. A13 Captain Midnight
14. B1 Make Room For Daddy ("Danny Boy" (AKA "Londonderry Air"))
15. B2 Father Knows Best
16. B3 My Little Margie
17. B4 The Adventures of Ozzie and Harriet
18. B5 Hazel
19. B6 Our Miss Brooks ("Whistling Bells")
20. B7 Karen
21. B8 The Real McCoys
22. B9 Lassie
23. B10 Walt Disney's Wonderful World of Color
24. B11 Davy Crockett, King of the Wild Frontier ("The Ballad of Davy Crockett")
25. C1 The Life and Legend of Wyatt Earp
26. C2 Gunsmoke ("The Old Trail")
27. C3 Lawman
28. C4 26 Men
29. C5 Colt .45
30. C6 Cheyenne
31. C7 Bronco
32. C8 The Legend of Jesse James
33. C9 Hopalong Cassidy ("Hopalong Cassidy March")
34. C10 The Everglades
35. C11 Adventures In Paradise
36. C12 Victory At Sea ("Song of the High Seas")
37. C13 Dr. Kildare ("Three Stars Will Shine Tonight")
38. C14 Medic
39. D1 Burke's Law
40. D2 Highway Patrol
41. D3 M Squad
42. D4 The Detectives Starring Robert Taylor
43. D5 The Untouchables
44. D6 The Fugitive
45. D7 Checkmate
46. D8 Tightrope
47. D9 Mr. Lucky
48. D10 Bourbon Street Beat
49. D11 Pete Kelly's Blues
50. D12 Asphalt Jungle
51. D13 Mr. Broadway ("Blues For Mr. Broadway")
52. D14 Johnny Staccato
53. D15 Naked City ("Somewhere In the Night")
54. D16 The Twenty-First Century
55. D17 The French Chef
56. D18 Candid Camera
57. D19 You Bet Your Life ("Hooray For Captain Spaulding")
58. D20 Amos 'n' Andy ("Angel's Serenade")
59. D21 The Abbott and Costello Show
60. D22 Laurel and Hardy Laughtoons ("Kooky Koo-Koo")
61. D23 The Lawrence Welk Show ("Bubbles In the Wine")
62. D24 Ted Mack's Original Amateur Hour
63. D25 Miss America Pageant ("There She Is, Miss America")
64. D26 The Red Skelton Show ("Holiday For Strings")
65. D27 The Bob Hope Show ("Thanks For the Memory")
