= Television's Greatest Hits: Remote Control =

Television's Greatest Hits, Volume 6: Remote Control

Compilation album
- Released: 1996
- Label: TVT Records

chronology
Television's Greatest Hits, Volume 5: In Living Color (1996)	Television's Greatest Hits, Volume 6: Remote Control (1996)	Television's Greatest Hits, Volume 7: Cable Ready (1996)

Television's Greatest Hits: Remote Control, prefaced with "TeeVee Toons Presents", is a 1996 compilation album of 65 television theme songs from the 1970s and 1980s released by TVT Records as the sixth volume of the Television's Greatest Hits series.

The album catalog was later acquired by The Bicycle Music Company. In September 2011, Los Angeles–based Oglio Records announced they were releasing the Television's Greatest Hits song catalog after entering into an arrangement with The Bicycle Music Company. A series of 9 initial "6-packs" including some of the songs from the album has been announced for 2011.

== Track listing ==
1. A1 Fish
2. A2 Night Court
3. A3 What's Happening!!
4. A4 Diff'rent Strokes ("It Takes Diff'rent Strokes")
5. A5 Mr. Belvedere ("According To Our New Arrivals")
6. A6 Growing Pains ("As Long As We Got Each Other")
7. A7 Charles in Charge
8. A8 Silver Spoons ("Together")
9. A9 Webster ("Then Came You")
10. A10 Too Close For Comfort
11. A11 Who's the Boss? ("Brand New Life")
12. A12 Perfect Strangers ("Nothing's Gonna Stop Me Now")
13. A13 Alice ("There's a New Girl In Town")
14. A14 It's a Living
15. A15 Angie
16. A16 227 ("There's No Place Like Home")
17. A17 The Golden Girls ("Thank You For Being a Friend")
18. B1 ALF
19. B2 Mork & Mindy
20. B3 Police Squad!
21. B4 Family Ties ("Without Us")
22. B5 Moonlighting
23. B6 Soap
24. B7 Benson
25. B8 The Benny Hill Show ("Yakety Sax")
26. B9 The Young Ones
27. B10 The People's Court ("The Big One")
28. B11 Family Feud ("The Feud")
29. B12 The Price Is Right
30. B13 Siskel and Ebert
31. B14 Monday Night Football ("Superstar" (AKA "Heavy Action"))
32. B15 Lifestyles of the Rich and Famous ("Come With Me Now")
33. B16 Fame
34. B17 The Paper Chase
35. B18 Fantasy Island
36. C1 Falcon Crest
37. C2 The Colbys
38. C3 Highway to Heaven
39. C4 The Dukes of Hazzard ("Good Ol' Boys")
40. C5 B. J. and the Bear
41. C6 Movin' On
42. C7 The Fall Guy ("The Unknown Stuntman")
43. C8 James at 15 ("It's All Up To You")
44. C9 Eight Is Enough
45. C10 Baa Baa Black Sheep
46. C11 Trapper John, M.D.
47. C12 CHiPs
48. C13 Vega$
49. C14 Matt Houston
50. D1 Cagney & Lacey
51. D2 T. J. Hooker
52. D3 Hardcastle and McCormick ("Drive")
53. D4 Hunter
54. D5 MacGyver
55. D6 Knight Rider
56. D7 Airwolf
57. D8 The Incredible Hulk
58. D9 V: The Series
59. D10 The Twilight Zone (1985–1989)
60. D11 Doctor Who
61. D12 Mystery!
62. D13 The Hardy Boys/Nancy Drew Mysteries
63. D14 Roots
64. D15 Vietnam: A Television History
65. D16 Cosmos: A Personal Voyage ("Heaven and Hell")
