= Hats Off (EP) =

Hats Off EP

EP by The Connells
- Released: 1985
- Genre: Jangle pop
- Length: 10:46
- Label: Black Park

The Connells chronology
| Hats Off EP (1985) | Darker Days (1985) |

Hats Off EP was The Connells' first release, preceding Darker Days. It includes early versions of "If It Crumbles", which also appears on Boylan Heights, and "Hats Off" which would later be re-recorded for the band's debut album Darker Days.

== Track listing ==
Side one

1. "Hats Off (Ten Gallon Remix)" – 4:04

Side two

1. "Darker Days" – 3:10
2. "If It Crumbles" – 3:32

== Personnel ==
- Mike Connell – Guitar
- David Connell – Bass
- George Huntley – Guitar, Keyboards, Vocals
- Doug MacMillan – Vocals
- Peele Wimberley – Drums
