= Television's Greatest Hits, Volume II: 65 More TV Themes From the 50's and 60's =

Television's Greatest Hits, Volume 2: 65 More TV Themes from the '50s & '60s

Compilation album
- Released: 1986
- Length: 72:30
- Label: TVT Records

chronology
Television's Greatest Hits: 65 TV Themes! From the '50s and '60s (1985)	Television's Greatest Hits, Volume 2: 65 More TV Themes from the '50s & '60s (1986)	Television's Greatest Hits, Volume 3: '70s & '80s (1987)

Professional ratings
Review scores
Source	Rating
Allmusic	4.5/5 stars

Television's Greatest Hits, Volume II: 65 More TV Themes from the '50s & '60s is a 1986 compilation album of television theme songs from the 1950s and 1960s released by TVT Records as the second volume of the Television's Greatest Hits series.

The album catalog was later acquired by The Bicycle Music Company. In September 2011, Los Angeles-based Oglio Records announced they were releasing the Television's Greatest Hits song catalog after entering into an arrangement The Bicycle Music Company. A series of 9 initial "6-packs" including some of the songs from the album has been announced for 2011.

== Track listing ==
NOTE: An asterisk (*) donates a track that was re-recorded for the album.

1. The Three Stooges ("Three Blind Mice")*
  Composed by Thomas Ravenscroft, arranged by Spud Murphy
2. Merrie Melodies ("Merrily We Roll Along")*
  Composed by Eddie Cantor, Charles Tobias and Murray Mencher
3. The Rocky and Bullwinkle Show
  Composed by Frank Comstock
4. Huckleberry Hound
  Composed by Hoyt Curtin, William Hanna & Joseph Barbera
5. Mighty Mouse Playhouse ("Mighty Mouse Theme (Here I Come to Save the Day)")
  Composed by Marshall Barer and Phillip Scheib
  Performed by The Sandpipers
6. Courageous Cat and Minute Mouse*
  Composed by Johnny Holiday
7. The Pink Panther Show ("The Pink Panther Theme")*
  Composed by Henry Mancini
8. The Road Runner Show*
  Composed and performed by Barbara Cameron
9. George of the Jungle
  Composed by Stan Worth and Sheldon Allman
10. Jonny Quest
  Composed by Hoyt Curtin, William Hanna & Joseph Barbera
11. Spider-Man
  Composed by Bob Harris and Paul Francis Webster
12. Underdog*
  Composed by W. Watts Biggers, Chet Stover, Joe Harris and Treadwell Covington
13. Looney Tunes ("The Merry-Go-Round Broke Down")*
  Composed by Cliff Friend and Dave Franklin
14. Peanuts ("Linus and Lucy")*
  Composed by Vince Guaraldi
  Performed by Vince Guaraldi Trio
15. Mister Rogers' Neighborhood ("Won't You Be My Neighbor?")
  Composed and performed by Fred Rogers
16. The Odd Couple
  Composed by Neal Hefti
17. The Courtship of Eddie's Father ("Best Friend")
  Composed and performed by Harry Nilsson
18. The Mary Tyler Moore Show ("Love is All Around")
  Composed by Sonny Curtis
19. Gidget ("(Wait 'Til You See) My Gidget")
  Composed by Jack Keller and Howard Greenfield
  Performed by Johnny Tillotson
20. That Girl
  Composed by Sam Denoff and Earle Hagen
21. Bewitched*
  Composed by Jack Keller and Howard Greenfield
22. Love, American Style
  Composed by Charles Fox and Arnold Margolin
  Performed by The Cowsills
23. The Honeymooners ("You're My Greatest Love")
  Composed by Jackie Gleason and Bill Templeton
24. I Married Joan*
  Composed by Richard Mack
25. The Monkees ("(Theme from) The Monkees")
  Composed by Tommy Boyce and Bobby Hart
  Performed by The Monkees
26. The Brady Bunch
  Composed by Frank De Vol and Sherwood Schwartz
  Performed by The Brady Bunch
27. The Partridge Family ("C'mon, Get Happy")
  Composed by Diane Hilderbrand, Danny Janssen and Wes Farrell
  Performed by The Partridge Family
28. My Mother the Car*
  Composed by Ralph Carmichael and Paul Hampton
29. Car 54, Where Are You?
  Composed by Nat Hiken and John Strauss
30. It's About Time*
  Composed by Sherwood Schwartz, George Wyle and Gerald Fried
31. My Favorite Martian
  Composed by George Greeley
32. Jeopardy! ("Think!")
  Composed by Merv Griffin
33. Hogan's Heroes
  Composed by Jerry Fielding
34. Gomer Pyle, U.S.M.C.
  Composed by Earle Hagen
35. The Rat Patrol
  Composed by Dominic Frontiere
36. 12 O'Clock High
  Composed by Dominic Frontiere
37. The Time Tunnel
  Composed by John Williams
38. Voyage To the Bottom of the Sea ("The Seaview Theme")
  Composed by Paul Sawtell
39. Sea Hunt ("The Sea Hunt Theme")*
  Composed by David Rose (as "Ray Llewellyn")
40. Daktari*
  Composed by Shelly Manne and Henry Vars
41. Tarzan
  Composed by Sydney Lee and Walter Greene
42. The Adventures of Robin Hood ("The Adventures of Robin Hood (Closing Theme)")
  Composed by Carl Sigman
  Performed by Dick James
43. Rawhide
  Composed by Dimitri Tiomkin and Ned Washington
  Performed by Frankie Laine
44. Bat Masterson*
  Composed by David Rose (as "Havens Wray") and Bart Corwin
45. Maverick*
  Composed by David Buttolph and Paul Francis Webster
46. Wagon Train
  Composed by Henri René and Bob Russell
47. Have Gun – Will Travel ("The Ballad of Paladin")*
  Composed by Johnny Western, Richard Boone and Sam Rolfe
  Performed by Duane Eddy
48. The Virginian*
  Composed by Percy Faith
49. The Rebel ("The Rebel (The Ballad of Johnny Yuma)")
  Composed by Richard Markowitz and Andrew J. Fenady
50. Peter Gunn*
  Composed by Henry Mancini
51. Route 66 ("Route 66 Theme")*
  Composed by Nelson Riddle
52. I Spy
  Composed by Earle Hagen
53. The Avengers*
  Composed by John Dankworth
54. The Saint*
  Composed by Edwin Astley
55. Hawaiian Eye ("The Hawaiian Eye Theme")*
  Composed by Jerry Livingston and Mack David
  Performed by Warren Barker
56. The Green Hornet ("Flight of the Bumblebee")
  Composed by Nikolai Rimsky-Korsakov, arranged by Billy May
  Performed by Al Hirt
57. The Outer Limits
  Composed by Dominic Frontiere
58. Dark Shadows
  Composed by Bob Cobert
59. Ben Casey
  Composed by David Raksin
60. Medical Center*
  Composed by Lalo Schifrin
61. The NBC Mystery Movie*
  Composed by Henry Mancini
62. ABC's Wide World of Sports
  Composed by Jack Shaindlin and Irving Robbins
63. The Jackie Gleason Show ("Melancholy Serenade")*
  Composed by Jackie Gleason
64. The Smothers Brothers Comedy Hour ("The Brothers Theme")
  Composed by Mason Williams and Nancy Ames
65. Monty Python's Flying Circus ("The Liberty Bell")
  Composed by John Philip Sousa
  Performed by Band of the Grenadier Guards

== Credits ==
- Steven Gottlieb - Executive Producer

== Reception ==
Alongside Television's Greatest Hits, Volume 1, the compilation was described by CD Review as "organized as a theoretical average viewing day". CD Review jokingly commented that the compilation would be "highly effective during interrogations" by the FBI.

According to Allmusic, "There are 65 television themes here, and apart from the little mistakes, they're almost all interesting. Among the strangest material here is the music from some of television's failures, such as It's About Time (one of the longest theme songs ever done for TV) and The Green Hornet. Also pleasing is the fact that the producers have used opening and closing theme versions of this material grafted together, so we hear the fullest possible versions of the themes from Ben Casey."
