= One Simple Word =

Studio album by the Connells
- Released: October 8, 1990
- Recorded: 1990
- Studios: Rockfield (Monmouthshire, Wales)
- Genres: Alternative rock, jangle pop, indie rock
- Length: 47:55
- Label: TVT Records
- Producer: Hugh Jones

The Connells chronology
Fun & Games (1989)	One Simple Word (1990)	Ring (1993)

Singles from One Simple Word
- 1. "Stone Cold Yesterday" Released: 1990; 2. "Get a Gun" Released: 1991

Professional ratings
Review scores
Source	Rating
AllMusic	4.5/5 stars

One Simple Word is the fourth studio album by the American alternative rock band the Connells, released in October 1990.

In the US, the album peaked at #168 on the Billboard 200, where it spent 18 weeks on the chart. The singles "Stone Cold Yesterday" and "Get A Gun" charted at #3 and #24, respectively, on the Billboard Hot Modern Rock Tracks chart.

== Critical reception ==
Trouser Press called the album the band's "tightest, catchiest and least wimpy effort to date."

== Track listing ==
1. "Stone Cold Yesterday" (Mike Connell, Doug MacMillan) - 3:57
2. "Speak To Me" (Connell, MacMillan) - 3:56
3. "All Sinks In" (Connell) - 3:13
4. "Get A Gun" (Connell) - 4:23
5. "What Do You Want?" (George Huntley) - 3:10
6. "Set the Stage" (Connell) - 5:47
7. "One Simple Word" (Connell) - 4:21
8. "Another Souvenir" (MacMillan) - 4:20
9. "Link" (Huntley) - 1:27
10. "The Joke" (Huntley) - 3:04
11. "Too Gone" (Connell, MacMillan) - 2:25
12. "Waiting My Turn" (Connell, MacMillan) - 4:37
13. "Take A Bow" (Connell) - 3:15

== Personnel ==
The Connells

- Doug MacMillan - lead vocals
- Mike Connell - guitar, backing vocals; lead vocals on "Waiting My Turn"
- George Huntley - guitar, backing vocals, piano; lead vocals on "What Do You Want?", "Link" and "The Joke"
- David Connell - bass
- Peele Wimberley - drums, percussion

Additional personnel

- Robert Lord - keyboards
- Caroline Lavelle - cello, vocals
- Roddy Lorimer - trumpet
- Kate St. John - oboe, English horn, cor anglais
- Hugh Jones - background vocals

Technical personnel

- Hugh Jones - producer, engineer
- Simon Dawson - assistant engineer
- Arun Chakraverty - mastering
