= Television's Greatest Hits: In Living Color =

Television's Greatest Hits, Volume 5: In Living Color

Compilation album
- Released: 1996
- Label: TVT Records

chronology
Television's Greatest Hits, Volume 4: Black & White Classics (1996)	Television's Greatest Hits, Volume 5: In Living Color (1996)	Television's Greatest Hits, Volume 6: Remote Control (1996)

Television's Greatest Hits: In Living Color, prefaced with "TeeVee Toons Presents", is a 1996 compilation album of 65 television theme songs from the 1960s and 1970s released by TVT Records as the fifth volume of the Television's Greatest Hits series.

The album catalog was later acquired by The Bicycle Music Company. In September 2011, Los Angeles-based Oglio Records announced they were releasing the Television's Greatest Hits song catalog after entering into an arrangement The Bicycle Music Company. A series of 9 initial "6-packs" including some of the songs from the album has been announced for 2011.

== Track listing ==
1. A1 Stingray
2. A2 Thunderbirds
3. A3 Gigantor
4. A4 Cool McCool
5. A5 The Go-Go Gophers
6. A6 The World of Commander McBragg
7. A7 Secret Squirrel
8. A8 The Atom Ant Show
9. A9 Wacky Races
10. A10 Hong Kong Phooey
11. A11 Super Chicken
12. A12 Tom Slick Racer
13. A13 H.R. Pufnstuf
14. A14 Land of the Lost
15. A15 Sigmund and the Sea Monsters
16. A16 Banana Splits ("The Tra La La Song" (AKA "One Banana, Two Banana"))
17. B1 Chico and the Man
18. B2 Please Don't Eat the Daisies
19. B3 The Ghost & Mrs. Muir
20. B4 Nanny and the Professor
21. B5 Here Come the Brides ("Seattle")
22. B6 The Flying Nun ("Who Needs Wings To Fly")
23. B7 Family Affair
24. B8 The Dating Game
25. B9 The Newlywed Game
26. B10 Let's Make a Deal
27. B11 All My Children
28. B12 General Hospital ("Autumn Breeze")
29. B13 Peyton Place ("Wonderful Season of Love")
30. B14 Mary Hartman, Mary Hartman ("Premiere Occasion (You Have Never Been In Love)")
31. C1 Gentle Ben
32. C2 Skippy the Bush Kangaroo
33. C3 The Life and Times of Grizzly Adams ("Maybe")
34. C4 The High Chaparral
35. C5 The Big Valley
36. C6 Cimarron Strip
37. C7 Laredo
38. C8 The Men From Shiloh
39. C9 It Takes a Thief
40. C10 The Magician
41. C11 Switch
42. C12 Felony Squad
43. C13 Police Woman
44. C14 The Men
45. C15 Cannon
46. C16 Judd, for the Defense
47. C17 Emergency!
48. C18 Police Story
49. D1 The Six Million Dollar Man
50. D2 The Bionic Woman
51. D3 The Girl from U.N.C.L.E.
52. D4 Night Gallery
53. D5 Kolchak: The Night Stalker
54. D6 The Invaders
55. D7 Land of the Giants
56. D8 Lost In Space
57. D9 Olympic Fanfare
58. D10 Masterpiece Theatre
59. D11 Hullabaloo
60. D12 Where the Action Is ("Action")
61. D13 Happening '68
62. D14 This Is Tom Jones ("It's Not Unusual")
63. D16 Rowan & Martin's Laugh-In ("Inquisitive Tango")
64. D15 The Dean Martin Show ("Everybody Loves Somebody")
65. D16 The Carol Burnett Show ("Carol's Theme")
