= Steve Gottlieb (music executive) =

American entrepreneur and former music executive

- Born: March 9, 1957 (age 69)
- Occupations: Entrepreneur, former music executive
- Children: 1
- Musical career
- Years active: 1985–2008
- Label: TVT Records

Steve Gottlieb is an American entrepreneur and former music executive. He is founder and CEO of Shindig, a defunct platform for online video chat events. Prior to Shindig, Gottlieb founded the independent record label TVT Records and its publishing arm TVT Music, and produced the "Television's Greatest Hits" series.

== Biography ==
Gottlieb grew up in New Rochelle, New York, and attended Harvard Law School. Earlier, he earned a B.A. in literature from Yale University

Gottlieb was selected in 1996 as one of the "40 Under Forty" leading New York executives by Crain's New York Business. In 2005, he was named to the Hip Hop Power 30 by The Source magazine.

In 2009, Gottlieb founded the video chat plattform Shindig.event.

== Music career ==
=== Television's Greatest Hits ===
In 1986, Gottlieb produced Television's Greatest Hits, which he released on his label Tee Vee Toons. The double album featured 65 themes from hit TV shows of the 1950s and 1960s.

=== TVT Records ===
Gottlieb signed artists to his label, which he renamed TVT Records. TVT grew, and was named independent label of the year by Billboard Magazine and Soundscan for 2000, 2001, 2002, 2003, 2004, and 2005. In the early 2000s, Gottlieb offered the TVT library as free downloads and provided its repertoire to digital music retailers, including Rhapsody, Liquid Audio, and Napster. TVT Records was sold to The Orchard.

=== TVT Music ===
Under Gottlieb's direction, TVT Music Publishing was begun in 1990.TVT Music Publishing was sold to Reservoir Media Management in 2010.

=== Independent Music and Digital Music ===
In 2000, Gottlieb assembled independent label executives to establish the American Association of Independent Music, to represent the interests of American independent music labels. In 2001, Gottlieb appeared before the Senate Judiciary Committee at a hearing entitled "Online Entertainment And Copyright Law: Coming Soon To A Digital Device Near You”, speaking about independent labels and changes in the music business.
