= Television's Greatest Hits: Cable Ready =

Television's Greatest Hits, Volume 7: Cable Ready

Compilation album
- Released: 1996
- Label: TVT Records

chronology
Television's Greatest Hits, Volume 6: Remote Control (1996)	Television's Greatest Hits, Volume 7: Cable Ready (1996)	Television's Greatest Hits: All-Time Top 100 TV Themes (2005)

Television's Greatest Hits: Cable Ready, prefaced with "TeeVee Toons Presents", is a 1996 compilation album of television theme songs from the 1980s and early 1990s released by TVT Records as the seventh volume of the Television's Greatest Hits series.

The album catalog was later acquired by The Bicycle Music Company. In September 2011, Los Angeles–based Oglio Records announced they were releasing the Television's Greatest Hits song catalog after entering into an arrangement The Bicycle Music Company. A series of 9 initial "6-packs" including some of the songs from the album has been announced for 2011.

== Track listing ==
1. A1 The Simpsons
2. A2 The Ren & Stimpy Show ("Dog Pound Hop")
3. A3 The Brothers Grunt
4. A4 Duckman
5. A5 The Adventures of Pete & Pete ("Hey Sandy")
6. A6 Space Ghost Coast to Coast
7. A7 Clarissa Explains It All
8. A8 Barney & Friends ("Barney Theme Song"/"Barney is a Dinosaur")
9. A9 Where in the World Is Carmen Sandiego?
10. A10 Saved by the Bell
11. B1 Major Dad
12. B2 My Two Dads ("You Can Count on Me")
13. B3 Blossom ("My Opinionation")
14. B4 Full House ("Everywhere You Look")
15. B5 Empty Nest ("Life Goes On")
16. B6 Family Matters ("As Days Go By")
17. B7 The Cosby Show ("Kiss Me")
18. B8 A Different World
19. B9 Roc
20. B10 The Fresh Prince of Bel-Air
21. B11 Home Improvement ("Iron John's World")
22. B12 Roseanne
23. B13 Seinfeld
24. B14 Mad About You ("Final Frontier")
25. B15 It's Garry Shandling's Show ("It's Garry Shandling's Theme")
26. B16 The John Larroquette Show
27. B17 Hudson Street
28. B18 The Single Guy
29. B19 Davis Rules
30. B20 Murphy Brown
31. B21 The Nanny ("The Nanny Named Fran")
32. B22 Designing Women ("Georgia On My Mind")
33. B23 Doogie Howser, M.D.
34. C1 Wings
35. C2 Anything But Love
36. C3 Evening Shade
37. C4 The Days and Nights of Molly Dodd
38. C5 Sisters
39. C6 I'll Fly Away
40. C7 Thirtysomething
41. C8 My So-Called Life
42. C9 Beverly Hills, 90210
43. C10 Melrose Place
44. C11 The Heights ("How Do You Talk To An Angel")
45. C12 21 Jump Street
46. C13 In the Heat of the Night
47. C14 Midnight Caller
48. D1 America's Most Wanted
49. D2 Unsolved Mysteries
50. D3 Sledge Hammer!
51. D4 The Equalizer ("The Equalizer Busy Equalizing")
52. D5 NYPD Blue
53. D6 Law & Order
54. D7 Twin Peaks
55. D8 Star Trek: The Next Generation
56. D9 Alien Nation
57. D10 Lois & Clark: The New Adventures of Superman
58. D11 Tales From the Crypt
59. D12 Quantum Leap
60. D13 Max Headroom
61. D14 Liquid Television
62. D15 HBO Feature Presentation
63. D16 The Tracey Ullman Show ("You're Thinking Right")
64. D17 The Kids in the Hall ("Having an Average Weekend")
65. D18 Late Show with David Letterman
