= Television's Greatest Hits: 70's and 80's =

Television's Greatest Hits, Volume 3: '70s & '80s

Compilation album
- Released: 1987
- Genre: Rock, pop
- Label: TVT (TVT 1300)
- Producer: Steven Gottlieb

chronology
Television's Greatest Hits, Volume 2: 65 More TV Themes from the '50s & '60s (1986)	Television's Greatest Hits, Volume 3: '70s & '80s (1987)	TeeVee Toons: The Commercials (1989)

Television's Greatest Hits: '70s & '80s, prefaced with "TeeVee Toons Presents", is a 1987 compilation album of television theme songs released by TVT Records as the third volume of the Television's Greatest Hits series. It was recorded at Studio 900 and mastered at Bernie Grundman Studio.

The album catalog was later acquired by The Bicycle Music Company. In September 2011, Los Angeles–based Oglio Records announced they were releasing the Television's Greatest Hits song catalog after entering into an arrangement The Bicycle Music Company. A series of 9 initial "6-packs" including some of the songs from the album had been announced for 2011.

== Track listing ==
1. Sesame Street ("Can You Tell Me How To Get To Sesame Street?")
2. The Muppet Show
3. The Alvin Show
4. Speed Racer ("Go, Speed Racer, Go!")
5. Mr. Magoo
6. Inspector Gadget
7. The Smurfs ("La La Song")
8. Dastardly & Muttley ("Stop The Pigeon")
9. Scooby-Doo
10. Fat Albert and the Cosby Kids ("Gonna Have A Good Time")
11. The Archies
12. Josie and the Pussycats
13. Dudley Do-Right
14. Fractured Fairy Tales
15. Cheers ("Where Everybody Knows Your Name")
16. The Bob Newhart Show ("Home To Emily")
17. The Greatest American Hero ("Believe It Or Not")
18. Welcome Back, Kotter ("Welcome Back")
19. Room 222
20. WKRP In Cincinnati
21. Taxi ("Angela")
22. Barney Miller
23. Three's Company ("Come And Knock On Our Door")
24. Happy Days
25. Laverne & Shirley ("Making Our Dreams Come True")
26. The Facts of Life
27. Good Times
28. One Day at a Time ("This Is It")
29. Gimme a Break!
30. Maude ("And Then There's Maude")
31. The Jeffersons ("Movin' On Up")
32. All In the Family ("Those Were The Days")
33. Sanford and Son ("The Streetbeater")
34. Dallas
35. Dynasty
36. Knots Landing
37. L.A. Law
38. St. Elsewhere
39. Marcus Welby, M.D.
40. M*A*S*H ("Suicide Is Painless")
41. The Waltons
42. Little House On the Prairie
43. Hart to Hart
44. Charlie's Angels
45. Wonder Woman
46. The Love Boat
47. American Bandstand ("Bandstand Boogie")
48. Solid Gold
49. Entertainment Tonight
50. Miami Vice
51. S.W.A.T.
52. Baretta ("Keep Your Eye On The Sparrow")
53. The Streets of San Francisco
54. Barnaby Jones
55. Starsky & Hutch ("Gotcha")
56. The Rookies
57. Kojak
58. The A-Team
59. The Name of the Game
60. Quincy, M.E.
61. Hill Street Blues
62. Simon & Simon
63. Magnum, P.I.
64. The Rockford Files
65. Saturday Night Live

== Credits ==
- Design – Beth Cumber
- Engineer – Tony Battaglia
- Engineer [Assistant] – David Kennedy
- Executive Producer – Steven Gottlieb
- Photography – Tom Russell
- Producer – Bob Mintzer
- Recorded By – Bernie Grundman
