= TeeVee Toons: The Commercials =

Compilation album by Various Artists
- Released: 1989
- Label: TVT Records

Various Artists chronology
Television's Greatest Hits, Volume 3: '70s & '80s (1987)	TeeVee Toons: The Commercials (1989)	Television's Greatest Hits, Volume 4: Black & White Classics (1996)

Professional ratings
Review scores
Source	Rating
Allmusic	3/5 stars

TeeVee Toons: The Commercials is a 1989 compilation album of television advertising jingles and commercials released as a spinoff to the Television's Greatest Hits series created by the record label Tee-Vee Toons, later known as TVT Records.

== Overview ==
According to a review in Allmusic, "If nothing else, this album proves that TV ads stick to the brain, despite the best of intentions. Upon first hearing these jingles, listeners will be amazed to find themselves singing along spontaneously, and surprised at how they come back to full consciousness in spite of not having been heard (most of them) for decades. That said, it's great fun to hear most of these commercials dealing with food, cigarettes, household cleaners, beer, cars, and soft drinks, among other products. Within the history of these ads, listeners hear the voices of personalities such as Edie Adams and Dinah Shore. Also, included is the original Coke commercial that led to the pop hit "I'd Like to Teach the World to Sing. A great album for trivia buffs and couch potatoes."

The album catalog was later acquired by The Bicycle Music Company. In September 2011, Los Angeles-based Oglio Records announced they were releasing the Television's Greatest Hits song catalog after entering into an arrangement with The Bicycle Music Company.

== Track listing ==
1. "Snap, Crackle, Pop" (Rice Krispies)
2. "I'm a Chiquita Banana" (Chiquita Bananas)
3. "Choo-Choo Charlie" (Good & Plenty)
4. "If You Like Fluff Fluff Fluff" (Marshmallow Fluff)
5. "Sometimes You Feel Like a Nut" (Almond Joy and Mounds Candy Bars)
6. "There's Nothing Like the Face of a Kid" (Hershey's Chocolate Bars)
7. "Do You Know Exactly How" (Oreo Cookies)
8. "Candy-Coated Popcorn, Peanuts and a Prize" (Cracker Jack)
9. "I'd Like To Buy the World a Coke" (Coca-Cola)
10. "It's the Real Thing" (Coca-Cola)
11. "Things Go Better With Coke" (Coca-Cola)
12. "Come Alive" (Pepsi Cola)
13. "Be a Pepper" (Dr Pepper)
14. "The San Francisco Treat" (Rice-A-Roni)
15. "The Dogs Kids Love To Bite" (Armour Hot Dogs)
16. "Fruit Juicy" (Hawaiian Punch)
17. "I Love Bosco" (Bosco)
18. "N-E-S-T-L-E-S" (Nestlés Quik Chocolate Flavor)
19. "It's Slinky" (Slinky)
20. "Meet the Swinger" (Polaroid Swinger)
21. "Oh, Fab, I'm Glad" (Fab Laundry Detergent)
22. "Stronger Than Dirt" (Ajax Laundry Detergent)
23. "Mr. Clean, Mr. Clean" (Mr. Clean All-Purpose Cleaner)
24. "Use Ajax, the Foaming Cleanser" (Ajax cleanser)
25. "My Dog's Better Than Your Dog" (Ken-L Ration Dog Food)
26. "Meow, Meow, Meow, Meow" (Meow Mix Cat Food)
27. "In the Middle, In the Middle, In the Middle" (NYS Department of Safety)
28. "When You Say Bud" (Budweiser Beer)
29. "Here's To Good Friends" (Löwenbräu Beer)
30. "If You've Got the Time" (Miller High Life)
31. "Schaefer Is the One Beer To Have" (Schaefer Beer)
32. "When You're Out of Schlitz" (Schlitz Beer)
33. "A Completely Unique Experience" (Colt .45 Malt Liquor)
34. "My Beer Is Rheingold, the Dry Beer" (Rheingold Beer Extra Dry)
35. "Add a Ring" (Ballantine Premium Lager Beer)
36. "Hey, Get Your Cold Beer" (Ballantine Premium Lager Beer)
37. "To a Smoker, It's a Kent" (Kent Cigarettes)
38. "Winston Tastes Good" (Winston Cigarettes)
39. "You Can Take Salem Out of the Country" (Salem Cigarettes)
40. "Theme from 'The Magnificent Seven'" (Marlboro Cigarettes)
41. "Like Father, Like Son" (Health PSA)
42. "See the U.S.A." (Chevrolet Motors)
43. "Texaco Star Theme" (Texaco)
44. "Pick One Up and Smoke It Sometime" (Muriel Cigars)
45. "Hey, Big Spender" (Muriel Cigars)
46. "A Little Dab'll Do Ya" (Brylcreem)
47. "Dippity Do, Dippity Do" (Dippity Do Styling Gel)
48. "The Stripper" (Noxzema Shaving Cream)
49. "How're You Fixed For Blades" (Gillette Blue Blades)
50. "Look Sharp March" (Gillette Blue Blades)
51. "The Mariner" (Old Spice Long-Lasting Cologne)
52. "Chock Full o' Nuts Is That Heavenly Coffee" (Chock Full o'Nuts Coffee)
53. "Nobody Doesn't Like Sara Lee" (Sara Lee)
54. "Plop Plop Fizz Fizz" (Alka-Seltzer Effervescent Antacid)
55. "The Shape Your Stomach's In" (Alka-Seltzer Effervescent Antacid)
