= Too Gone =

Too Gone may refer to:

- "Too Gone", song by The Connells from One Simple Word, 1990
- "Too Gone", song by Rich the Kid from The World Is Yours, 2018
