= Steadman's Wake =

Studio album by The Connells
- Released: September 24, 2021
- Genre: Alternative rock; jangle pop
- Length: 42:49
- Label: Black Park Records
- Producer: John Plymale

The Connells chronology
Old School Dropouts (2001)	Steadman's Wake (2021)

Steadman's Wake is the ninth studio album by the American band The Connells. It was released on September 24, 2021, and is the band's first album of new material in 20 years.

== Background and reception ==
Recorded largely during the COVID-19 lockdown, the album deals with themes such as Mike Connell's own interior world, his relationships and family life, and the broader landscape of his homeland as it struggles under the yoke of Trumpism, according to Americana UK. The album deals with more personal themes than the band's previous work and includes three remakes of tracks from Old School Dropouts.

The album received general acclaim. The Indy Review considered it both timeless and nostalgic, and said "The Connells may be one of the last bands of their era to still be standing and running on all gears."

== Track listing ==
All songs written by Mike Connell, Mike Ayers, David Connell, Tim Harper, Rob Ladd, Doug MacMillan, and Steve Potak, except where noted.

No.	Title	Writer(s)	Length
1.	"Really Great"	Mike Connell, Mike Ayers, David Connell, Rob Ladd, Doug MacMillan, and Steve Potak	2:27
2.	"Fading In (Hardy)"	Mike Connell, Mike Ayers, David Connell, Rob Ladd, Doug MacMillan, and Steve Potak	4:24
3.	"Steadman's Wake"	Mike Connell, Mike Ayers, David Connell, Rob Ladd, Doug MacMillan, and Steve Potak	4:27
4.	"Rusted Fields"		4:21
5.	"Song For Duncan"	Mike Connell, Mike Ayers, Rob Ladd, and Robert Sledge	4:20
6.	"Gladiator Heart"		4:17
7.	"Burial Art"		3:33
8.	"Universal Glue"		3:40
9.	"Stars"	Mike Connell, Mike Ayers, David Connell, Tim Harper, Rob Ladd, Doug MacMillan, Steve Potak, and Joel Rhodes	3:13
10.	"Hello Walter"		3:39
11.	"Helium"		4:22
Total length:			42:49

== Personnel ==
The Connells

- Mike Connell - Guitar, Vocals
- Doug MacMillan - Vocals
- David Connell - Bass, Vocals
- Steve Potak - Piano, Organ, Wurlitzer, Synth, Vocals
- Mike Ayers - Guitar, Synthesizer, Vocals
- Rob Ladd - Drums, Vocals

Additional Players

- Mike Mole - Trumpet on "Fading In (Hardy)", "Stars", and "Helium"
- Robert Sledge - Bass on "Really Great" and "Song for Duncan"
- John Brown - Double Bass on "Song for Duncan"
- Christy Connell - Backing Vocals on "Rusted Fields", "Steadman's Wake", and "Hello Walter"
- Rosie Leavell - Cello on "Song for Duncan" and "Steadman's Wake"

Recording and Production

- Produced by John Plymale for Mad Anthony Productions, Inc.
- Recorded by John Plymale at Overdub Lane and Mitch Easter at Fidelitorium
