= All-Time Top 100 TV Themes =

Tee-Vee Toons Presents All-Time Top 100 TV Themes

Compilation album
- Released: 2005
- Label: TVT Records

chronology
Television's Greatest Hits, Volume 7: Cable Ready (1996)	Tee-Vee Toons Presents All-Time Top 100 TV Themes (2005)	Television's Greatest Hits: Classic Sitcoms (2011)

All-Time Top 100 TV Themes, prefaced on the cover with "Tee-Vee Toons Presents", is a two-disc compilation album of television theme songs released by TVT Records in 2005 as a spinoff of the Television's Greatest Hits series. It included 100 themes taken from the seven volumes of the series plus newer themes from television programs that debuted after the last volume was released in 1996. Notably excluded was any Western themed television series.

== Reception ==
Ed Bark of The Dallas Morning News called the album "a brisk 1 hour, 47 minute, 27 second trip through a memory-jogging TV landscape replete with some pretty great music and a few ear-hurters, too". The State journalist Neil White wrote "the CDs are packed with memorable tunes". Film Score Monthly reviewed the album.

== Track listing ==
=== Disc 1 ===
1. Six Feet Under
2. Sex and the City
3. Ally McBeal
4. Will & Grace
5. Everybody Loves Raymond
6. Frasier
7. Friends
8. Late Show With David Letterman
9. Mad About You
10. Melrose Place
11. Beverly Hills 90210
12. Law & Order
13. Northern Exposure
14. The Simpsons
15. Thirtysomething
16. Full House
17. 21 Jump Street
18. L.A. Law
19. Pee-Wee's Playhouse
20. Perfect Strangers
21. Growing Pains
22. Moonlighting
23. Who's The Boss?
24. Miami Vice
25. Night Court
26. The A-Team
27. St. Elsewhere
28. Cheers
29. Knight Rider
30. Cagney & Lacey
31. The Greatest American Hero
32. Hill Street Blues
33. Dynasty
34. Magnum, P.I.
35. The Facts of Life
36. Diff'rent Strokes
37. WKRP In Cincinnati
38. Taxi
39. Dallas
40. Fantasy Island
41. The Love Boat
42. Soap
43. Eight Is Enough
44. Three's Company
45. Wonder Woman
46. Charlie's Angels
47. The Muppet Show
48. Alice
49. What's Happening!!
50. Laverne & Shirley

=== Disc: 2 ===
1. One Day at a Time
2. Welcome Back, Kotter
3. Barney Miller
4. Starsky and Hutch
5. S.W.A.T.
6. The Jeffersons
7. Police Woman
8. The Rockford Files
9. Good Times
10. The Six Million Dollar Man
11. M*A*S*H
12. The Waltons
13. Maude
14. Sanford and Son
15. All in the Family
16. The Partridge Family
17. The Odd Couple
18. The Mary Tyler Moore Show
19. Happy Days
20. Sesame Street
21. Love, American Style
22. The Courtship of Eddie's Father
23. The Brady Bunch
24. Scooby-Doo
25. Hawaii Five-O
26. The Banana Splits
27. The Newlywed Game
28. The Dating Game
29. The Monkees
30. Batman
31. I Dream of Jeannie
32. The Wild Wild West
33. Green Acres
34. Gilligan's Island
35. The Addams Family
36. Bewitched
37. The Jetsons
38. The Dick Van Dyke Show
39. The Andy Griffith Show
40. The Flintstones
41. My Three Sons
42. The Twilight Zone
43. Leave It to Beaver
44. Perry Mason
45. The Honeymooners
46. Merrie Melodies
47. Looney Toons
48. Dragnet
49. I Love Lucy
50. The Lone Ranger
