= Hats Off =

Hats Off may refer to:

- Hats Off (1927 film), a Laurel and Hardy film
- Hats Off (1936 film), directed by Boris Petroff
- Hats Off (2008 film), a documentary about Mimi Weddell
- Hats Off (Chet Baker album), a 1966 album by Chet Baker
- Hats Off (Roy Harper album), a 2001 album by Roy Harper
- Hats Off (EP), an EP by The Connells
- "Hats Off" (song), a song by Lil Baby, Lil Durk and Travis Scott
- "Hats Off", a song by Alabama from the album Greatest Hits Vol. II
- "Hats Off", a song by Primus from the album Brown Album
- "Hats Off!", a song by Proud Mary from the album Love and Light
- Hat tip, doffing one's hat
