= Heavy (film) =

1995 American drama film by James Mangold

- Theatrical release poster
- Directed by: James Mangold
- Written by: James Mangold
- Produced by: Richard Miller
- Starring: Shelley Winters; Liv Tyler; Deborah Harry; Joe Grifasi; Evan Dando; Pruitt Taylor Vince
- Cinematography: Michael F. Barrow
- Edited by: Meg Reticker
- Music by: Thurston Moore
- Production company: Available Light Productions
- Distributed by: Cinépix Film Properties
- Release dates: January 20, 1995 (Sundance); June 5, 1996 (New York City); June 28, 1996 (Los Angeles)
- Running time: 105 minutes
- Country: United States
- Language: English
- Box office: $941,414

Heavy is a 1995 American independent drama film written and directed by James Mangold, in his directorial debut. It stars Liv Tyler, Pruitt Taylor Vince, Shelley Winters, and Deborah Harry. The plot focuses on an unhappy overweight cook (Vince) whose life is changed after an enchanting college drop-out (Tyler) begins working as a waitress at his and his mother's roadside tavern. The film explores themes of loneliness, false hope, unrequited love, and self-worth.

Mangold wrote the screenplay for Heavy while attending filmmaking seminars at Columbia University and partly based it on real people he knew while growing up in Upstate New York. Filming took place on location in and around Barryville and Hyde Park in 1993; some scenes were filmed at the Culinary Institute of America's campus there. (Note: The Culinary Institute is featured throughout the film, identified by its sign in front of the building; interior locations are also used.) The film features an original soundtrack by Thurston Moore, as well as songs by Evan Dando of The Lemonheads, who also has a minor role in the film.

Heavy premiered at the Sundance Film Festival where it won the Special Jury Prize and was later screened at Cannes where it competed for the Caméra d'Or. The film received a theatrical release in the United Kingdom on December 29, 1995, and later had a limited release in the United States on June 5, 1996.

== Plot ==
In rural Upstate New York, 30-something Victor Modino works as a cook at Pete and Dolly's, a small roadhouse founded by and named after his now-deceased father and elderly mother. Dolly, who is in poor health, spends her days sitting in a chair in the back of the kitchen, reminiscing about her late husband Pete and antagonizing Delores, a cynical longtime employee who once had an affair with him. The daily rhythm of the restaurant is disrupted when Dolly hires a new waitress, Callie, a soft-spoken young woman who has just dropped out of college in Syracuse. Callie immediately catches the eye of the painfully shy, overweight Victor. Delores takes Dolly's hiring of the beautiful but inexperienced Callie as a personal slight to herself and treats Callie coldly.

During working hours, Callie is impervious to Victor's debilitating shyness and attempts to get to know him better. Impressed by Victor's cooking skills, Callie suggests he attend the nearby Culinary Institute of America, which is considered by Victor but swiftly dismissed by both Dolly and Delores. Victor quickly becomes enamored of Callie and begins dieting and subtly trying to gain her attention, despite learning she has a steady boyfriend.

Dolly suffers a heart attack and is hospitalized. Victor tells Delores and Callie that Dolly is having minor surgery. Several days later, Dolly dies while Victor is eating lunch in the hospital cafeteria. The grieving Victor does not tell anyone of her death, but runs the restaurant as usual, and deals with his grief by binge eating. Delores soon becomes suspicious about Dolly's extended absence and also makes sexual advances towards Victor, which he rejects.

One night at the restaurant, Callie argues with her boyfriend Jeff and then in her anger tells off Delores in front of the customers. Delores' alcoholic friend Leo later assaults Victor for not taking Delores' side. Callie is left stranded at the restaurant and Victor drives her home, stopping en route so they can watch airplanes descend at an airfield. As they watch the airplanes, Callie becomes emotional over her lack of direction in life, and she and Victor end up kissing, but Callie quickly ends the encounter.

Callie asks Victor to take her to visit Dolly in the hospital, and unable to confess that Dolly is dead, he agrees. The next morning, Callie arrives at Victor's house to accompany him to the hospital, but instead Victor drives her to the local cemetery and shows her Dolly's fresh grave. Callie becomes hysterical and later fails to turn up for her restaurant shifts. Leo and Delores find out, via a hospital employee, that Dolly died weeks ago and berate Victor for not telling them, then depart together, leaving Victor alone in the restaurant. In his rage and grief, Victor smashes items behind the counter. Later that evening, Callie arrives with Jeff to tell Victor she's quitting and to collect her final paycheck. She spends a few minutes alone with Victor, explaining that she plans to go back to college, but promising to come back and visit him sometime.

In the final scenes, Victor begins to emerge from his grief over Dolly's death. He stops binge eating, starts cleaning up the kitchen which he has neglected, and even musters the confidence to chat with Darlene, an attractive cashier at the local grocery market who also shows an interest in him.

== Cast ==
- Pruitt Taylor Vince as Victor Modino
- Shelley Winters as Dolly Modino
- Liv Tyler as Callie
- Deborah Harry as Delores
- Joe Grifasi as Leo
- Evan Dando as Jeff
- David Patrick Kelly as Grey Man in the Hospital
- Marian Quinn as Darlene
- Meg Hartig as Donna
- Zandy Hartig as Jean
- Peter Ortel as Tony
- J. C. MacKenzie as Gas Man
- Allen D'Arcangelo as Sonny

== Production ==
=== Conception ===
Heavy was director James Mangold's directorial debut, as well as his first solo screenplay. According to Mangold, who grew up in the Hudson River Valley, he was inspired by a real-life classmate of his who was overweight and whose mother owned a local diner; like in the film, the father had died, leaving the mother and son to run the restaurant themselves. In directing his first feature, Mangold aspired to make a film stripped of "a certain Hollywood aesthetic," that followed a character who seemed a "most unlikely centerpiece of a motion picture."

Mangold wrote the script for the film in 1991 while attending filmmaking seminars at Columbia University under the instruction of director Miloš Forman. In making the movie, Mangold was very focused on expression versus dialogue, especially in the character of Victor; Mangold stated that he was striving to create a "silent film, with sound." Peter Bogdanovich's The Last Picture Show (1971) and Martin Ritt's Hud (1963) served as specific influences.

=== Casting ===
Mangold met Liv Tyler when she was sixteen years old; Tyler had little to no acting history but expressed great interest in it. She had been doing modeling work at the time and was cast in the film "without hesitation" after a brief video audition with Mangold. Through Tyler, Mangold got in touch with Deborah Harry, who was well acquainted with young Tyler through the "rock and roll" scene in New York (Tyler being the daughter of Aerosmith front man Steven Tyler); this resulted in Harry's casting as the part of the weathered, bad-mouthing Delores. Evan Dando of The Lemonheads was cast as Tyler's guitarist boyfriend because of Mangold's admiration for his music and in hopes of bringing some star attention to the low-budget production.

Pixies frontman Black Francis was originally meant to be cast in the role of Victor but did not feel it was right for a debut acting role. In casting the part of Dolly, Mangold sought golden age Hollywood actress Shelley Winters, who was in her mid-70s at the time. Mangold tracked down the address to her Manhattan apartment and sent her the film script along with a letter stating his admiration of her work. Within two days, Winters replied to Mangold and was subsequently cast.

The last person to be cast was Pruitt Taylor Vince, as Mangold had been having trouble finding an actor to portray the "centerpiece" character. An associate producer/friend of Mangold, who had been shooting Nobody's Fool (1994) with Vince alongside Paul Newman, suggested him. After Vince was cast, Mangold and the crew began feeding Vince doughnuts and Kentucky Fried Chicken in order for the actor, who was not remarkably overweight at the time, to rapidly gain weight before filming commenced.

== Release ==
Heavy premiered in January 1995 at the Sundance Film Festival, where Mangold won the Special Jury Prize for directing. It subsequently screened at the Cannes Film Festival Directors Fortnight, where it was nominated for the Caméra d'Or award.

=== Box office ===
Distributor Cinépix Film Properties released Heavy theatrically in the United States after Liv Tyler had received recognition for her starring role in Bernardo Bertolucci's Stealing Beauty (1996). The film opened in the United States in the summer of 1996, premiering it in New York City on June 5, earning $14,425 during its opening weekend. It premiered in Los Angeles on June 28, 1996. The release was limited, expanding to only 22 screens nationwide. The film concluded its domestic theatrical run on November 28, 1996, with a total box office gross of $941,414.

=== Critical response ===
Following the film's success at Sundance, it garnered generally positive reviews. Roger Ebert gave the film three-and-a-half out of four stars and remarked about its sense of realism: "You've been in places like this. You linger over a second cup of coffee and people-watch, trying to guess the secrets of the sad-eyed waitress and the drunk at the bar and the pizza cook who looks like he's serving a sentence. You don't guess the true horror of the place, which is that there are no secrets, because everyone here knows all about everyone else, inside and out, top to bottom, and has for years." A decade later, Ebert — reviewing Mangold's 2007 remake of 3:10 to Yuma — called Heavy "extraordinary."

Jay Carr of The Boston Globe praised the film as a "small gem [that] specifies a world and populates it with unerring authority and a sure instinct for character." The Statesman Journal's Ron Cowan similarly lauded the film for its deliberate lack of dialogue, stating that Mangold "often eschews" it, "detailing his story with gestures, glances, and touches. There is no sex, violence, or clichéd action or plot twists, just a sense that you're listening in on real life." The New York Daily News's Jami Bernard described the film as a "slice of life" mood piece, praising Tyler's performance as "forceful," adding that "the film moves as carefully as Vincent [sic] himself, as if afraid to displace too many molecules at once. It's a welcome respite from the crash-bang movies of summer." Barbara Creed of the Australian publication The Age noted the film as a "delicate and remarkable debut" and likened elements of it to the Carson McCullers novel The Ballad of the Sad Café.

Critic James Berardinelli wrote that "Mangold captures the nuances of life perfectly, and, by never cheapening his vision through facile resolutions, he fashions a memorable cinematic portrait." Berardinelli subsequently included the film in his book, Reel Views: The Ultimate Guide to the Best 1,000 Modern Movies in 2005. Kevin Thomas of the Los Angeles Times called the film "a small, quiet miracle of a movie in which tenderness, compassion, and insight combine to create a tension that yields a quality of perception that's almost painful to experience", comparing its cinematography to the work of R.W. Fassbinder and remarking the effectiveness of Thurston Moore's score for the film. Edward Guthmann of the San Francisco Gate called the film "an act of faith in itself — an argument for the kind of subtle, humanistic traces that used to be familiar on screen but somehow became all too scarce," while Barbara Shulgasser of the San Francisco Chronicle noted: "There is nothing cutesy or gimmicky about Heavy, which may be why something in its grimness recalls the work of Ingmar Bergman."

Other critics were less laudatory of the film, including Jeff Millar of the Houston Chronicle who wrote: "Even at 80 minutes, Heavy would have been weighted with redundancies. So you can imagine what happened on the way to making it 105 minutes long." Michael Wilmington of the Chicago Tribune felt its portrayal of its characters was exploitative, noting: "Instead of the poetry of common people, Heavy romanticizes the mundane or grotesque. Mangold seems to be trying to revive some of the emotional quality of the late '40s-early '50s work of Southern Gothic writers like Carson McCullers, Truman Capote, and Tennessee Williams. But presenting Victor as an exemplary sufferer – a wounded soul trapped in the body of a lovelorn pizza cook, with Farrah Fawcett posters in his bedroom – makes him a little ridiculous, without quite making him funny. In Heavy, the sensitivity is so thick, the characters can hardly breathe."

On the review aggregator website Rotten Tomatoes, the film holds an approval rating of 88% based on 32 reviews. The website's critics consensus reads, "With Pruitt Taylor Vince's naturalistic performance and sympathetic direction from James Mangold, Heavy soars as an affecting exploration of loneliness."

=== Home media ===
Columbia TriStar Home Video released Heavy on DVD on September 21, 1999.

== Accolades ==
Year	Institute	Category	Nominee	Result	Ref.
1995	Cannes Film Festival	Caméra d'Or	James Mangold	Nominated	
1995	Sundance Film Festival	Special Jury Prize	James Mangold	Won	
1995	Sundance Film Festival	Grand Jury Prize Dramatic	James Mangold	Nominated	
1995	Grand Prix Asturias	Best Screenplay	James Mangold	Won	
1995	Best Feature	Gijón International Film Festival	Heavy	Won	

== Soundtrack ==
The soundtrack of the movie featured instrumental compositions by Thurston Moore among other songs. The soundtrack was released on CD on June 5, 1996 (the same day as the film's theatrical release in the United States) through TVT Records.

=== Track listing ===
No.	Title	Artist	Length
1.	"Victor and Callie"	Thurston Moore	1:32
2.	"Hot Coals"	Evan Dando	3:51
3.	"Pile Up"	The Plimsouls	3:24
4.	"Box Cars"	Rosie Flores	5:15
5.	"Undertow"	T. Moore	1:28
6.	"Frying Pan"	E. Dando	3:08
7.	"Carry Me"	The Vidalias	3:52
8.	"Howard Is a Drag"	The Rake's Progress	3:33
9.	"My Heart Belongs to Only One"	Ben Vaughn	3:08
10.	"California Thing"	Freedy Johnston	3:00
11.	"Kissing on the Bridge"	T. Moore	1:15
12.	"Lost"	The Plimsouls	3:59
13.	"'74–'75"	The Connells	4:37
14.	"The Dream of Sarah"	Eleni Mandell	2:46
15.	"How Much I've Lied"	E. Dando	2:10
16.	"Spinning Goodbye"	T. Moore	3:16
17.	"Culinary Institute"	T. Moore	3:19

== Sources ==
- Berardinelli, James (2005). Reel Views: The Ultimate Guide to the Best 1,000 Modern Movies on DVD and Video. Vol. 2. Lanham, Maryland: Justin, Charles & Co. ISBN 978-1-932-11240-5.
- Levy, Emanuel (1999). Cinema of Outsiders: The Rise of American Independent Film. New York City: New York University Press. ISBN 978-0-814-75289-0.
- Mangold, James (1999). Heavy (DVD audio commentary). Sony Pictures Home Entertainment.
