= '74–'75 =

1993 single by the Connells

- Single cover

Single by the Connells

from the album Ring
- B-side: "New Boy"
- Released: 1993
- Recorded: March 1993
- Studio: Dreamland (Bearsville, New York)
- Genre: Rock; indie rock
- Length: 4:36
- Label: TVT
- Songwriter: Mike Connell
- Producers: The Connells; Lou Giordano

Music video
- "'74–'75" on YouTube

"'74–'75" is a song by American band the Connells from their fifth studio album, Ring (1993). The acoustic ballad was released by TVT Records as the album's third single in 1993, but it did not chart in the United States. It would later become a European hit for the band in 1995, reaching the top 10 in a total of 11 European countries and peaking at No. 1 in Norway and Sweden. It also charted within the top 30 of the UK Singles Chart on two occasions. Since the Connells never had another hit, they are widely seen as a one-hit wonder.

The music video, directed by Mark Pellington, features students from Needham B. Broughton High School's Class of 1975 and compares the photographs from their yearbook, with how they look and have aged since then. NME ranked "'74–'75" number 50 in their list of "NME Writers' Top 50 Singles" in December 1995.

== Background ==
The song is built around an Am-C-G-Am chord progression. Mike Connell said it "was pretty much just another failed relationship song" that took influence from older bands such as the Byrds and Big Star and more contemporary artists including Echo & the Bunnymen, R.E.M., the Replacements and Teenage Fanclub. Connell was living in a one-bedroom apartment in his hometown of Raleigh, North Carolina when he began writing the song in early 1991, and he struggled for months to finish the lyrics. Connell remained grateful that the record label did not attempt to influence his writing, as "at the height of the grunge era, 1993, they sure as hell would not have suggested that we come up with an acoustic-based, mid-tempo snoozer."

The song reached Europe two years later when A&R representatives from the Intercord label requested to issue the album Ring in Germany. Connell expected Ring to sell a few thousand copies at most, but the surprise success of "'74–'75" propelled it to the 45th-best selling album of Germany in 1995. Decades after its success, Connell remained confused about how the song became so popular. "I think the tune is catchy enough, but it’s really kind of a snoozer," he said. Lead vocalist Doug MacMillan said, "I wouldn't have released that song as a single either" but compared the song's melancholic emotional tone to that of Blue Öyster Cult's "(Don't Fear) The Reaper".

== Critical reception ==
In his weekly UK chart commentary in Dotmusic, James Masterton described "'74–'75" as a "gently strummed song". A reviewer from Music Week rated it three out of five, adding, "Commercially alternative with a capital C, this laid-back, rootsy, countrified single drifts through the ears pretty agreeably. Expect a positive response from nostalgic radio programmers." Rob Ross of Popdose called it "emotionally-charged and poignant." Michael Hann of The Guardian said the song was a "masterful piece of mass market soft-pop songwriting." John Robinson from NME declared it as "an already near-classic AOR swoon which finds the redoubtable Peele, his quaintly named chums Steve Potak, Doug, George, and the brothers Connell sifting through their high school graduation year books and checking the sideburns. And — sniff, parp — haven't we all changed?" American magazine Trouser Press described it as "so sweet [it] borders on cloying".

== Chart performance ==
"'74–'75" became a hit in Europe in 1995, particularly in Sweden and Norway, where it topped the singles charts. In Belgium, Denmark, France, Iceland, and Switzerland, it reached the top five. In Germany, the song peaked at No. 7 and remained on the chart for 28 weeks. The single also reached the top 10 in Austria, Ireland, and the Netherlands. "'74–'75" was the band's only top-20 hit in the United Kingdom, where it peaked at No. 14 in August 1995. In March 1996, the single re-appeared on the UK Singles Chart at No. 21. The song ended 1995 as Europe's 23rd-best-performing song, climbing to No. 8 on the Eurochart Hot 100. Following the songs's success, the Connells embarked on a European tour with Def Leppard.

== Music video ==
The accompanying music video for the song was directed by American film director, writer, and producer Mark Pellington. It was shot at Needham B. Broughton High School in the band's hometown Raleigh, North Carolina in 1993, and features members of the Class of 1975, juxtaposing yearbook pictures with footage of the same people as they appeared in 1993. On November 14, 2015, to mark the 40th anniversary of the 1974–1975 class, a remixed video of the song was released, showing the class members as they looked 22 years after the original video was released.

== Formats and track listings ==
- 7-inch single

A. "'74–'75" – 4:36
B. "New Boy" (live at the Purple Dragon Studio in Atlanta, GA) – 4:44

- French CD single
1. "'74–'75" (album version) – 4:36
2. "Logan Street" – 3:39
- European maxi-CD single
1. "'74–'75" (album version) – 4:36
2. "Logan Street" – 3:39
3. "Fun & Games" (live at the Purple Dragon Studio in Atlanta, GA) – 3:07
4. "New Boy" (live at the Purple Dragon Studio in Atlanta, GA) – 4:44
- UK cassette single
1. "'74–'75" – 4:36
2. "New Boy" (live at the Purple Dragon Studio in Atlanta, GA) – 4:44

== Credits and personnel ==
Credits are lifted from the European maxi-CD single and the Ring album booklet.

Studios

- Recorded in March 1993 at Dreamland Studios (Bearsville, New York)
- Mixed in April 1993 at Carriage House Studios (Stamford, Connecticut)
- Mastered at Sterling Sound (New York City)

The Connells

- Mike Connell – music, words, vocals, guitar
- David Connell – bass
- George Huntley – vocals, guitar, mandolin
- Doug MacMillan – vocals, guitar
- Peele Wimberley – drums, percussion
- Steve Potak – piano, organ, keyboards
- The Connells – production

Recording and production

- Lou Giordano – production, mixing
- David Cook – engineering

== Charts ==
=== Weekly charts ===
Chart (1995)	Peak position
Austria (Ö3 Austria Top 40)	6
Belgium (Ultratop 50 Flanders)	2
Belgium (Ultratop 50 Wallonia)	9
Denmark (IFPI)	5
Europe (Eurochart Hot 100)	8
Europe (European AC Radio)	8
Europe (European Alternative Rock Radio)	7
Europe (European Hit Radio)	10
Finland Airplay (Radiosoittolista)	1
France (SNEP)	4
France Airplay (SNEP)	1
Germany (GfK)	7
Holland Airplay (Music & Media)	2
Iceland (Íslenski Listinn Topp 40)	2
Ireland (IRMA)	6
Israel (Israeli Singles Chart)	1
Italy (Musica e dischi)	14
Italy Airplay (Music & Media)	2
Latvia (Latvijas Top 20)	5
Netherlands (Dutch Top 40)	8
Netherlands (Single Top 100)	10
Norway (VG-lista)	1
Poland Airplay (Music & Media)	7
Scottish Singles Sales (Official Charts)	11
Sweden (Sverigetopplistan)	1
Switzerland (Schweizer Hitparade)	3
UK Singles (Official Charts)	14
UK Airplay (Music Week)	8

Chart (1996)	Peak position
Scottish Singles Sales (Official Charts)	16
UK Singles (Official Charts)	21
UK Airplay (Music Week)	49

=== Year-end charts ===
Chart (1995)	Rank
Austria (Ö3 Austria Top 40)	35
Belgium (Ultratop 50 Flanders)	23
Belgium (Ultratop 50 Wallonia)	44
Europe (Eurochart Hot 100)	23
Europe (European AC Radio)	7
Europe (European Alternative Rock Radio)	4
Europe (European Hit Radio)	9
France (SNEP)	33
France Airplay (SNEP)	7
Germany (Media Control)	23
Holland Airplay (Music & Media)	14
Iceland (Íslenski Listinn Topp 40)	4
Israel (Israeli Singles Chart)	7
Italy (Musica e dischi)	73
Italy Airplay (Music & Media)	6
Latvia (Latvijas Top 50)	56
Netherlands (Dutch Top 40)	57
Netherlands (Single Top 100)	97
Sweden (Topplistan)	10
Switzerland (Schweizer Hitparade)	14
UK Airplay (Music Week)	46

== Certifications ==
Region	Certification	Certified units/sales
Germany (BVMI)	Gold	250,000^{^}
Norway (IFPI Norway)	Platinum	
Sweden (GLF)	Gold	25,000^{^}
United Kingdom (BPI)	Silver	200,000^{‡}
^{^} Shipments figures based on certification alone.^{‡} Sales+streaming figures based on certification alone.

== Influence ==
Fran Healy of Scottish band Travis has said that he wrote "Writing to Reach You" while listening to "'74–'75" on the radio.

== See also ==
- List of number-one songs in Norway
- List of number-one singles and albums in Sweden
