= The Stories Are True =

2006 album by Time Again

Studio album by Time Again
- Released: April 24, 2006 (EU); April 25, 2006 (US)
- Studio: West Beach Studios (Hollywood, CA)
- Genre: Punk rock
- Length: 27:58
- Label: Hellcat
- Producers: Tim Armstrong (exec.); Time Again

Time Again chronology
Time Again EP (2005)	The Stories Are True (2006)	Darker Days (2008)

Professional ratings
Review scores
Source	Rating
AllMusic	3.5/5 stars

The Stories Are True is a debut full-length album by the American street punk band Time Again. It was released on April 25, 2006, via Hellcat Records. Tim Armstrong is featured on the title track "The Stories Are True" and appeared on its music video.

== Track listing ==
No.	Title	Length
1.	"Junkies"	1:27
2.	"Say Again"	1:44
3.	"Broken Bodies"	2:00
4.	"The Stories Are True" (featuring Tim Armstrong)	3:18
5.	"Cold Concrete"	2:14
6.	"Lost In Hollywood"	1:37
7.	"Fallen Nation"	2:17
8.	"Kenny"	2:47
9.	"Criminals"	1:00
10.	"Life On the Run"	2:00
11.	"Fountain and Formosa"	2:10
12.	"Deadly Nights"	2:08
13.	"Streetwalker"	3:09

== Personnel ==
- Daniel Dart - vocals
- Elijah Reyes - guitar
- Brian Burnham - bass
- Ryan Purucker - drums
- Tim Armstrong - vocals (track 4)
- John Morrical - mixing (track 4)
- Ben Meyer - mixing
- Gene Grimaldi - mastering
- Rachel Tejada - photography

== Release history ==
Region	Date	Format(s)	Label(s)
Europe	April 24, 2006	CD; Digipak	Hellcat Records
United States	April 25, 2006	CD; Digipak; digital download	Hellcat Records
