= Daniel Dart =

American singer

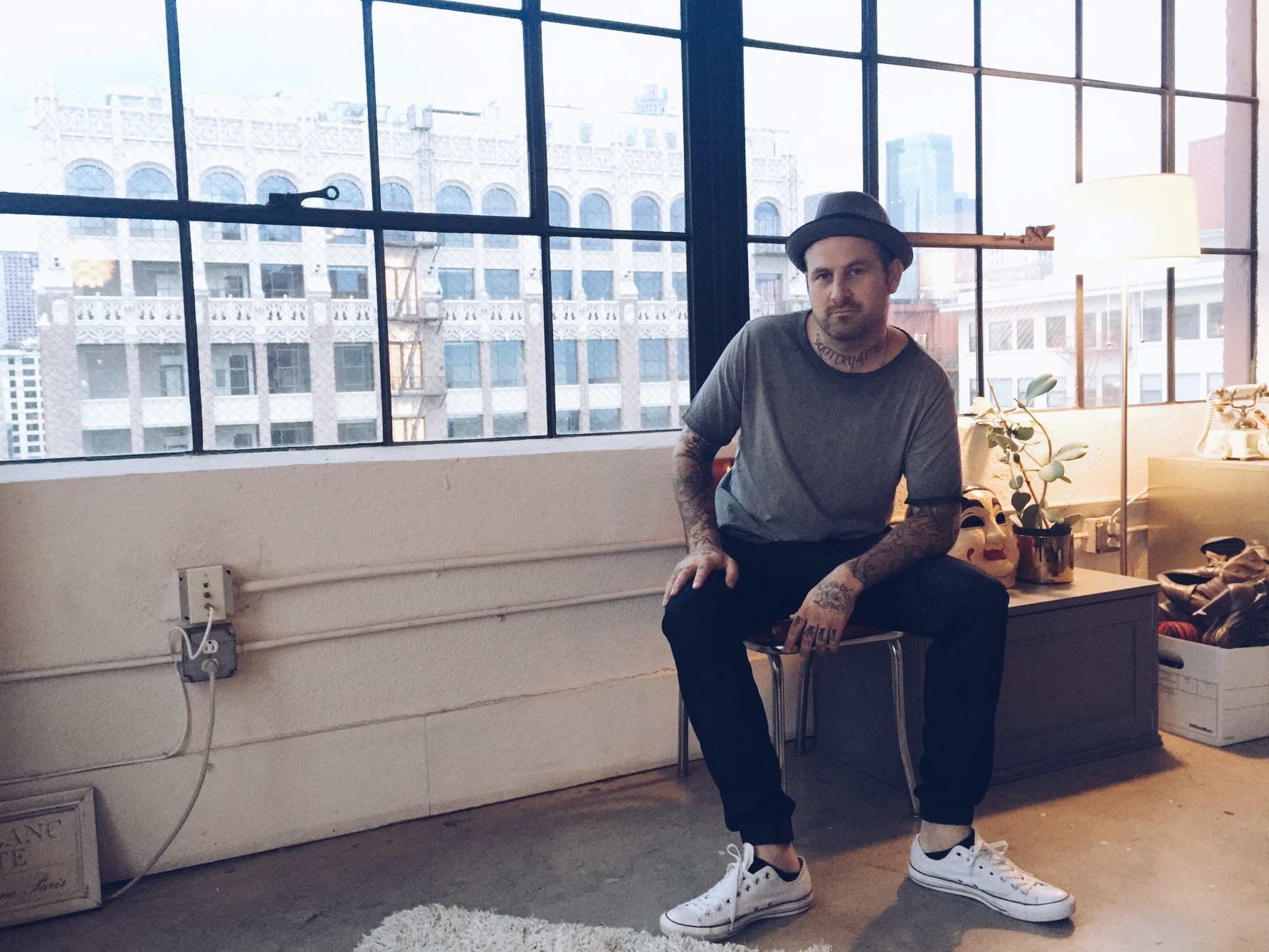
- Dart in downtown Los Angeles loft (2015)
- Occupations: Singer, songwriter, music producer, photographer

Daniel Dart is an American singer-songwriter, music producer, photographer, and human rights advocate who made his name as the founder and frontman for punk band Time Again. He has composed original music for such feature films as Get Him To The Greek, Stepbrothers, The Haunting in Connecticut as well as the TV show Dr. Phil. In early 2015, he founded the company that would evolve into DEC Projects, focused on working in the world's most difficult places.

Dart earned an Executive MBA from MIT in 2024, where he was the first formerly incarcerated student in the school's history and a recipient of the Dean's Fellowship, Sloan Leadership Fellowship, and Pechacek Fellowship. He is currently the founder of and a general partner at Rock Yard Ventures: a venture capital firm that invests in tech-focused logistics start-ups.

In January 2025, Dart announced that he would be launching a podcast titled The Dart Board.

== Early life ==
Dart's early life and his troubles growing up and dealing with drug addiction and family problems have been well documented. He often cites his own personal experiences as influences in his lyrics and the direction of the music he writes and creates. He also cites his difficulties growing up as the reason for his heavy activity in volunteer and non-profit work. He talks easily with people about his past and the difficulties he has had to face and overcome.

== Time Again ==
In 2004, Dart was discovered by Rancid frontman and guitar player Tim Armstrong and two years later signed to Armstrong's label Hellcat Records. On Time Again's first record, The Stories Are True, Armstrong joined Dart on the song as they both sing about facing the troubles of the world and how the stories of both are true. Dart announced plans for a new Time Again record titled May The Bridges We've Burned Light The Way hinting at a release in early 2016.

== Producing / Composing / The Riot Bros ==
From 2008 to 2011, Dart owned a recording studio in Hollywood with long-time friend and partner Donal Finn called Riot Riot Studios. The two worked out of this studio under the pseudonym, The Riot Bros. During this time they also recorded two records under the name Swapmeet Shakedown/The Riot Bros, of which songs have been used in TV shows Shameless on Showtime, Blacklist and NBC's Under The Dome. The two composed original music for television and film advertising as well, working on projects such as Jennifer's Body, All About Steve, The Haunting in Connecticut, The International, and New In Town among others.

Dart also produced and worked on many other various projects during this time. Ranging from MC Lars and Mighty Mighty Bosstone's to projects with Ne-Yo and original music for commercial enterprises such as The Haunted Mansion at Disneyland.

== DEC Artists ==
In early 2015, Dart started his own Talent Management company DEC Artists (Dart Entertainment and Creative Artists) with his first client being his former songwriting and producing partner Donal Finn. He made a sizable leap by signing his first major client, the #1 BillBoard charting band The Crash Kings shortly after. DEC Artists roster at one time included actor/ musician Devon Werkheiser, Jurassic 5's Soup (Jurassic 5), Grammy award-winning artist Salvador Santana, songwriter/composer Antonio Beliveau, Los Angeles street artist Teacher, Time Again and actor/ musician Brad Carter among others. He also worked with Brian Bell of Weezer and British icon Seal. In 2017, as Dart began focusing more on social impact work, he changed the name of the company to DEC Projects and moved away from management.

== Legal trouble ==
In late 2011, Dart was arrested on multiple charges including kidnapping, carjacking, dissuading a witness, and assault, among others. He was originally sentenced to 6 years although he denied any wrongdoing vehemently. In 2013 he won an appeal and was released shortly thereafter in 2014. He originally did not speak publicly about this after being released, but in June 2015 while announcing the revival of Time Again he finally spoke out in Czech Republic magazine Kids and Heroes about how winning his appeal and getting released was one of the most victorious days of his life.

He has since become a leading voice in the criminal justice reform movement. In January 2016, Dart was invited to speak in Washington, D.C. at the AFL–CIO Martin Luther King Jr Civil Rights conference about his experience and how he is working to help others in similar situations.

== DEC Projects ==
What began in 2015 as DEC Artists officially evolved in 2017 to DEC Projects, an impact-focused strategy and development firm whose tagline is - Creating Global Campaigns & Content That Raise Awareness + Change Culture.

=== DoMore104 with Duplass Brothers and Wounded Warrior Project ===
In July 2017, Dart teamed up with Mark Duplass and Wounded Warrior Project to create a campaign called DoMore104. The campaign launched and ran during the lead up to Duplass Brothers HBO series Room 104, as a way to both promote the new show, but also as a way to raise money and bring awareness to issues wounded veterans face.

=== May Day Action ===
Dart co-created and produced a national call to action and event in partnership with CASA de Maryland, UFCW, and SEIU and the AFL–CIO in Washington DC on May 1 calling for comprehensive immigration reform. The event took place in Lafayette Square in front of the White House and featured DNC Chair Tom Perez and Rep. Luis Gutiérrez.

=== A Day Without Immigrants ===
He created and appeared in a series of PSA/call-to-action videos for Movimiento Cosecha calling for support of a national strike and economic boycott on May 1, 2017. The goal is to create solidarity and protection for immigrants from all origins.

=== This Is My Home ===
In 2016, Dart created the #ThisIsMyHome campaign for immigrant rights with Salvador Santana for We Are Casa and CASA in Action (CASA de Maryland). The campaign focused around creating awareness across the United States with specific calls to action in the hopes of achieving comprehensive immigration reform.

=== CA Prop 57 ===
In 2016, Dart wrote and directed a public service announcement television ad endorsing California Proposition 57 (2016) for Californians for Governor Brown for public safety and rehabilitation for Governor Jerry Brown's ballot measure committee and the California Democratic Party.

== Film and television ==
Dart was the Executive Producer of Leather Bound (2016) and Producer for Rylo (2017).
