= Time Again =

Punk rock band

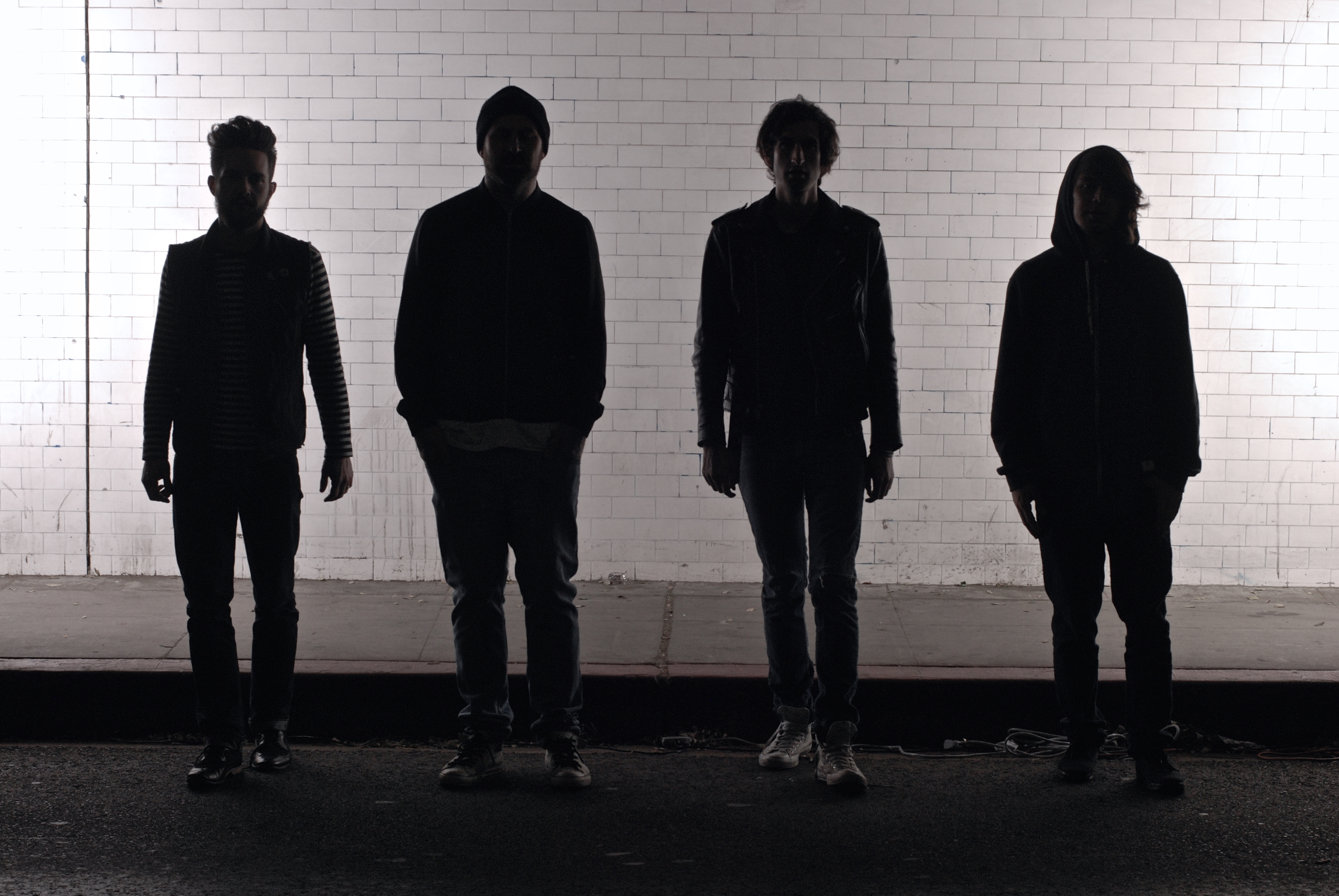
- Time Again in 2015

Background information
- Origin: Hollywood, California
- Genres: Punk rock, street punk
- Years active: 2004–present
- Labels: Dropout, Hellcat
- Members: Daniel Dart; John Doe
- Past members: Oren Soffer; Brian Burnham; Ryan Purucker; Kris Idol; Elijah Reyes; Jake Margolis
- Website: wearetimeagain.com

Time Again is a punk rock band from Los Angeles founded in 2004. which is represented in the band's songs and album art. The band was formed in the summer of 2004 by Daniel Dart, Elijah Reyes. Before they even had a full band or a single song written, they began printing stickers and flyers for Time Again to heavily promote their band, resulting in numerous shows being booked. Time Again only came together as a full band a few days before their first show. The band says all their musical influences are Rancid, The Clash, and Op Ivy. In June 2005, Time Again released a self-titled EP on Rancid Records. This EP would result in heavy radio play on several Los Angeles radio stations, including XM Fungus 53 which would name the EP as one of the top 25 albums of 2005, and the song "I Go Back" as one of the top 10 songs of 2005. It included a cover of Rancid's song "Tattoo". The band released their debut full-length, The Stories are True, on April 25, 2006, on Hellcat Records.

In August 2006 Brian Burnham left the band (he is currently in Mad Marge and the Stonecutters) and was replaced with Oren Soffer.

Tim Armstrong appeared on the band's single "Stories Are True" on their first full-length album Stories Are True.

The band released their new album Darker Days in early 2008.

Before their 2008 fall tour, Ryan Purucker left the band to return to his home state of Alaska, and was replaced with Jake Margolis.

In order to fill the time while Elijah was on his mission, Daniel Dart has formed a post-punk new wave band by the name of Stormy California with long-time friend and producing partner Donal Finn, which will be releasing records via Dexter Holland's (Offspring) Nitro Records.

Daniel Dart and fellow Stormy California member Donal Finn have also released a limited edition blues album via interpunk.com on April 5, 2010 under the name "Swapmeet Shakedown". the two, Daniel Dart & Donal Finn have also formed a production team known as "The Riot Bros" based out of Hollywood in Daniel Dart's "Riot Riot Studios" full commercial studio and the two are actively producing up and coming punk and rock n' roll bands as well as co-writing with bands such as "Shiny Toy Guns" Sisely Treasure, pop singer "Natalie Nylon" as well as composing music for films such as Stepbrothers, Clash of the Titans, Get Him to the Greek and Jennifer's Body just to name a few, in order to stay active and creative while awaiting the return of Elijah.

As Elijah left to serve as a Mormon missionary in South Korea and will not be returning, Kris Idol replaced Elijah on guitar for Time Again.

With the incarceration of lead singer Daniel Dart and death of guitarist Kris Idol, Time Again is in a strange transition period, and currently Daniel is the only active members of the band. Late in 2012 Daniel sent an update from prison informing everyone that he is doing fine and in good spirits, and also confirmed that Time Again is not finished and that they will be back and stronger than ever once his sentence is up.

== Band members ==
- Daniel Dart — vocal (2004–present)
- John Doe — drums (2015–present)

== Former members ==
- Brian Burnham — bass (2004–2005)
- Ryan Purucker — drums (2005–2008)
- Elijah Reyes — guitar (2004–2009)
- Oren Soffer — bass (2006–2010)
- Kris Idol — guitar (2009–2011)
- Jake Margolis; drums (2008–2010)

== Discography ==
- Time Again (EP), Rancid Records, 2005

- Daniel Dart, Brian Burnham, Elijah Reyes, Ryan Purucker (except "Never Give Up" – Daniel Dart, Brian Burnham, Jesse Hoy, Elijah Reyes)

- The Stories Are True, Hellcat Records, 2006

- Daniel Dart, Brian Burnham, Elijah Reyes, Ryan Purucker (except "The Stories Are True" – Tim Armstrong sung with Daniel Dart)

- Darker Days, Hellcat Records, 2008

- Daniel Dart, Oren Soffer, Elijah Reyes, Ryan Purucker

- (Naked), Drop-Out Records, 2009

- Daniel Dart, Donal Finn, Oren Soffer, Jake Margolis
