= Television's Greatest Hits =

Music album series of television theme songs

Cover of Television's Greatest Hits, Volume 5: In Living Color

Television's Greatest Hits is a series of albums containing recordings of TV theme songs through the years. The series was first introduced in 1985 by the newly created Tee-Vee Toons (TVT) record label and ran until 1996. Each of the original seven numbered volumes contains 65 theme songs, with each volume focusing on particular decades. A spin-off volume containing commercial jingles was released in 1989.

A compilation of popular tracks from the series was issued by TVT in 2005 as All-Time Top 100 TV Themes. TVT's catalog was later acquired by Bicycle Music Company and tracks from the series have been rereleased by Oglio Records in genre-themed compilations since 2011.

== History ==
=== TVT Records ===
TVT Records was launched in 1985 with the release of Television's Greatest Hits' first volume, the double LP compilation 65 TV Themes! From the '50s and '60s. The album featured theme songs from classic TV shows, and it became a respectable seller. The San Francisco Chronicle called the album "the most fun you can have with your pants on", and the New York Times highlighted it as one of 1985's most notable business ideas. It featured 65 themes from television shows ranging from the mid-1950s until the late 1960s, including tracks from The Bugs Bunny Show, Popeye, The Dick Van Dyke Show, I Love Lucy, The Twilight Zone, and many others.

Television's Greatest Hits, Volume 2: 65 More TV Themes from the '50s & '60s

The second volume, 65 More TV Themes from the '50s & '60s, was released in 1986, and included themes from Mister Rogers' Neighborhood, Mighty Mouse Playhouse, Merrie Melodies, I Spy, Monty Python's Flying Circus. 70's and 80's, the third volume, was released in 1987. A spinoff volume in 1989, The Commercials, included a number of jingles and commercials from different eras. According to a review in Allmusic, "Upon first hearing these jingles, listeners will be amazed to find themselves singing along spontaneously, and surprised at how they come back to full consciousness in spite of not having been heard [most of them] for decades. That said, it's great fun to hear most of these commercials dealing with food, cigarettes, household cleaners, beer, cars, and soft drinks, among other products." The series then went on hiatus, with TVT returning in 1996 with the fourth volume, Black & White Classics, and releasing three more volumes in prompt succession that year. The format of the original eight-volume series became widely imitated by other record labels.

The catalog was later acquired by The Bicycle Music Company, an independent publisher and rights holder that has acquired catalog rights to musicians such as Nine Inch Nails, Cyndi Lauper, Pete Seeger, Third Eye Blind, Arlo Guthrie, and Sublime.

=== Oglio Records Reissues ===
In September 2011, Los Angeles-based Oglio Records announced they were releasing the Television's Greatest Hits song catalog after entering into an arrangement with The Bicycle Music Company. Starting in September 2011, Oglio began releasing television themes bundled into "6-packs", starting with Classic Sitcoms and with announced 2011 releases for eight more volumes such as Cop Shows, Adventure, Detective Shows, and Classic Comedy. Oglio has distribution agreements with INgrooves, Fontana, and Universal.

== Discography ==
=== TVT series ===
Year	Volume	Title
1985	1	Television's Greatest Hits: 65 TV Themes! From the '50s and '60s
1986	2	Television's Greatest Hits, Volume 2: 65 More TV Themes from the '50s & '60s
1987	3	Television's Greatest Hits, Volume 3: '70s & '80s
1989	-	TeeVee Toons: The Commercials
1996	4	Television's Greatest Hits, Volume 4: Black & White Classics
1996	5	Television's Greatest Hits, Volume 5: In Living Color
1996	6	Television's Greatest Hits, Volume 6: Remote Control
1996	7	Television's Greatest Hits, Volume 7: Cable Ready
2005	-	Tee-Vee Toons Presents All-Time Top 100 TV Themes

=== Oglio series ===
Year	Volume	Title
2011	1	Classic Sitcoms
2011	2	Cop Shows
2011	3	Adventure
2011	4	Classic Kids
2011	5	Westerns
2011	6	'60s Sitcoms
2011	7	Classic Sitcoms II
2011	8	Detective Shows
2011	9	Classic Comedy
2012	10	Young Drama
2012	11	Law & Order
2012	12	Crime Drama
2012	13	Family Fun
