= Juster =

Juster may refer to:

== People named Juster ==
- A. M. Juster (born 1956), American poet
- Kenneth Juster (born 1954), American Under Secretary of Commerce at the Bureau of Industry and Security
- Norton Juster (1929–2021), American architect and writer
- Samuel Juster (1896–1982), American architect of New York

== Companies ==
- DePace & Juster, defunct architecture firm based in New York City
