= The Connells =

American rock band

- The Connells in 1996

Background information
- Origin: Raleigh, North Carolina, United States
- Genres: Alternative rock; jangle pop; indie rock
- Years active: 1984–present
- Labels: TVT Records, Black Park Records
- Members: David Connell; Mike Connell; Doug MacMillan; Steve Potak; Mike Ayers; Rob Ladd
- Past members: John Schultz; George Huntley; Peele Wimberley; Joel Rhodes; Steve Ritter; Chris Stephenson
- Website: www.theconnells.com

The Connells are an American musical group from Raleigh, North Carolina. They play a guitar-oriented, melodic, jangle-pop style of rock music with introspective lyrics that often reflect the history or culture of the American South.

Though the band has released little content since 2001, they have never officially broken up and continue to occasionally perform to the present. In the United States, the Connells had three top 10 hits on the Billboard Alternative Songs chart, but they are best known for their song "'74–'75", which was a number one hit in Norway and Sweden in 1995 while reaching the top 10 in 11 European countries.

== Early history (1984–87) ==
Guitarist Mike Connell formed the band in 1984 along with his brother David Connell on bass, Doug MacMillan on lead vocals, and future filmmaker John Schultz on drums. This initial four-person line-up was quickly supplemented by the addition of George Huntley on second guitar, keyboards, and vocals. Around the same time, former Johnny Quest drummer Peele Wimberley replaced Schultz, finalizing the "classic" line-up of the band.

An early version of "Darker Days", recorded by the band's initial four-piece lineup, appeared on the North Carolina indie compilation More Mondo in 1984. A re-recorded version of "Darker Days" provided the title track to the band's debut album, which was produced by fellow North Carolinian Don Dixon. The album was released in 1985 on Elvis Costello's Demon Records in the UK and the band's own Black Park Records label in the U.S., with slightly different track listings for each country. In addition to the title track, one of the most notable songs on the album was "Hats Off", an attack on then-President Ronald Reagan. After the release of the Darker Days album, the band re-recorded a more aggressive take of "Hats Off" for a 12" single, which was the second Connells release on Black Park, and the last until 2000. During this period, videos for the songs "Seven" and "Hats Off" were aired on MTV's 120 Minutes program.

== College success (1987–93) ==
After touring heavily behind Darker Days, the Connells re-entered the studio in 1986 with producer Mitch Easter to record their second album, Boylan Heights. The decision to work with Easter continued to perpetuate the comparisons to R.E.M. Mike Connell's songwriting on Boylan Heights would provide most of the foundation for the band's live show sound for the remainder of their career. The opener, "Scotty's Lament", featured the most explicit Celtic influence in the band's songbook, while the chorus lyric "I delight in my despair" satirized the band's early image as doom and gloom merchants a la Morrissey and The Smiths. Also notable is that the lyrics for that song originally included the sardonic twist, "I delight in your despair."

"Choose a Side" incorporates synths (played by Huntley), and "Over There" features an ironic military trumpet counter-melody. Closing ballad "I Suppose" was a haunting tribute to the Raleigh upper-class neighborhood of Boylan Heights. Although the band shopped Boylan Heights to various labels, the major record companies, including Columbia Records, which expressed some mild interest, passed on it. The record was ultimately released in 1987 on mid-major TVT Records, which had made its name releasing a series of "Tee Vee Toons" television theme song compilation CDs. TVT would prove to be no commercial match for R.E.M.'s own mid-major label, I.R.S. Records, and over the next decade, the Connells would engage in a series of disputes with the label, on at least one occasion suing, unsuccessfully, to break their recording contract.

Boylan Heights was a substantial college radio hit, and the Connells continued to tour relentlessly. During this period, both Connell and Huntley began to move away from their twelve-string Rickenbackers towards six-string Fender and Gibson guitars, leading to a heavier, less folky sound, although elements of the band's patented jangle were still audible on "Hey Wow", the lead single from Fun and Games, the 1989 follow-up album. Other songs, such as "Something to Say" and "Upside Down" were heavier, featuring power chords, as well as the most self-lacerating lyrics to date from Connell. Fun and Games also saw Huntley's role as a songwriter grow; after contributing one song each to Darker Days and Boylan Heights, Huntley wrote or co-wrote five tracks on Fun and Games, with the anthemic "Sal" quickly becoming one of the most popular songs in the band's live set. CD pressings of Fun and Games included a bonus track, "Fine Tuning".

Fun and Games was quickly followed in 1990 by One Simple Word, which was recorded in Wales with U.K. producer Hugh Jones. Jones had previously produced various British bands that the band had admired. Despite the high quality of the songs and improved playing by the band, notably on the Connell-MacMillan collaboration "Stone Cold Yesterday" and Connell's own "Get a Gun" which were both college radio hits with videos, the band struggled to reach a higher level of success, although "Stone Cold Yesterday" notched the band a No. 3 hit on the Modern Rock Tracks chart, where "Get a Gun" also reached No. 24. This album saw the band stretch their sound and playing further, as on Connell's debut as a lead vocalist, the plaintive ballad "Waiting My Turn", which featured Kate St. John on cor anglais, but also saw the reworking of two songs that dated back to the Darker Days era, "Too Gone" and "Take a Bow". Some critics have contended that the album/tour/album cycle was by this point outstripping Connell's ability to compose new material. This is why the increasing contribution of other songwriters in the band became important as lead vocalist, Doug MacMillan also contributed a song, "Another Souvenir", that he had written on his own.

== "'74–'75" and European success (1993–96) ==
After a three-year recording hiatus, which included more legal jousting with TVT Records and the addition of Steve Potak on keyboards, a rejuvenated Connells released Ring in 1993. Though the lead single, "Slackjawed", was another college radio hit in America, the band was initially disappointed with the album's reception and considered breaking up. However, the follow-up single, "'74–'75", another Celtic-influenced ballad, took off in Europe shortly thereafter and became a top-20 hit across the continent, including in the United Kingdom where it peaked at No. 14 in the UK Singles Chart, as well as Sweden and Norway, where it even managed to top the charts. This led to the band touring extensively in Europe and opening stadium shows for Def Leppard. "'74–'75" won numerous European music awards in the mid-1990s, leading to greater financial and radio success than the band had known to that point. "'74–'75" also appeared in the 1995 film, Heavy. However, while European music fans made Ring a platinum record outside the United States, such high level success in America still remained elusive. Ring reached No. 36 in the UK Albums Chart. Ring also marked the debut of David Connell stepping up as a songwriter by co-writing a song for the record, "Hey You". MacMillan's role as a songwriter also increased on this album, contributing three songs. The band also played "Slackjawed" on Late Night with Conan O'Brien.

== Later career (1996–2001) ==
1996's Weird Food and Devastation expanded the band's sound in new directions, but failed to build on the momentum established by its predecessor. It was produced by the band's longtime soundman, Tim Harper, later known for his production work for Whiskeytown. The title of the album reportedly alluded to the band's impressions of Europe during their seemingly endless tours there in support of "'74–'75". It featured a starker and heavier production than the more melodic Ring. By now, Connell and MacMillan shared songwriting duties about equally, with Connell's style taking a quirkier turn on songs such as "Adjective Song". Lead single "Maybe" was more in line with the anthemic pop songs of the band's early days, but his remaining songs on the album were often odd and dissonant compared to his previous work. "Friendly Time" abandoned coded attacks on Ronald Reagan for coded attacks on rock critics such as Robert Christgau and J. D. Considine. The album also debuted the songwriting efforts of drummer Wimberley with the track “Any”, who also landed an outtake, “Bitter Pill”, on the soundtrack of the film Scream. The band shot music videos for "Maybe" (a parody of the Burt Reynolds film Deliverance) and "Fifth Fret" (which was a parody of the Alfred Hitchcock film Psycho). The band was invited to perform for a second time on Late Night with Conan O'Brien where they performed "Maybe". Their tour for the album was cut short in early 1997 when MacMillan became extremely ill prior to a show. He had been experiencing stomach pains for over a year, but believed it was due to his poor diet while on the road. After undergoing emergency surgery, he was diagnosed with diverticulitis and took several months off to recover.

In 1998, the band released Still Life, which marked their final album for TVT. Produced by Jim Scott, Still Life marked a departure from the harder sound of Weird Food and Devastation with an overall softer feeling reminiscent of Counting Crows and Teenage Fanclub. Mike Connell's contributions to the record included a long-standing song with the band that was originally known as "Brown", which was re-titled "Dull, Brown, and Grey". It was the band's only album to include songwriting contributions from all members, with MacMillan taking a decreased role in the album's writing. Peele Wimberley departed the band later that year and was replaced by Steve Ritter.

The band released Old School Dropouts on the revived Black Park Records label in 2001. The band produced and recorded the record in Steve Potak's studio and promoted it sparingly in the American South. The song "Washington" received some airplay on alternative radio.

== Current activities ==
After the release of Old School Dropouts, George Huntley left the band to spend more time with his family and begin a career in real estate. Mike Ayers was added in George's place on lead guitar. Meanwhile, Peele Wimberley briefly played with another band called Parklife and then moved to Los Angeles to pursue interests in Hollywood and in electronic music. He is currently a member of the Los Angeles band, The Lamps. David, who lost his first wife to cancer, remarried and has a career in landscape painting and art shows, and brother Mike is practicing law in Raleigh. Huntley is now selling real estate and working part-time at the University of North Carolina music department. In 2010, Joel Rhodes played on trumpet and flugelhorn until 2017. After several years with Steve Ritter and Chris Stephenson on drums, Rob Ladd was added as the drummer in early 2012.

Due to family and career commitments, the band does not play together as regularly any more. The performances are normally in the southeastern United States, usually at benefit concerts and music festivals.

The band's catalog was acquired by Bicycle Recording Company, an independent publisher based in Beverly Hills, CA in April 2010 and has reissued the band's TVT catalog digitally through IODA (The Independent Online Distribution Alliance). The releases became available August 31, 2010 on most digital music stores.

As of April 2013, the band was recording new material at Baby Topanga Studios. New songs include "Stars", "Burial Art", "Mr. Lucky", and "Helium".

On September 27, 2014, the Connells celebrated their 30th anniversary with a show in their hometown of Raleigh, NC. The show featured a surprise appearance from original member George Huntley playing and singing on multiple songs throughout the show.

In 2016, the band released a greatest hits album called Stone Cold Yesterday: Best of the Connells.

On January 25, 2020, the band played at Ram's Head Live in Baltimore playing a set that included three songs from a "new record" supposedly coming out in 2020. On October 31, 2020, the Connells played at a live webcast concert at the Cat's Cradle via internet, where they once again play some new songs which are to yet to be released.

On September 24, 2021, the first new studio album in 20 years called Steadman's Wake was released on CD, vinyl and all digital formats. It features eleven new songs, of which three are re-recordings of songs from their previous album. Beforehand, the band released three songs from the new album as singles: "Really Great", "Stars" and the title track "Steadman's Wake".

On May 5, 2023 the band released their first ever live album, "Set the Stage".

== Influences and sound ==
From the beginning of the group, Mike Connell wrote both the music and the lyrics of the majority of the band's songs, although he was not the band's primary lead singer. Connell's influences included the 1960s guitar pop of his childhood, including The Byrds and The Beatles; in an early interview, he stated that the first song he wrote as a teenager was titled "Psychedelic Butterfly".

Connell and other members of the Connells band were also influenced by then-contemporary British bands such as The Smiths and Echo & the Bunnymen. Another, more idiosyncratic, influence was the British progressive rock band Jethro Tull, whose song "Living in the Past" was covered by the Connells on 1995's New Boy EP. Like Peter Buck of R.E.M. and Johnny Marr of The Smiths, Connell and Huntley played Rickenbacker guitars for the first several years of the band's career, creating a jangly, folk-rock sound reminiscent of The Byrds and other Southern U.S. and North Carolina bands of the era, such as the dB's and Let's Active.

Although the Connells were frequently dismissed as R.E.M. imitators due to the Athens, Georgia band's overwhelming popularity relative to that of its contemporaries, there were significant differences between the two bands. First of all, the Connells' influences occurred at the same time that R.E.M.'s influences occurred. Connell and Huntley both played twelve-string Rickenbackers, as opposed to the six-string models favored by R.E.M.'s Buck; this gave the Connells an even janglier sound. Whereas Buck's guitar style featured heavy use of arpeggios, Connell's style was primarily based on strummed open chords in the keys of G and D, with a strong Celtic feel to songs such as "Scotty's Lament" and "'74–'75". Likewise, Connell's lyrics were clearer and more direct than the stream-of-consciousness lyrics of Michael Stipe. The melancholy lyrics of early songs such as "Darker Days" drew comparisons to The Smiths, and an early feature on the band in the Raleigh's Spectator Magazine music weekly dubbed them "Raleigh's local depressants". And the band has a much more melodic bent than their forebears.

== Band members ==
=== Current members ===
- David Connell – bass (1984–present)
- Mike Connell – guitars, lead and backing vocals (1984–present)
- Doug MacMillan – lead and backing vocals, guitars (1984–present)
- Steve Potak – keyboards, organ, piano (1991–present)
- Mike Ayers – guitars (2001–present)
- Rob Ladd – drums (2012–present)

=== Former members ===
- John Schultz – drums (1984–1985)
- George Huntley – guitars, keyboards, piano, lead and backing vocals (1985–2001, 2014)
- Peele Wimberley – drums (1985–1998)
- Steve Ritter – drums (1998–2012)
- Chris Stevenson – drums (2012)
- Joel Rhodes – trumpet and flugelhorn (2010–2017)

== Discography ==
=== Albums ===
- Darker Days (1985)
- Boylan Heights (1987)
- Fun & Games (1989)
- One Simple Word (1990)
- Ring (1993)
- Weird Food and Devastation (1996)
- Still Life (1998)
- Old School Dropouts (2001)
- Steadman's Wake (2021)

=== Extended plays ===
- Hats Off EP (1985)
- New Boy EP (1994)

=== Singles ===
Year	Song	Peak chart positions													Album
Year	Song	AUT	BEL	DEN	FRA	GER	ICE	IRE	NLD	NOR	SWE	SWI	UK	US Alt	Album
1985	"Hats Off"	—	—	—	—	—	—	—	—	—	—	—	—	—	Darker Days
1987	"Over There"	—	—	—	—	—	—	—	—	—	—	—	—	—	Boylan Heights
1989	"Something to Say"	—	—	—	—	—	—	—	—	—	—	—	—	7	Fun & Games
1990	"Stone Cold Yesterday"	—	—	—	—	—	—	—	—	—	—	—	—	3	One Simple Word
1991	"Get a Gun"	—	—	—	—	—	—	—	—	—	—	—	—	24	One Simple Word
1993	"Slackjawed"	—	—	—	—	—	—	—	—	—	—	—	—	9	Ring
1994	"New Boy"	—	—	—	—	—	—	—	—	—	—	—	—	—	Ring
1995	"'74–'75"	6	2	5	4	7	2	6	8	1	1	3	14	—	Ring
1996	"Maybe"	—	—	—	—	—	—	—	—	—	—	—	—	—	Weird Food and Devastation
1998	"Soul Reactor"	—	—	—	—	—	—	—	—	—	—	—	—	—	Still Life
2001	"Gladiator Heart"	—	—	—	—	—	—	—	—	—	—	—	—	—	Old School Dropouts
2021	"Really Great"	—	—	—	—	—	—	—	—	—	—	—	—	—	Steadman's Wake
2021	"Stars"	—	—	—	—	—	—	—	—	—	—	—	—	—	Steadman's Wake
2021	"Steadman's Wake"	—	—	—	—	—	—	—	—	—	—	—	—	—	Steadman's Wake
"—" denotes releases that did not chart or were not released in that region.

== Music videos ==
- Hats Off (1986; directed by Grady Cooper and Demetre Gionis)
- Seven (1986; dir. by Frank Thompson)
- Scotty's Lament (1988; dir. by John Schultz)
- Over There (1988; dir. by Peyton Reed)
- Something to Say (1989)
- Stone Cold Yesterday (1990; dir. by Mark Pellington)
- Get A Gun (1990; dir. by John Schultz)
- Slackjawed (1993; dir. by Peyton Reed)
- '74–'75 (1993; dir. by Mark Pellington)
- New Boy (1993; dir. by Peyton Reed)
- Maybe (1996; dir. by Grady Cooper and Norwood Cheek)
- Fifth Fret (1996; dir. by Phil Harder and Rick Fuller)

== Side and solo projects ==
During the early days of the band, Doug MacMillan often played with other local Raleigh bands. He is also the voice of Captain Stickman in the Captain Stickman vs. Color Black videos.

In 1996, George Huntley released a solo record of additional material that he had written over the years he spent with The Connells, titled Brain Junk. The record was released on The Connells' record label, TVT. Brain Junk featured Huntley's honesty and the trademark jangly guitar work which was evident on early Connells recordings. This effort was quite different from Huntley's contributions to The Connells (such as "Sal", "Doin' You", and "Motel"), and featured a more stripped-down sound. On this record, Huntley explored various styles that did not fit in with The Connells' sound. "Ever Want Me To" was the first single from the record and TVT Records had a video made of the song starring Huntley. The second single, "Catch Fire", was used in the Sandra Bullock/ Denis Leary film, Two If By Sea.

Doug MacMillan's side project is the band Mommie, which records lyrics and music written by MacMillan and his children. The most notable song is "Dumptruck", which has been played live by The Connells. Prior to that MacMillan was involved in a project called The Clifmen. This group, composed of musicians from various Raleigh independent bands, made one record.

Peele Wimberley played drums with various artists after his stint with The Connells including Parklife, Taylor Roberts, and Milagro Saints. After moving to Los Angeles Wimberley played keys and percussion in Lamps with John Crooke and David Burris, formerly of Jolene, Chris Phillips of Squirrel Nut Zippers, and Vicki Peterson of The Bangles. During his first few years in Los Angeles he wrote and cowrote incidental music for the show Last Comic Standing and for special products such as the DVD releases of the films Yes Man and Observe and Report. Peele has released an album under the name Silveradio which features his own songwriting and playing and is currently pursuing his electronic music interests with a project named Sleepie Digitz, as well as having played drums on upcoming releases by Apollo Heights and Ocean Carolina.

Mike graduated from the University of North Carolina Chapel Hill with a bachelor's degree in 1981, and received his Juris Doctor degree also from UNC Chapel Hill School of Law in 1985. He was admitted to the North Carolina Bar in 1986. Mike practices law at a firm in North Carolina, specializing in workers' compensation law.

David Connell is a successful painter in the Raleigh art community. His works have been on display in galleries in Raleigh, New York City, and elsewhere.

Steve Potak has played keyboards with numerous Raleigh bands, most notably the band Stream.

John Schultz's first film, Bandwagon, was based on experiences in the early days of The Connells' career. Doug MacMillan has acted in almost every John Schultz film. He played one of the main characters in Bandwagon where he was the Zen-like band manager, Linus Tate. MacMillan has also performed in several other Schultz films: he had the role of the science teacher in Drive Me Crazy, briefly played a valet in Like Mike, and had a role as a Health Inspector in the recent remake of The Honeymooners.

In 2002, the band recorded a cover of Cypress Hill's "Insane in the Brain" for Cevin Soling's When Pigs Fly.
