= Darker Days (Time Again album) =

Studio album by Time Again
- Released: February 19, 2008
- Studio: Tree Fort Studios (Los Angeles, CA)
- Genre: Punk rock; street punk
- Length: 32:03
- Label: Hellcat Records
- Producer: Mike Green

Time Again chronology
The Stories Are True (2006)	Darker Days (2008)	(Naked) (2009)

Professional ratings
Review scores
Source	Rating
AllMusic	3/5 stars

Darker Days is the second studio album by the American street punk band Time Again. It was recorded in Los Angeles, California and released on February 19, 2008 via Hellcat Records.

== Track listing ==
Tracklist adapted from iTunes

No.	Title	Length
1.	"Day Like This"	2:00
2.	"Soon It Will Be"	2:46
3.	"One Way or Another"	1:56
4.	"Lines Are Faded"	2:33
5.	"Darker Days"	2:34
6.	"Lucky"	2:06
7.	"Montreal (Street Kids)"	2:00
8.	"Lookin' Back"	3:08
9.	"Movin' On"	2:25
10.	"You're Goin' Down"	1:17
11.	"TV Static"	1:55
12.	"Shell Casings"	2:25
13.	"Gonna Get Mine"	2:12
14.	"Outcast"	2:45
Total length:		32:03

== Personnel ==
- Daniel Dart - vocals, cover art
- Elijah Reyes - guitar
- Oren Soffer - bass
- Ryan Purucker - drums
- Mike Green - mixing, producer
- Gene Grimaldi - mastering
