= Mike Connell (musician) =

American musician

- Born: Michael Collier Connell; 15 March 1959 (age 67); Georgia
- Genres: Rock, Jangle pop
- Occupations: Musician, singer, songwriter
- Member of: The Connells

Michael Collier Connell is an American musician best known as the leader, guitarist and primary songwriter of The Connells, an American band from Raleigh, North Carolina. They play a guitar-oriented, melodic jangle pop type of rock music with introspective lyrics that reflect themes and history of the American South.

== Origins ==
Mike and twin, John, were born on March 15, 1959. Mike's younger brother David, also a founding member of The Connells, was born on May 27, 1961.

== History ==
The Connell brothers moved around in their early years, as their father was in medical school and getting a degree in cancer research at Duke University. Mike was born in Georgia, and David was born in the Raleigh area, while their dad was working under a family practice physician. Later, the family ended up back in Macon, Georgia, where Mike Connell and his twin brother, John, graduated high school from First Presbyterian Day School in 1977. David, two years younger, graduated later from a different school in North Carolina.

In 1978, while attending Mercer University in Macon, Georgia, Mike Connell met fellow students Clark Eason and Wade Stooksberry (also a 1977 First Presbyterian Day School graduate). According to Stooksberry in an interview on March 6, 2008, in 1979 Eason, Connell, Stooksberry and Sammy Deet (drums) started playing publicly in a band called "Clark Eason and the Greaseguns" at nightclubs and parties in Macon. Connell and Eason were on guitar, and Eason and Stooksberry shared vocals. They wore suits and skinny ties tucked into their dress shirts, as was the style at the time. They performed mostly 1950s music and Beatles songs. After a year, Mike Connell transferred to a college in North Carolina. Tripp Crumbley took over Connell's guitar role in the band. Connell then occasionally made guest appearances with "Clark Eason and the Greaseguns" while visiting his father in Macon, until that band broke up in 1980.

Mike Connell graduated from the University of North Carolina Chapel Hill with a bachelor's degree in 1981, and received his Juris Doctor degree also from University of North Carolina School of Law in 1985. He was admitted to the North Carolina Bar in 1986. Mike now practices law (as does his twin brother, John) at a firm in North Carolina, specializing in workers' compensation law.

The Connell family moved to Raleigh, where their mother was from, just in time for David to go to Broughton High School for his senior year, and to graduate in 1979. Afterwards, David went at least one year to Mercer University, where they had family connections.

== The Connells ==
The Connells began to come together as a group in the spring of 1984. Mike was in his second year of law school and his brother David in his last semester of college, both at the University of North Carolina at Chapel Hill. The brothers, David playing bass and Mike on guitar, rented a practice space and began working up several of Mike's songs with a friend, John Schultz playing drums. John was a junior at UNC and was from Raleigh, where the Connell brothers' home base now was located. The band tried a few singers that spring before settling on Doug MacMillan, a childhood friend of Schultz's and a swimmer at East Carolina University. George Huntley, who was a childhood friend of both brothers Mike and David, became a member of the band in 1984; on second guitar, keyboards, and vocals.
