= TVT Records =

American record label

TVT
- Parent company: TVT (August 1984–2008); Sony/The Orchard (2008–present, recordings); Reservoir Media (2010–present, music publishing); Concord/Bicycle (2010–present, recordings acquired from TVT by Prudential Financial in 2002)
- Founded: August 1984
- Founder: Steve Gottlieb
- Status: Inactive
- Distributor: self-distributed
- Genre: Various
- Country of origin: U.S.
- Location: New York City, New York, U.S.

TVT Records, originally Tee-Vee Toons, was an American record label founded by Steve Gottlieb in 1984. Initially created to release the Television's Greatest Hits series of classic TV theme tune compilations, the label would expand into rap, industrial rock, and electronic music amassing 25 Gold, Platinum, and Multi-Platinum albums over the course of its 24-year history.

After losing a legal battle with Slip-N-Slide Records, TVT Records filed for bankruptcy in 2008 and the company's assets were acquired by The Orchard and Reservoir Media. Content that had previously been transferred to Prudential Financial was acquired by Bicycle Music Company in 2010.

The label's roster included Nine Inch Nails, Ja Rule, Lil Jon, Underworld, KMFDM, Gravity Kills, The KLF, The Baldwin Brothers, Sevendust, Nothingface, the Wellwater Conspiracy, The Brian Jonestown Massacre, The Holloways, The Cinematics, Buck-O-Nine, DJ Hurricane, Speech and Pitbull. The label had a triple platinum release with Nine Inch Nails' Pretty Hate Machine, two double platinum releases by Lil Jon, and platinum releases by Snoop Dogg and Tha Eastsidaz, Dashboard Confessional, Default and Ying Yang Twins, as well as gold releases by Sevendust, Gravity Kills, and The Black Crowes and Jimmy Page. Additionally, TVT achieved a gold release in Germany and Sweden with The Connells, and scored platinum and gold records in Canada with Default.

== History ==
=== Early years ===
TeeVee Toons was founded in August 1984 by Steve Gottlieb, a graduate of Yale University and Harvard Law. Gottlieb launched the label from his New York City apartment with the release of Television's Greatest Hits, an album featuring theme songs from classic TV shows that became a respectable seller. The San Francisco Chronicle called the album "the most fun you can have with your pants on", and the New York Times highlighted it as one of 1985's most notable business ideas.

In 1986, TeeVee Toons was shortened to TVT Records. In 1988, TVT signed industrial rock band Nine Inch Nails, and they released their debut studio album Pretty Hate Machine on October 20, 1989. But there was tension between Gottlieb and NIN frontman Trent Reznor throughout the promotion. According to Reznor, Gottlieb called Nine Inch Nails' record an "abortion". Gottlieb reportedly said to Reznor: "You fucked up what could have been a good career."

When Pretty Hate Machine sold 1,000,000 copies, Gottlieb allegedly reacted rudely, ordering the band to sell four million copies of the follow-up. While NIN was on tour, TVT released an EP for the single "Head Like a Hole" that contained a longer version than the one on the album. There were disputes between Reznor and TVT regarding financial compensation, and according to Reznor, TVT pressured him to make a follow-up record that sounded identical to Pretty Hate Machine. Worried that TVT would interfere with his creative control, Reznor secretly started recording, under various pseudonyms, what would become Broken in 1992. He met Jimmy Iovine, founder of Interscope Records. In 1992, Reznor and TVT reached an agreement where NIN would leave TVT and move to Interscope, but TVT would receive royalties from future NIN releases.

In 1996 Crain's named Gottlieb one of its Forty Under 40 Rising Stars to Watch, citing the 50% yearly growth of TVT. In 1999 TVT completed a securitization that enabled it to raise $23.5 million in growth capital.

=== Later years ===
In 2000, TVT became the first label to put its entire catalog online available for downloading and free streaming by fans. In 2001, the label reached an amicable arrangement with Napster for use of TVT's artist copyrights, and TVT's CEO joined the Napster advisory board. Gottlieb appeared before the Senate Judiciary Committee in 2001 on a panel that included Richard Parsons, then head of Time Warner; Ken Berry, head of EMI; and artists Alanis Morissette and Don Henley. CEO Gottlieb served on the Board of Directors of Musicmatch (sold to Yahoo!).

TVT was one of the founding members of the Association of Independent Music (A2IM), an organization devoted to protecting independent labels' interests.

In 2002, the label got into a dispute with Lyor Cohen, then head of Island Def Jam. The dispute involved Cohen and Universal paying former TVT artist Ja Rule $8 million to not deliver an album paid for by TVT, and instead deliver it to Universal. In the resulting litigation Universal was prohibited by the courts from releasing the album produced with TVT's funding. In the ultimate trial over the claims of fraud and tortious interference, a jury awarded TVT a $132 million judgment. Universal appealed the ruling. On appeal, Cohen and Universal argued the existence of an agreement between the parties meant that their behavior was only a breach of contract and not a fraud or tort. The court agreed, reducing TVT's award to $126,000.

In 2002, Prudential Financial acquired the rights to Pretty Hate Machine, The Connells, the "Mortal Kombat" soundtracks, the first seven volumes of Television's Greatest Hits, and a Wax Trax boxed set; certain publishing rights in compositions from KMFDM, Gil Scott-Heron and Nine Inch Nails, among others; and trademarks, including the Television's Greatest Hits logo, after TVT had defaulted on a loan to Prudential. In 2005, Prudential placed the catalogue up for sale.

==== Slip-N-Slide lawsuit/Bankruptcy ====
In 2007, TVT lost a $9 million lawsuit to Slip-N-Slide Records when a Florida judge ruled that Slip-N-Slide had legal rights to distribute an unreleased album it owned by rapper Pitbull that he recorded for Slip-N-Slide in 2001. TVT, who signed Pitbull several years later, had sought to notice third parties (such as record stores or digital download entities) that the distribution and sale of this album would violate TVT's exclusive right to create new music by the artist. The judge, however, ruled against TVT as Pitbull had made the recordings prior to signing with TVT, and awarded Slip-N-Slide the $9 million judgement as TVT had attempted to block the sale of the album. TVT filed for appeal but was unable to post the required bond, thus TVT filed for bankruptcy.

On February 19, 2008, Gottlieb stated "This is not the end of TVT." In June 2008, however, the digital music label The Orchard was declared the winning bidder by a New York bankruptcy court, paying $6.05 million. The Orchard gained control of TVT's artist contracts, catalogue recordings, and its distribution infrastructure, thus ending the TVT Records label imprint. The music publishing assets were transferred to TVT Music Enterprises, and later purchased by Reservoir Media. On April 6, 2010, The Bicycle Music Company acquired 700 master recordings across 80 albums, including the catalogues of Nine Inch Nails, The Connells and Television's Greatest Hits, from Prudential.

== See also ==
- List of former TVT Records artists
