= Ambrose (disambiguation) =

Ambrose (c. 340 – 4 April 397) was an archbishop of Milan.

Ambrose may also refer to:

== People ==
- Ambrose (surname)
- Ambrose (given name)
- Ambrose (bandleader), or Bert Ambrose (1896–1971), English band-leader and violinist
- Ambrose (Cantacuzène) (1947–2009), Russian-Swiss bishop of the Russian Orthodox Church outside Russia
- Ambrose of Alexandria (before 212–c. 250), friend of the Christian theologian Origen
- Ambrose of Siena (1220–1287), Italian Dominican teacher, missionary and diplomat

== Places ==
=== Communities ===
- Mount Ambrose, a suburb of Redruth in Cornwall, England
- Ambrose, Contra Costa County, California, US
- Ambrose, Georgia, US
- Ambrose, North Dakota, US
- Ambrose, Queensland, a town in Australia

=== Natural formations ===
- Ambrose Brook, New Jersey
- Ambrose Lake (Algoma District), Ontario
- Ambrose Lake (British Columbia)
- Ambrose Lake (Thunder Bay District), Ontario
- Ambrose Rocks, Antarctica

== Educational institutions ==
- Ambrose University, a private Christian liberal arts college in Calgary, Alberta, Canada
- Ambrose Alli University in Ekpoma, Edo State, Nigeria
- St Ambrose Barlow Roman Catholic High School, a Catholic technology college in Swinton, Greater Manchester, England, UK
- St Ambrose College, a Catholic boys' grammar school in Altrincham, Greater Manchester, England, UK
- The Ambrose School, a grade K-12 classical Christian school in Meridian, Idaho, US
- St. Ambrose University, Davenport, Iowa, US
- St. Ambrose Academy, a Catholic middle school and high school in Madison, Wisconsin, US
- Saint Ambrose Catholic School (disambiguation)

== Religion ==
- St. Ambrose Church (disambiguation)
- St. Ambrose Cathedral (disambiguation)

== Other ==
- Lightship Ambrose, multiple lightships stationed on the Ambrose Channel
- Ambrose Light or Ambrose Tower, a light station that replaced the lightships on the Ambrose Channel
- Ambrose Medal, an award for service to the Canadian earth science community
- Ambrose (golf), a team playing format
- Ambrose, Louisiana, a fictional town in House of Wax
- "Ambrose (Part 5)", a 1959 novelty song by Linda Laurie
- Ambrose Monk, a character from the TV show Monk

== See also ==
- Ambroise (disambiguation)
- Ambrosia (disambiguation)
- Ambrosius (disambiguation)
- Amvrosy
