= Samuel Juster =

American architect

- Born: February 12, 1896; Bucharest, Romania
- Died: May 1, 1982 (aged 86); Broward, Florida
- Occupation: Architect
- Spouse: Minnie Silberman (m. 1922)
- Children: 2, including Norton

Samuel Juster, AIA (12 February 1896 – 2 May 1982) was an American architect who practiced during the mid-20th century in New York City and New Jersey.

== Career ==
=== Early life and education ===
Juster was born in Bucharest, Romania. He earned a diploma from Cooper Union in 1917. He studied Beaux Arts, Corbett-Gugler, Atelier (345 East 33rd Street, Manhattan), between 1915 and 1917, and earned a diploma from the International Correspondence School in 1918. In 1956, his office was located at 36G Broadway, New York City.

=== Early career ===
While earning his diplomas, Juster was Squad Leader, draftsmen and writer for Goldner & Goldberg (Note: Goldner & Goldberg was the New York City architectural firm of Romanian-born Jacob "Jack" Goldner (1879–1968) and Abraham Goldberg (1873–1934)) from 1913 to 1917; he was a draftsman, writer, and supervisor at the firm of Alfred C. Bossom from 1918 to 1924 where he met Anthony J. DePace with whom, in 1923, he formed the partnership DePace & Juster, an architectural firm.

=== DePace and Juster (1923–1947) ===
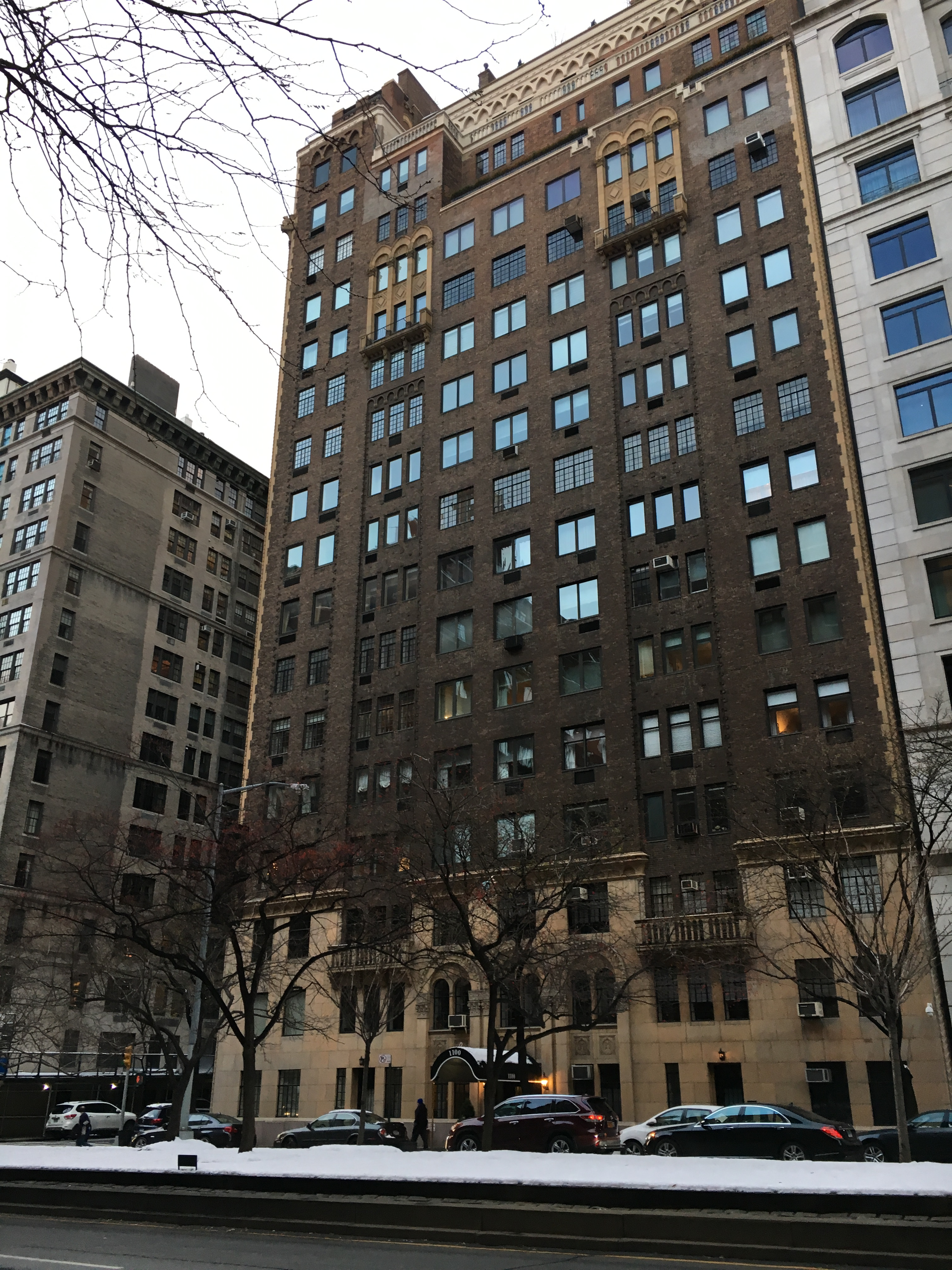
1100 Park Avenue, Carnegie Hill, Upper East Side, Manhattan

Anthony DePace left the firm of Cass Gilbert in 1923 and formed DePace and Juster with Juster. The firm continued in practice until 1947, when the partnership was dissolved. Juster claimed in 1956 that the practice was established in 1925 and disestablished in 1948.

==== Works ====
- 1928: The Eaves Costume Company building, 151 West 46th Street, Manhattan
- 1929–1931 St. Claire of Assisi Church, Bronx, NY (credited to DePace)
- 1930: 1100 Park Avenue, Manhattan, at the northwest corner of 89th Street in the Carnegie Hill neighborhood
- 1930: St. Teresa Church, Bronx, NY (credited to DePace, destroyed by fire)
- 1931: St. Roch's Church, Bronx, NY (credited to DePace)
- 1939: St. Vincent De Paul Church, New York City (façade (1939), church by Henry Engelbert (1857)
- 1948: Refrigerating Plant for the Hudson River State Hospital, Poughkeepsie
- 1951: Tubercular Hospital for the Hudson River State Hospital, Poughkeepsie

=== Samuel Juster, AIA (1948–present) ===
Juster established his own firm under his own name in 1948, a year after DePace had done the same, suggesting that DePace disbanded the partnership and Juster was slower to reestablish himself. As the junior partner of DePace & Juster, the multiple differences in the dates between the Juster and the DePace could be explained by DePace taking the initiative in their joint activities with Juster playing catch-up. Juster was registered as an architect in New York City and New Jersey.

==== Works ====
- 1951: Yeshivah of Flatbush (drawings courtesy Brooklyn Public Library)
- 1954: Shaare Torah Community Center, 305 East 21st Street, Brooklyn (as of the 1970s, the Salem Missionary Baptist Church)
- 1954: Traymore Hotel Outdoor and Indoor Swimming Pools (Atlantic City, New Jersey) (demolished 1972)
- 1958: Shaare Torah Synagogue, 305 East 21st Street, Brooklyn (as of the 1970s, the Salem Missionary Baptist Church)

== Awards, honors, and professional affiliations ==
- 1929 (issued 1930): Certificate & Gold Medal, Fifth Avenue Association, for De Salvo Antique Shop.
- Mention: Congregation Shaare Torah, Prospect Park Jewish Congregation, Masonic Lodge,
- New York Society of Architects, New York State Association of Architects, AIA Member: N.Y. Chapter.

== Legacy ==
Juster's former partner, DePace, had a prolific career as a designer of Roman Catholic buildings. Juster appears to have balanced out the firm's portfolios with non-Catholic commissions, including many Jewish commissions. Between the first (1956) and third (1970) editions of the American Architects Directory, he made no changes to his original entry, including prominent commissions. He did not file an entry in 1970 but, most of his 1956 commissions were as DePace & Juster.

== Family ==
On March 12, 1922, Juster married Minnie Silberman (1899–1991) in Brooklyn. They had two children, Howard Herbert Juster (1924–2001) and Norton Juster (1929-2021), both of whom became architects. One of his grandsons, Kenneth Ian Juster (born 1954), served as U.S. Ambassador to India from 2017 to 2021.

=== Home addresses ===
In 1956, Samuel Juster resided at 25 Lefferts Avenue, Brooklyn.

== See also ==
- Architecture of United States
