= Caselotti =

Caselotti is a surname. Notable people with the surname include:

- Adriana Caselotti (1916–1997), American actress, voice actress, and singer
- Louise Caselotti (1910–1999), American opera singer, sister of Adriana
