= St. Emery Church =

St. Emery Church or Saint Emeric's Church or variations honoring Saint Emeric of Hungary may refer to:

- St. Emery Church (Fairfield, Connecticut)
- St. Emeric's Church (New York City)
