= Guido Caselotti =

Italian-American music teacher and opera director (1884–1978)

- Born: Guido Luigi Emanuele Hocke; June 20, 1884; Udine, Kingdom of Italy
- Died: July 30, 1978 (aged 94); San Gabriel, California, U.S.
- Resting place: Forest Lawn Memorial Park, Glendale, California
- Education: New York German Conservatory
- Occupations: Music teacher; Vocal coach; Opera director
- Years active: 1900–1967
- Spouse(s): Maria Orefice (m. 1909; div. 1933) Anna Karp (m. 1935; death 1978)
- Children: Louise Caselotti (daughter); Adriana Caselotti (daughter)

Guido Luigi Emanuele Caselotti (born Guido Luigi Emanuele Hocke; June 20, 1884 – July 30, 1978) was an Italian-American opera director, vocal coach, and music teacher. A master of the traditional "Old Italian School" of singing, he is most widely recognized for his pivotal role in casting the lead voice for Walt Disney's Snow White and the Seven Dwarfs (1937), which launched the career of his daughter, Adriana Caselotti.

== Early life and education ==
Born in Udine, Italy, to Giovanni and Luigia (Caselotti) Hocke, he later professionally adopted his mother's maiden name. As a teenager in Rome, Caselotti was a performer in the world premiere of Giacomo Puccini's opera Tosca on January 14, 1900.

He immigrated to the United States in 1903 at age 18, arriving in New York aboard the ship Lomarida on April 25. He initially studied voice and piano at the New York German Conservatory before establishing himself as a teacher. Between 1908 and 1911, while serving as an organist in New Haven, Connecticut, he taught piano to a young Alfred Newman, who would become one of Hollywood's most decorated film composers.

== Career and vocal pedagogy ==
=== Early New York and Connecticut years ===
After completing his studies at the New York German Conservatory, Caselotti opened a private music school inside the prestigious Metropolitan Opera House building in New York City. During this early period, he registered for the World War I draft as a self-employed musician working from 1425 Broadway. He later relocated to Bridgeport, California, where he served as the organist and choir director for the Holy Rosary Church, integrating classical European repertoire into the parish's musical programming.

=== Relocation to Los Angeles and Hollywood Growth ===
In the summer of 1926, following a two-year working sabbatical in Italy, Caselotti moved his family to Los Angeles, California. The relocation aligned with the American cinema industry's turbulent transition from silent films to "talkies," which created an unprecedented demand for localized vocal coaching.

Known by the title "Maestro," Caselotti established a high-profile voice studio out of his residence at 1340 North Douglas Street in the Echo Park neighborhood. He was a strict practitioner of the classical Bel Canto technique, which he had studied under the legendary Italian baritone Antonio Cotogni. His curriculum emphasized natural breath placement (appoggio), vowel equalization, and the development of dramatic vocal ring (squillo) to help stage singers transition into radio and microphone performance.

=== The Disney Consultancy ===
In 1934, Walt Disney Studios casting representative Roy Scott contacted Caselotti to act as a talent consultant for the studio's first full-length animated feature film, Snow White and the Seven Dwarfs. Disney requested that Caselotti screen his active student roster to find a singer whose voice was "ageless, friendly, natural, and innocent". While Caselotti compiled potential candidates from his studio, his daughter Adriana overstrained a telephone extension line to pitch herself, ultimately securing the historic role under musical director Frank Churchill.

Following the global commercial success of the 1937 film, Caselotti heavily leveraged the achievement in industry trades. He prominently advertised his business as "The Teacher of the Voice of Snow White," a promotional strategy that reportedly generated upwards of 50 new student applications per week to his studio throughout the late 1930s.

=== Operatic Directorship and later career ===
During the 1940s, Caselotti assumed the role of General Director for the San Gabriel Opera Company in California. Operating out of the historic San Gabriel Mission Playhouse, he staged full-scale classical opera productions intended to bring accessible high art to local audiences while providing an orchestra-backed platform for West Coast vocalists. He frequently cast his elder daughter, Louise, as the dramatic lead in these productions.

Following World War II, Caselotti relocated his studio operations to San Gabriel and Alhambra. He remained an active force in the Southern California vocal community until 1960, when he briefly paused his practice for a two-year residency in Locarno, Switzerland. Upon returning to California, he resumed limited vocal instruction until his formal retirement in 1967, concluding a teaching career that spanned more than six decades.

Throughout his multi-decade career across New York and Los Angeles, Caselotti trained a diverse array of students spanning the fields of classical opera, Hollywood film scoring, radio, and theatre. Alfred Newman the future Oscar-winning film composer studied piano under Caselotti early in his childhood development. His younger daughter Adriana Caselotti, who trained extensively in his vocal studio before winning the titular voice role in Walt Disney's Snow White and the Seven Dwarfs (1937). His elder daughter Louise Caselotti, a celebrated operatic contralto who later became a highly regarded vocal coach herself, notably mentoring the legendary soprano Maria Callas.

Miyoshi Sugimachi a prominent Japanese-American lyric soprano who studied with Caselotti in Los Angeles following her formal training in Italy. She earned widespread acclaim for her performances as Cio-Cio-San in Madama Butterfly and her 1933 performance in Sakura at the Hollywood Bowl. George Stinson a Los Angeles police officer widely known as Hollywood's "Singing Cop". Under Caselotti's vocal training, Stinson developed a powerful operatic tenor voice that led to successful professional concert and radio engagements. Cathy Rae Clark an American singer and stage actress who sought vocal coaching from Caselotti to refine her technique for musical theatre and Broadway performances.

== Personal life ==
Caselotti was married twice. His first marriage was to Maria Orefice, an operatic coloratura soprano from the Royal Opera Theatre of Rome, whom he married on October 14, 1909. The union produced two daughters, Louise and Adriana, before ending in divorce in March 1933. In August 1935, he married Anna Karp, a pianist who assisted as an accompanist in his vocal training studio.

== Death ==
Caselotti passed away in San Gabriel, California, at the age of 94. He is buried under his professional title, "Maestro Guido Caselotti," at Forest Lawn Memorial Park in Glendale.

== See also ==
- Bel canto
- Antonio Cotogni
- Cinema of the United States
