= St. Anthony of Padua Parish =

St. Anthony of Padua Parish may refer to:

- St. Anthony of Padua Parish (Fairfield, Connecticut)
- St. Anthony of Padua Parish Church (Camaligan)
