= St. Dominic's Church (Bronx) =

Church building in New York, US

Coordinates: 40°50′39.4″N 73°52′4″W

The Church of St. Dominic
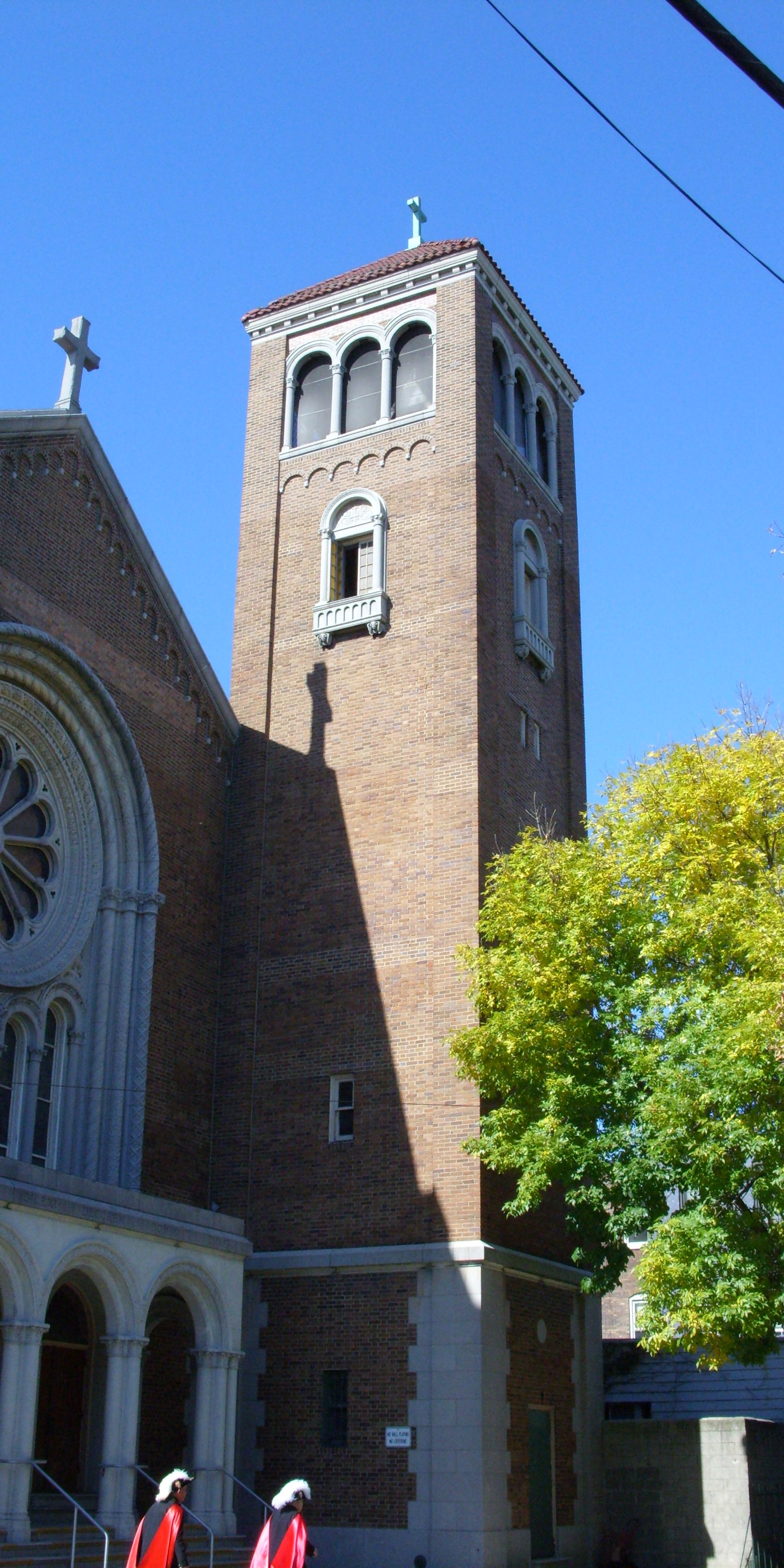
- St. Dominic's Church in Van Nest

General information
- Architectural style: Romanesque Revival
- Location: Van Nest, Bronx, New York City, United States of America
- Construction started: May 31, 1925
- Client: Roman Catholic Archdiocese of New York

Technical details
- Structural system: Brick masonry

Design and construction
- Architect: Anthony J. DePace of the firm DePace & Juster

The Church of St. Dominic is a Roman Catholic parish church under the authority of the Roman Catholic Archdiocese of New York, located at 1739 Unionport Road, Van Nest, Bronx, New York City.

== History ==
The parish was established in 1927. The Romanesque Revival was built 1925 to the designs of Bronx-native architect Anthony J. DePace of the firm DePace & Juster.

In 2007 the administration of the parishes of Our Lady of Solace Church (Bronx) and St. Dominic's merged forming a single parish with two churches.

In May 2011, two of the three bells were removed in order to service the wooden supports which were waterlogged and had seepage problems. The goal is to replace the wooden supports and return the bells to their original location. The expected restoration cost of the bells is estimated at $30,000.

The former convent was renovated to become the parish's Faith Formation Center.

In keeping with tradition, the Morris Park Community Association hosted a breakfast at St. Dominic’s on Sunday, October 7, 2018 prior to the start of that year’s Bronx Columbus Day Parade.

== School ==
The parish school was among 27 slated to be closed by Archbishop Dolan in the Archdiocese of New York as announced on 11 January 2011. The school, after 59 years was closed at the end of June 2011 resulting in its student body having to transfer to other local Catholic schools.

== See also ==
- Our Lady of Solace Church (Bronx)
