= Maria Orefice =

Italian-American coloratura soprano and vocal teacher (1893–1961)

- Born: Maria Josephine Orefice; July 16, 1893; Casavatore, Naples, Italy
- Died: June 22, 1961 (aged 67) Hollywood, California, U.S.
- Genres: Coloratura soprano
- Occupations: Opera Singer; Vocal coach; Actress
- Years active: 1907–1961
- Spouse: Guido Caselotti (m. 1909; div. 1933)
- Children: Louise Caselotti (daughter); Adriana Caselotti (daughter)

Maria Josephine Orefice (July 16, 1893 – June 22, 1961), also known by her married name Maria Caselotti, was a celebrated Italian-American coloratura soprano and vocal pedagogue. She gained international acclaim as a prima donna at the Royal Opera House in Rome before establishing a prominent 35-year teaching career in Hollywood. She is perhaps best known as the mother and vocal influence of Adriana Caselotti, the voice of Walt Disney's Snow White.

== Early life and family ==
Maria Josephine Orefice was born on July 16, 1893, in Casavatore, Naples, Italy, to Luigi Francesco Orefice (later Odrich) and Maria C. Pazella. She grew up in Naples until the age of ten, when her family immigrated to the United States around 1904.

The family settled in Bridgeport, Connecticut, where a linguistic misunderstanding led to a lasting name change; her teachers consistently mispronounced "Orefice" as "Odrich," a surname the family eventually adopted. Maria was one of four siblings, including brothers Frank and Vincent, and a sister, Anna, who became a lifelong educator at Waltersville School in Bridgeport.

== Career ==
=== Operatic success ===
Maria's vocal talents were first recognized by Guido Caselotti, the organist at Holy Rosary Church in Bridgeport, who became her teacher and later her husband. Under the professional name Maria Caselotti, she achieved significant success in Europe and the Americas as a lyric and coloratura soprano.

Her most prestigious affiliation was as a prima donna at the Royal Opera House of Rome (Teatro dell'Opera di Roma). Critics of the era lauded her as a "genuine artist of special grace," particularly noting her performances in technically demanding roles such as: Rosina in The Barber of Seville, Mimì in La Bohème, and Marguerite in Faust. In addition to her work in Rome, she performed with the Havana Opera Company, the San Carlo Opera Company, and the Di Feo Opera Company.

=== Pedagogy in Hollywood ===
Despite her "phenomenal success" in Italy, Maria chose to stop performing publicly upon her final return to the United States in 1926. Settling in Los Angeles, she and her husband opened a vocal studio. Following her divorce in 1933, she established her own independent studio in Hollywood, where she taught voice for over 35 years.

Her teaching lineage is notable; her elder daughter, Louise Caselotti, became a professional opera singer and the first teacher of the legendary Maria Callas. Her younger daughter, Adriana Caselotti, famously won the role of Snow White by imitating her mother's operatic technique.

== Personal life ==
Maria married Guido Luigi Emanuele Hocke-Caselotti on October 14, 1909, in Bridgeport. They had two daughters: Marie Louisa (born 1910) and Adriana Loretta (born 1917).

In March 1933, Maria filed for divorce from Guido, citing his "indifference". By 1934, she was living independently in a Hollywood Heights home on Alta Loma Terrace, valued at $10,000, where she resided with Adriana during the production of Snow White and the Seven Dwarfs.

== Death ==
Maria Caselotti died on June 22, 1961, at the age of 67, following a lengthy illness. She is buried in Los Angeles, and her legacy continues through the recordings of her daughters and the students she trained over her three-decade teaching career.
