= Hudson River State Hospital =

- Hudson River State Hospital; Main Building
- U.S. National Register of Historic Places
- U.S. National Historic Landmark
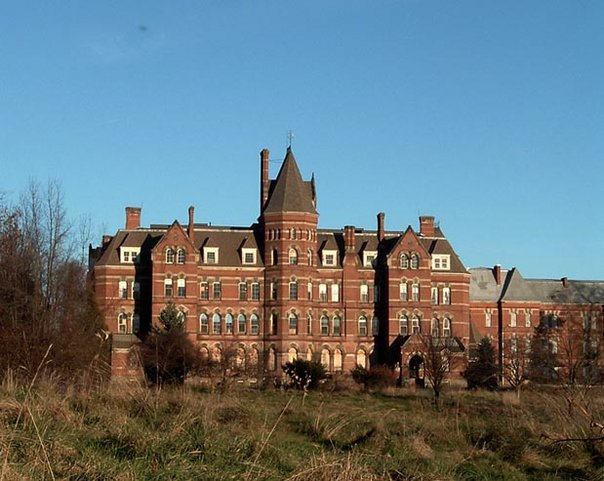
- Hospital in 2012
- Location: Town of Poughkeepsie, NY
- Nearest city: Poughkeepsie
- Coordinates: 41°43′59″N 73°55′42″W
- Area: 296 acres (120 ha)
- Built: 1868–1871
- Architects: Frederick Clarke Withers (construction); Calvert Vaux and Frederick Law Olmsted (landscape)
- Architectural style: High Victorian Gothic
- NRHP reference No.: 89001166

Significant dates
- Added to NRHP: June 29, 1989
- Designated NHL: June 30, 1989

The Hudson River State Hospital was a New York state psychiatric hospital that operated from 1873 until its closure in the early 2000s. The campus is notable for its main building, known as a "Kirkbride", which has been designated a National Historic Landmark due to its exemplary High Victorian Gothic architecture, the first use of that style for an American institutional building. It is located on US 9 on the Poughkeepsie-Hyde Park town line.

Frederick Clarke Withers designed the hospital's buildings in 1867. Calvert Vaux and Frederick Law Olmsted designed the grounds. It was intended to be completed quickly, but went far over its original schedule and budget. The hospital opened on October 18, 1871, as the Hudson River State Hospital for the Insane and admitted its first 40 patients. Construction, however, was far from over and would continue for another 25 years. A century later, it was slowly closed down as psychiatric treatment had changed enough that large hospitals were no longer needed, and its services had been served by the nearby Hudson River Psychiatric Center until that facility's closure in January 2012.

The campus was closed and abandoned in 2003 and fell into a state of disrepair. The male bedding ward, south of the main building, was critically damaged in a 2007 fire caused by lightning. Authorities struggled with the risk of arson and vandals, with the Fairview Fire District responding to 11 such incidents between 2011 and 2019.

The property was sold to an unnamed buyer in November 2013. The site is currently being developed as a $300 million mixed-use project called Hudson Heritage, which will include 750 residential units, commercial space, medical office space, a hotel, and a conference center.

== Buildings ==
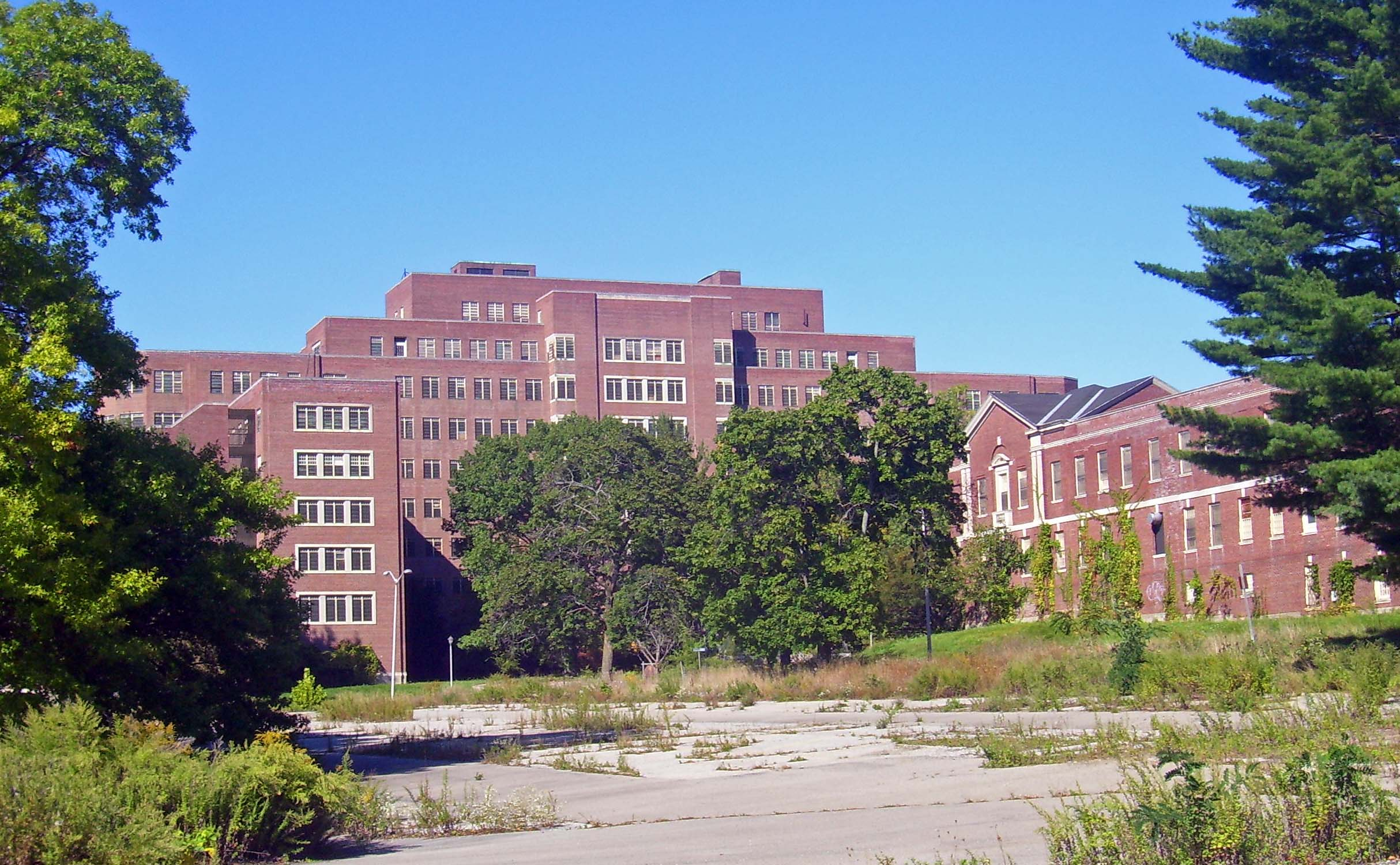
The Cheney Building as visible from a nearby strip mall, with Ryon Hall to the right

The Hospital includes a number of unique buildings:

- Main Building (the Kirkbride), a High Victorian Gothic building used for administrative purposes. This building was being rehabilitated for reuse when it was destroyed in a substantial fire on June 3, 2026.
- Patient Wings, which split off the Kirkbride, housed patients. The male ward splits off to the south, and is much larger than the female wing to the north. It was struck by lightning on May 31, 2007, igniting a serious fire. The female ward to the north burned down in June 2026.
- Presbyterian and Roman Catholic churches were available to patients, one of which was near the male ward.
- A morgue, with refrigerated cold chambers was located on the northeast corner of the property.
- A power house was built, and still stands, to the northeast of the Kirkbride to provide power to the various buildings. Its smokestack is visible from Route 9 as well as nearby Marist College. This building will be demolished sometime in the future.
- Ryon Hall opened in 1934 and housed violent or criminally insane patients. It was on the very southern property line, visible from Home Depot, in the shadow of the much larger Cheney Building. The building was demolished on October 14, 2019.
- The Clarence O. Cheney Building, opened in 1952, is a ten-story steel structure with a brick facade. Named after Dr. Clarence O. Cheney, MD (1887–1947), the president of the American Psychiatric Association from 1935 to 1936, and hospital's superintendent from the 1920s until 1946, the building held doctor's offices and medical examination rooms. The building did provide some patient housing. This building was demolished in 2020.
- The Herman B. Snow Rehabilitation Center opened in 1971 and provided recreational relief for patients, sporting two bowling alley lanes, a lunch counter, an auditorium, a basketball court, and an indoor swimming pool. The building featured a modern concrete and glass construction with angular asymmetrical wings. Skylights provided natural lighting. This building was demolished in 2019.

== History ==
The entire facility was built over the last three decades of the 19th century, at great cost. Once complete, it would be used as intended for much of the first half of the next century. As psychiatry moved away from inpatient treatments, it began to decline in use until its closure at century's end. Today, most of the structures have given way to a shopping plaza, which opened in 2021.

=== 19th century ===
New York had opened what has since become Utica Psychiatric Center in 1843, the first state-run institution for the mentally ill. By the Civil War it was reaching its capacity, so in 1866 then Governor Reuben Fenton appointed a five-member state commission to look for a site for a second hospital in the Hudson Valley between New York City and Albany, to serve New York City and the counties of Eastern New York. In January of the following year the members reported to the governor that they had temporarily secured a 296-acre (120 ha) tract of land overlooking the Hudson River north of Poughkeepsie, formerly part of the estates of James Roosevelt and William A. Davis. It would cost nothing as the citizens of Dutchess County would be offering it to the state as a gift. Two months later, the state accepted.

A nine-member Board of Managers was created and appointed to initiate and oversee construction of the actual building. They chose architect Frederick Clarke Withers to design a building according to the Kirkbride Plan, then a popular theory for the design of mental institutions. Withers planned a building 1,500 feet (457 m) in length and over 500,000 square feet (45,000 m^{2}) in area, most of it two wings that would house patients. It was the first institutional building in the U.S. designed in the High Victorian Gothic style. Calvert Vaux and Frederick Law Olmsted, designers of New York's Central Park, laid out the surrounding landscape. Like Withers, they had been influenced by landscape gardener Andrew Jackson Downing in nearby Newburgh.

The centerpiece of his design was the administration building, which branched off into two wings, composed of six parallel pavilions that flanked the central structure. The two wings, designed to hold 300 patients of either sex, were divided by a chapel placed between them in the yard behind the administration building so that patients could not see into the rooms of the opposite sex. The building and landscape plan were meant to aid in patients' recovery, by giving them adequate space and privacy and imbuing their healing with a sense of grandeur.

Construction began in 1868, with the cost estimated at $800,000. Cost-saving measures included the construction of a new dock on the Hudson so that building materials could be shipped more directly to the site, quarrying and cutting the foundation stones on site, mixing concrete from local materials and hiring local craftsmen instead of a general contractor. The board also deviated from the plan it had sent the state, in particular by building a shorter female wing when it came to believe that fewer patients of that sex would be admitted. As a result, it is one of the few Kirkbride hospitals to have been built with asymmetrical wings.

==== Spending controversies and delays ====
Despite the efforts to save money, the board was slightly over the $100,000 it had expected to spend that year, according to its first annual report. The main building was completed and opened, with 40 patients admitted, in October 1871. As work continued on other structures planned for the complex, so did the cost overruns. In 1873, the year county residents had been promised the hospital would be finished, the New York Times ran an editorial harshly criticizing the board for not only having gone way over budget but for lavish extravagance and waste:

The managers have entirely disregarded the law by which they were authorized to act. They have altered the plans and specifications ... Some of the details of the extravagance of the board are amazing. For instance, the first part of the work undertaken was the construction of a reservoir, into which the water was pumped from the river through an eight-inch (20 cm) iron pipe; from the reservoir the water was carried to the hospital by a twelve-inch (30 cm) iron pipe, the engine and machinery employed being on the scale of those used in supplying a neighboring city of 20,000 inhabitants. The cost of the reservoir was $100,000. Thirty thousand dollars was expended in blasting some rough rocks jutting into the reservoir, and the Superintendent gave as a reason for this that, if some of the patients were missing, they might want to rake the bottom of the reservoir to find the bodies, and with this the rocks would interfere ... The floors are laid in yellow Southern pine, the most expensive of the flooring, fitted and cut in a way greatly to enhance the cost. The heating is arranged on a scale that, with only 150 patients, ten tons (9 tonnes) of coal per day is consumed. The mention of these items sufficiently explains the disappearance of $1,200,000 of the people's money.

Some efforts were made to stop the project, but the legislature continued to appropriate funds despite further revelations like these. Construction continued until 1895, when further money could not be found. Despite this expenditure of time and money, the hospital's original plan was still not complete, and never would be.

=== 20th century ===
A Refrigerating Plant was built 1948 and a Tubercular Hospital was built in 1951 to the designs of Samuel Juster of DePace & Juster. Buildings continued to be opened and reopened in the 20th century, and as late as 1952 the institution was treating as many as 6,000 patients.

Changes in the treatment of mental illness, such as psychotherapy and psychotropic drugs, were making large-scale facilities relics and allowing more patients to lead more normal lives without being committed. A major fire destroyed a hospital wing in the 1960s and threatened to spread to the administration building, but was halted in a connecting hallway. The section was rebuilt, although some large roof beams still showed evidence of the earlier fire. Though 1971 saw the addition of the Snow Recreational center, by the late 1970s the hospital administration had decided to shut down the two main wings as few patients were residing in them and due to neglect some of the floors had collapsed. The hospital housed 1,780 patients by 1976. The state offices of Mental Health and Historic Preservation clashed over a plan to demolish the wings, even after the National Historic Landmark designation in 1989.

In the 1990s, more and more of the hospital site would be abandoned as its services were needed less and less. It was consolidated with another Dutchess County mental hospital, Hudson River Psychiatric Center, in 1994 and closed in 2003. The center moved operations into a much smaller building nearby, Ross Pavilion, located on a hilltop on the east side of Rt 9G.

=== 21st century ===
==== 2000s ====
In 2005, the state sold the property and subsequently, the Empire State Development Corporation sold 156 acres (63 ha) including the Main Building to Hudson Heritage LLC, a subsidiary of the Chazen Companies, for $2.75 million. Hudson Heritage and Chazen had planned to thoroughly renovate the Main Building into a combination hotel/apartment complex as the centerpiece of a residential/commercial campus, Hudson Heritage Park.

May 2007 fire at the Main Building

Redevelopment plans hit two setbacks in the mid- to late-2000s: in 2005, the Town of Poughkeepsie imposed a moratorium on new construction to cope with its growth. Hudson Heritage had been seeking to have a "historic revitalization district" created for the property that would help spur its growth.

Then, on May 31, 2007, lightning struck the south wing, which held male housing, causing one of the most serious fires in Dutchess County's history.

The property has remained closed to the public, with signs posted at fenced-off entrances. Local firefighters have complained, after dealing with two fires in April 2010 that appeared to be deliberately set, that the property is not adequately secured against trespassing.

==== 2010s ====
As of May 2012, the campus was owned by CPC Resources, a subsidiary of the New York City-based Community Preservation Corporation, a non-profit mortgage lender that finances multifamily developments. CPC has placed the 162-acre parcel on the market, citing that the poor economy has hindered timely development.

An unnamed buyer purchased the campus for an undisclosed sum in November 2013. The closing for the property occurred on November 8, 2013. The site is currently being developed as a $300 million mixed-use project called Hudson Heritage, which will include 750 residential units, commercial space, medical office space, a hotel, and a conference center.

== Fires ==
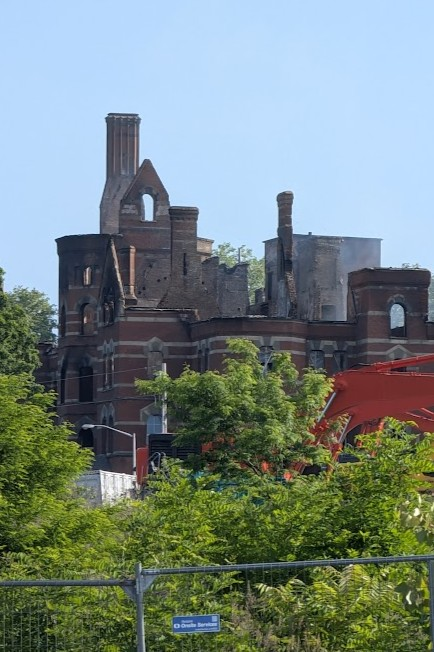
Ruins of the Kirkbride-style building after the June 2026 fire

Numerous arsons occurred on the property during its decades of disuse. A fire that broke out in May 2017 was determined to be arson.

Another arson occurred on the morning of April 27, 2018, according to Fairview Fire District Chief. The fire was located in the wing of the old Main Administration building, and firefighters were dispatched around 3:45 AM; more than a dozen agencies responded with assistance. The fire spread to the administration building, seriously damaging its roof.

On June 3, 2026, a substantial fire destroyed several buildings on campus. The fire spread to the main Kirkbride administration building, destroying its floors, roof, and windows. Several weeks after the main fire, smaller fires continued to break out, including a second major fire on June 8.

== Demolition ==
Demolition began on July 13, 2016, when smaller auxiliary buildings were torn down. The heavy vegetation that mostly hid the property from plain sight was cleared in summer 2019.

Several larger buildings were demolished in the latter half of 2019. The demolition of Ryon Hall, on the extreme southern end of the property, began on October 14, 2019, and the Cheney building was removed by 2020.

As part of the mixed use site, the "Kirkbride" main administration building was intended to be reused, in addition to the library, amusement hall, chapel, the northernmost tower of the north wing, and The Great Lawn. The 2026 fire destroyed the interior of the Kirkbride structure. Local preservationists have expressed hope that the buildings could still be redeveloped.
