= St. Anthony of Padua Parish (Fairfield, Connecticut) =

Coordinates: 41°08′17.7″N 73°16′4.5″W

- St. Anthony of Padua Parish
- Location: 149 South Pine Creek Road; Fairfield, Connecticut
- Country: United States
- Denomination: Roman Catholic
- Website: Parish website

History
- Founded: 1927
- Founder: Polish immigrants
- Dedication: St. Anthony of Padua

Administration
- Province: Hartford
- Diocese: Bridgeport

Clergy
- Bishop: Most Rev. William E. Lori
- Pastor: Ms. Eleanor W. Sauers Ph.D. (Parish Life Coordinator)

St. Anthony of Padua Parish is a parish of the Roman Catholic Church in Fairfield, Connecticut, United States, in the Diocese of Bridgeport.

The parish was established in 1927 as a national parish for Polish immigrants, one of a number of Polish-American Roman Catholic parishes in New England, and staffed by Conventual Franciscans. It was one of several ethnic congregations in Fairfield, others including St. Emery's, serving the Hungarian populace, and Holy Cross, the only Slovene church in New England.

A new parish church designed by Anthony J. DePace of New York was built in 1970, but as demographics shifted, the parish lost parishioners as well as much of its Polish identity; its parochial school closed in 1973.

Fr. John Baran arrived as pastor in 2002 from crosstown Our Lady of the Assumption Church. He ended a number of traditionalist practices and services, and set about improving the parish's outreach and community activity. As an homage to the Polish heritage, however, the parish picnic, held annually since 1978, does feature traditional Polish foods such as pierogies and stuffed cabbage.

In December 2018, Bishop Frank Caggiano appointed Eleanor W. Sauers as Parish Life Coordinator, the first time a lay person had been appointed to head church administration in the diocese. Sauers had previously served as director of religious education, and had written her 2007 Ph.D. dissertation on the transformation of the parish.
