= St. Brigid Roman Catholic Church (Manhattan) =

Catholic parish in New York City

St Brigid's Roman Catholic Church
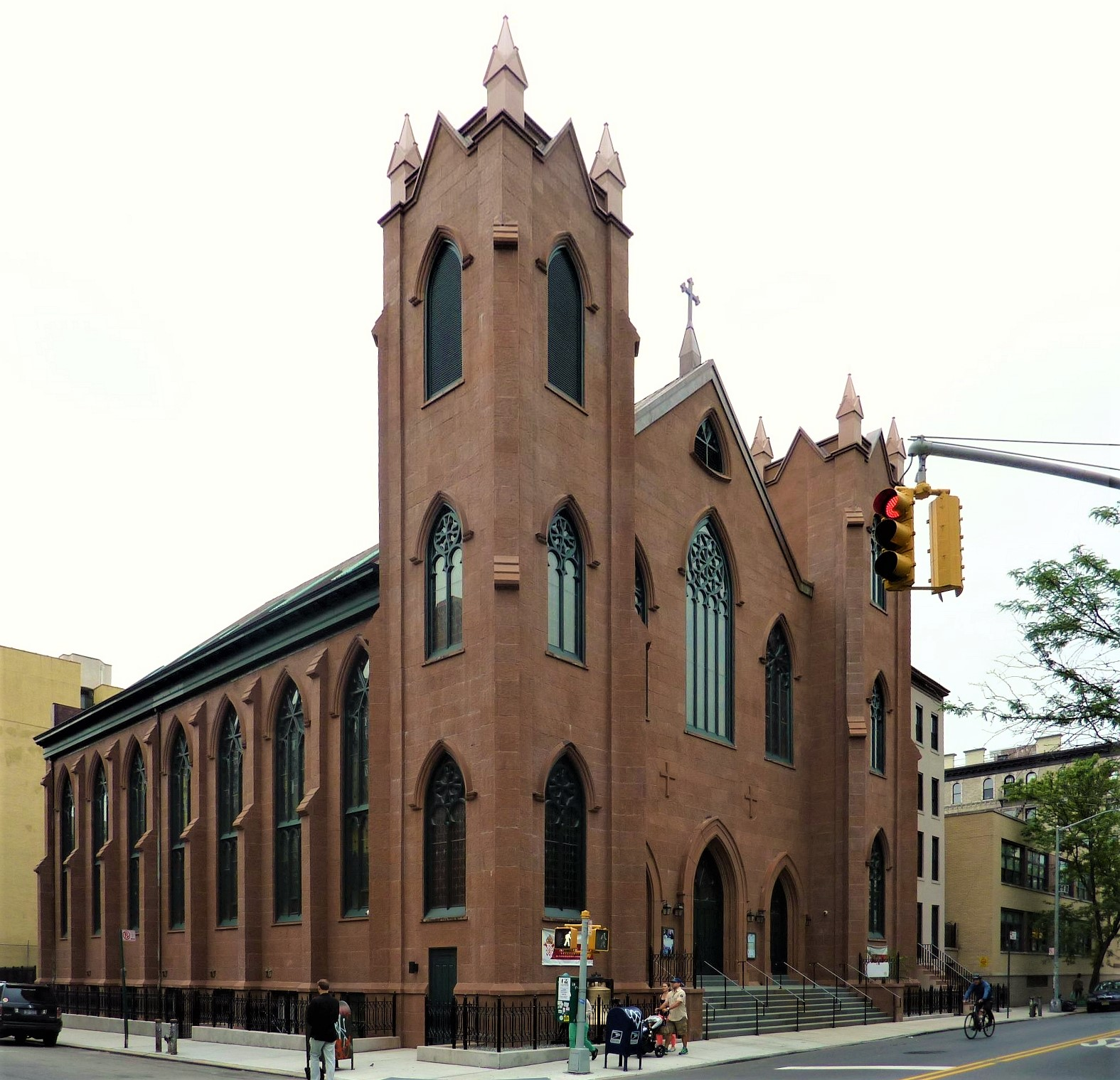
- (2013)
- St Brigid's Roman Catholic Church
- 40°43′31.5″N 73°58′50.5″W
- Location: 123 Avenue B, Manhattan, New York City
- Country: United States
- Denomination: Catholic Church
- Tradition: Latin Church

History
- Status: Church
- Dedication: St Brigid
- Earlier dedication: May 25, 1879
- Consecrated: January 27, 2013

Architecture
- Functional status: Active
- Architect: Patrick Keely
- Architectural type: Carpenter Gothic
- Style: Decorated Neo-Gothic

Specifications
- Materials: stone

Administration
- Archdiocese: Archdiocese of New York

Clergy
- Archbishop: Cardinal Timothy Michael Dolan
- Pastor: Rev. Seán Connolly

St. Brigid's Roman Catholic Church, also known as St. Brigid's or Famine Church, is a church located at 123 Avenue B, on the southeast corner of East 8th Street, along the eastern edge of Tompkins Square Park in the Alphabet City section of the East Village of Manhattan, New York City. Associated with the church is a parish school, Saint Brigid School, consisting of grades Pre-K through 8, which has been in existence since 1856.

Saint Brigid's Church was founded in 1848. In 2013, St. Emeric Church on Avenue D was closed and the parish merged with St. Brigid. It is now called St. Brigid-St. Emeric Church.

== History ==
The parish was organized in 1847 by Rev. Richard Kein, pastor of the Church of the Nativity. Construction began in 1848 by Irish shipwrights for those fleeing the Great Irish Famine (1845–1849). The architect of the church was Patrick Keely, who handcarved the gothic reredos himself. It was built by Irish boatwrights from the East River boatyards. The church was dedicated by Bishop John Hughes on December 2, 1849. Kein resigned the pastorate in 1852 due to poor health and was briefly succeeded by Thomas Martin O.P. Rev. Thomas J. Mooney was appointed pastor in 1853. "In its early years, St. Brigid’s served as a haven for Irish immigrants fleeing the famine, and later as a stalwart presence for the ever-changing immigrant populations to the neighborhood, from the Polish and Germans, to Ukrainians and Puerto Ricans."

=== Fr. Mooney and "the Fighting 69th" ===
The second pastor of the church, the Reverend Thomas Mooney, also served as chaplain to the nearby 69th New York State Militia. Upon its formation in 1851 it was called the 2nd Regiment of Irish Volunteers, a citizen-militia made up of Irish-Catholic diaspora from the Great Irish Famine. Father Mooney travelled with the 69th to Virginia and was beloved by the men for his spirit and sagacious counsel. Fr. Mooney held daily Masses for the regiment and served as confessor for the largely Catholic regiment. The regimental choir was headed by Capt. Maxwell O'Sullivan, formerly the choirmaster at St. Brigid's church. Mooney was lauded for his establishment of a temperance society and for encouraging many wayward souls to return to the Faith.

Father Mooney was recalled by New York Archbishop John "Dagger" Hughes in response to Mooney's baptism of a 64 lb. Columbiad cannon. Archbishop Hughes later suggested that Mooney was recalled after climbing the flagstaff of Fort Corcoran. Mooney was in the process of straightening an American flag that became stuck during a flag raising ceremony. Mooney's return was much bemoaned by the men of the regiment, but Mooney was warmly welcomed on his return to the city by 4,000 parishioners assembled in Tompkins Square.

During the New York City draft riots of July 1863, Mooney organized a neighborhood group to counter the federal troops sent to New York. When the 69th returned to New York following the Bull Run Campaign, Mooney marched at the head of the regiment. On August 14, 1861 a Requiem Mass was held for the men of the 69th NYSM who had been killed in action. The St. Brigid's choir sang Mozart's Requiem during the service. Fr. Mooney was conspicuously present at all future Irish Brigade functions and was much beloved by the men who survived to remember him.

A special feature of the New York Times in 1901, mentioned the church among other Catholic structures on the Lower East Side of Manhattan, describing the group "for the most part ... limit[ing] themselves to the functions of a parish church, in districts where social needs are otherwise supplied." The article clarified that the upper church was Irish and the basement used by Italians. In addition, the Sisters of Charity had a convent next door to the church, and there was an attached parochial school.

As the Irish population on the East Side declined, St. Brigid’s served newer immigrant populations, such as Slavs and especially Italians during the late 19th century and, from the 1950s onward, the growing Latino community.

=== Fr. Kuhn and the Tompkins Square riot ===
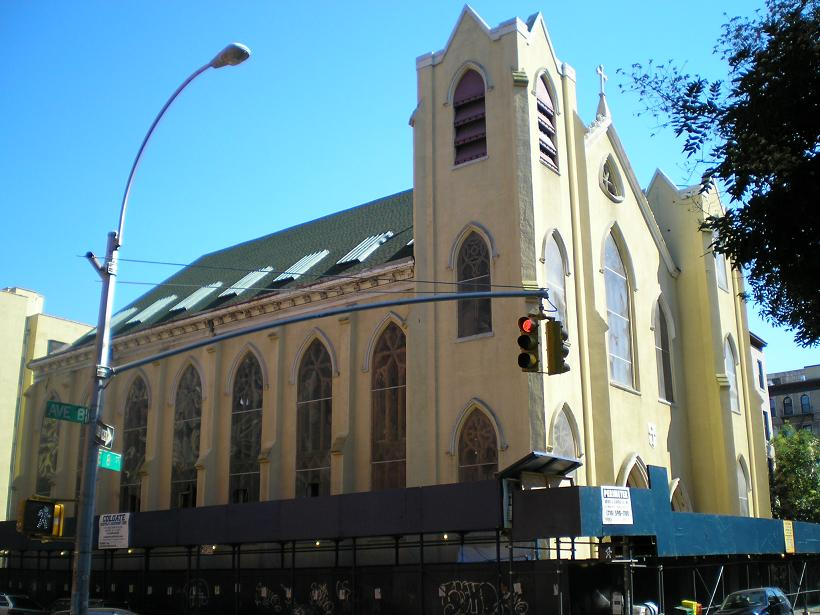
From Avenue B

During the 1988 Tompkins Square Park Riot, the church allowed homeless advocates and protesters of the police action to mobilize under its roof. A year later, when a shantytown in the park was dismantled, church pastor Rev. George Kuhn led a group of parishioners taking food to protesters and homeless people holed up in an abandoned school on East 4th Street. Father Kuhn was arrested when he defied orders not to cross a police line to deliver the food, saying, "I'm working under orders, too. The order I have is to feed the hungry, and that comes from a higher authority." St. Brigid's Church served as a place for protesters to organize and receive medical attention during the riot.

=== Closure and partial demolition ===
The church's main building closed in 2001 because of a crack in the building. The rear wall of the building had begun to pull away from the rest of the structure and the floor joists had separated several inches from the back wall. Mass was then held in the adjoining school while the parishioners rallied to raise money to save the church.

In September 2003, the Archdiocese of New York filed with the city an application to convert the church into apartments, but an archdiocese spokesperson said was only protecting its options. In September 2004 the Archdiocese officially closed the church when the Trinitarian Order left. In 2006 demolition commenced, Archdiocesan spokesman Joe Zwilling stating: "It's a hazard. It could have literally fallen over at any point in time." At that time, the spokesperson further stated that the property would not be turned into condominiums or apartments, (as nearby St. Ann's Church had been when it was converted into a dormitory for New York University). Zwilling said the church had no interest in selling the property. "It will be used for some other form of ministry, whether for educational or charitable or healthcare purposes, possibly senior housing," said a spokesperson for the archdiocese. Some criticized the Archdiocese for what New York Times columnist Dan Barry called its "tone-deaf" handling of parishioner and community concern.

"Save St. Brigid" rally on August 24, 2006; later that day a judge stayed demolition of the historic church

Earlier in 2006, Manhattan Supreme Court Justice Barbara Kapnick ruled against the Committee to Save St. Brigid's (CSSB) and allowed plans for demolition to proceed. In June, the New York Supreme Court, Appellate Division upheld that decision, Then in August Kapnick agreed to hear a separate suit in which the CSSB asserted that ownership and right to demolish are invalid due to the lack of a five-person board of trustees (including two parishioners) governing the church as required by New York law. The archdiocese said it convened such a board, in a meeting on July 18, where it agreed on demolition. The archdiocese also pointed out that the city did not question the church's ownership when they filed the building permits for demolition.

On July 26, 2006, Judge Barbara Kapnick declined to halt demolition plans, but asked lawyers on both sides to appear in her courtroom to hear arguments on the building's ownership. Before those arguments were to take place, a demolition crew arrived. The destruction amounted to a hole in the rear wall, damage to the interior, and damage to at least one of the stained glass windows, the window depicting Jesus’ life which bore the names of victims of the Great Irish Famine and benefactors of the church. The following day workers wielding crowbars knocked out the stained glass windows on the north wall. Community leaders, among them St. Brigid's parishioner and City Councilmember Rosie Mendez, then-Manhattan Borough President Scott Stringer, State Senator Martin Connor, and Assemblywoman Sylvia Friedman, who made statements denouncing the demolition and accusing the Archdiocese of greed during an overheated real estate market. A spokesperson for the Archdiocese said the demolition had nothing to do with money, again pointing out that there are no designs to sell the property.

On August 24, 2006, Justice Kapnick extended an order staying the demolition of the church.

=== Reopening ===
On May 22, 2008, the Archdiocese of New York announced it had received an "unexpected but very welcome gift" of $20 million from an anonymous donor after a private meeting with Cardinal Edward M. Egan, the archbishop of New York. The gift includes $10 million to restore the building itself; $2 million to establish an endowment for the parish "so that it might best meet the religious and spiritual needs of the people living in the community"; and $8 million to support St. Brigid’s School and other Catholic schools in need. Cardinal Egan further said in a statement: "This magnificent gift will make it possible for Saint Brigid’s Church to be fittingly restored with its significant structural problems properly addressed. The two additional gifts, to create an endowment for the parish and to support the parish school, are a powerful testament to the donor’s goodness and understanding. He has my heartfelt gratitude, as I recently told him at a meeting in my residence."

On January 27, 2013, worshipers, including descendants of some of the original Irish parishioners, gathered as Timothy Michael Cardinal Dolan consecrated and dedicated the newly renovated building.

With the restoration complete, the nearby church of St. Emeric on Avenue D was closed and the parish merged with St. Brigid. The name of the new parish is "St. Brigid-St. Emeric".

== Architecture ==
St. Brigid's was built in 1848 to a Carpenter Gothic design by twenty-five year old Patrick Keely, who carved the five-pinnacle reredos, organ case, and wooden altar himself.

=== Exterior ===
The brownstone church of St. Brigid’s has a tripartite front façade flanked by bell towers, which once supported spires. The two steeples were removed in 1962 due to safety concerns. The wide center nave is vaulted with an unusual ceiling resembling an upside-down ship’s hull, a nod to the shipwright carpenters whose memory is preserved in corbels decorated with their sculpted faces. In 1877 the wooden beams of the towers, by then decayed and sagging, were replaced with iron.

=== Interior ===
The oil paintings of the stations of the cross, purchased in Paris in the 1870s, are believed to be the work of Théophile-Narcisse Chauvel. The stained glass windows were imported from Bavaria. It was at that time, a carved marble altar replaced the wooden one.

The archdiocese hired Michael F. Doyle of the Acheson Doyle Partners architecture firm to supervise the renovations. Stucco was removed from the stone façade, the building's foundations stabilized, and the remaining stained glass windows returned from storage. Additional stained glass was moved from St. Thomas the Apostle Church in Harlem, which had closed in 2003. The restoration received the 2013 Engineering New-Record Construction Award for best cultural/worship project, citing attention to detail.

== School ==
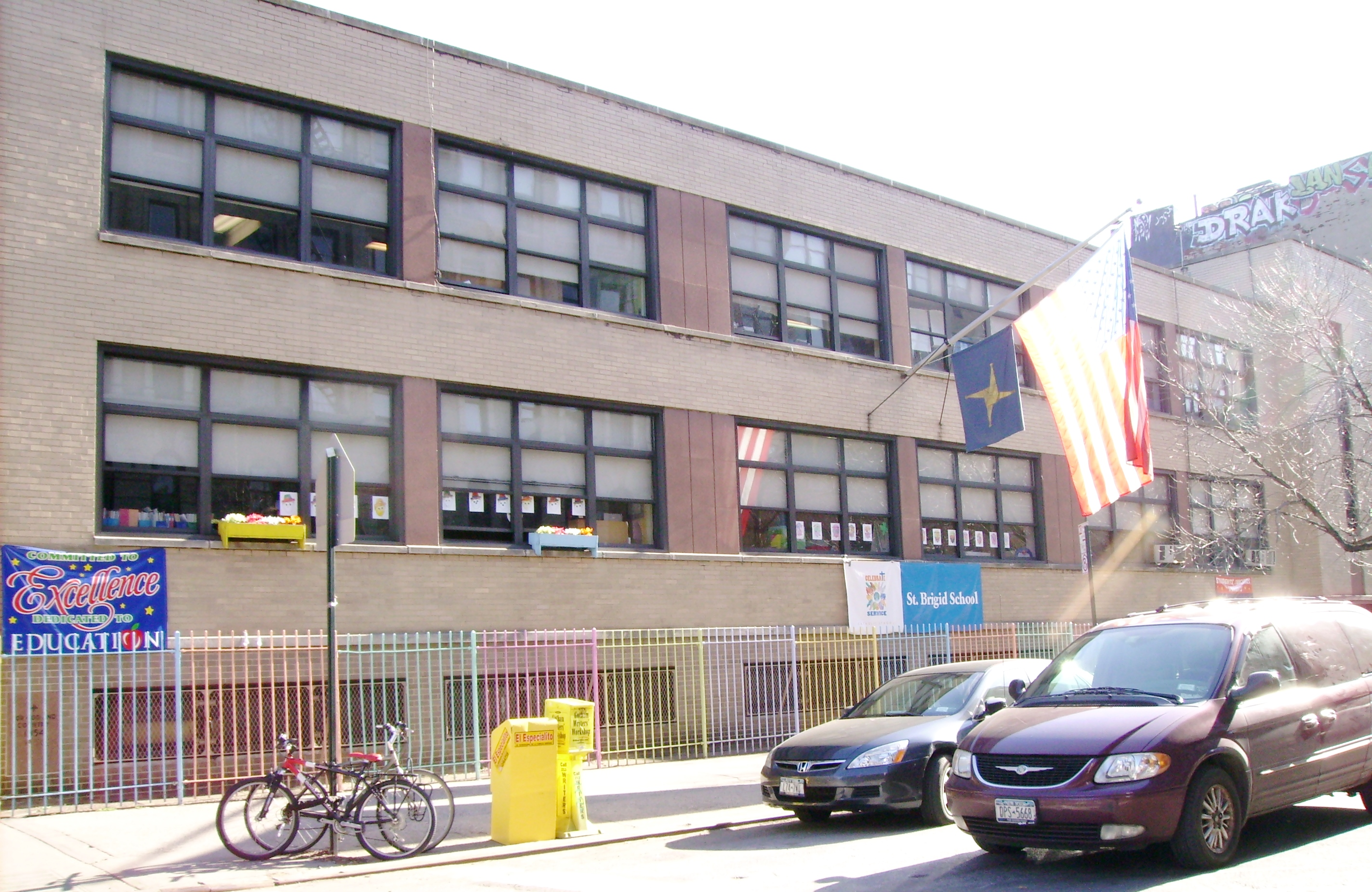
St. Brigid's School

The Rev. Thomas Mooney, pastor of St. Brigid's, founded the school in 1856 in the mostly Irish immigrant section of the Lower East Side. At first, classes were held in the basement of the church. The school building was built and dedicated in 1858 and was located on 8th Street between Avenues B and C. The Christian Brothers taught the boys of the school and the Sisters of Charity taught the girls. Soon after the founding of the school, Fr. Mooney asked the Sisters of Charity to open St. Brigid's Academy on 10th Street, an "excellent select school" with an average enrollment of 200 students. In 1914 enrollment averaged 130 boys and 200 girls.

By 1934, the conditions of the school building had become poor. Because of the Great Depression, the school was forced to closed. By the Post War Period of the 1950s, the parish population increased prompting the building of a new school building at 7th Street between Avenue B and C. The new building opened on September 12, 1954 with an enrollment of 124 students under the direction of the Sisters of Charity. The building was solemnly dedicated and blessed on November 6, 1955 by Francis Cardinal Spellman, Archbishop of New York. The old school building was demolished in 1970.

By the 1990s, the school was ailing: attendance had plummeted from 200 students to 74 in two years, and the number of teachers fell from nine to five. Father Kuhn, who was the church's pastor at the time, attributed it to local poverty. However, others in the community reported as the cause anger by some local parents at Father Kuhn because in a dispute over direction and control of the parish school he fired the popular principal, Maureen Delaney, and three teachers in the middle of the school year. In the 1990s, the Sisters of Charity relinquished their ministry of the school.

A spokeswoman for the Schools of the Archdiocese of New York stated in 1995: "The Cardinal believes very much in the school. We are all operating on the premise that St. Brigid will be with us for a while." From 1995, the parish and school were staffed by the Trinitarians until the closing of the parish church in 2004.

In 2006, the school started a Partnership Program with St. John's University in Literacy and Math. Within a year, the partnership yielded higher student test scores.

As of 2010, the school had approximately 120 students enrolled. On July 15, 2019, the school closed permanently.

== See also ==
- Saint Emeric of Hungary
