= Anthony J. DePace =

American architect

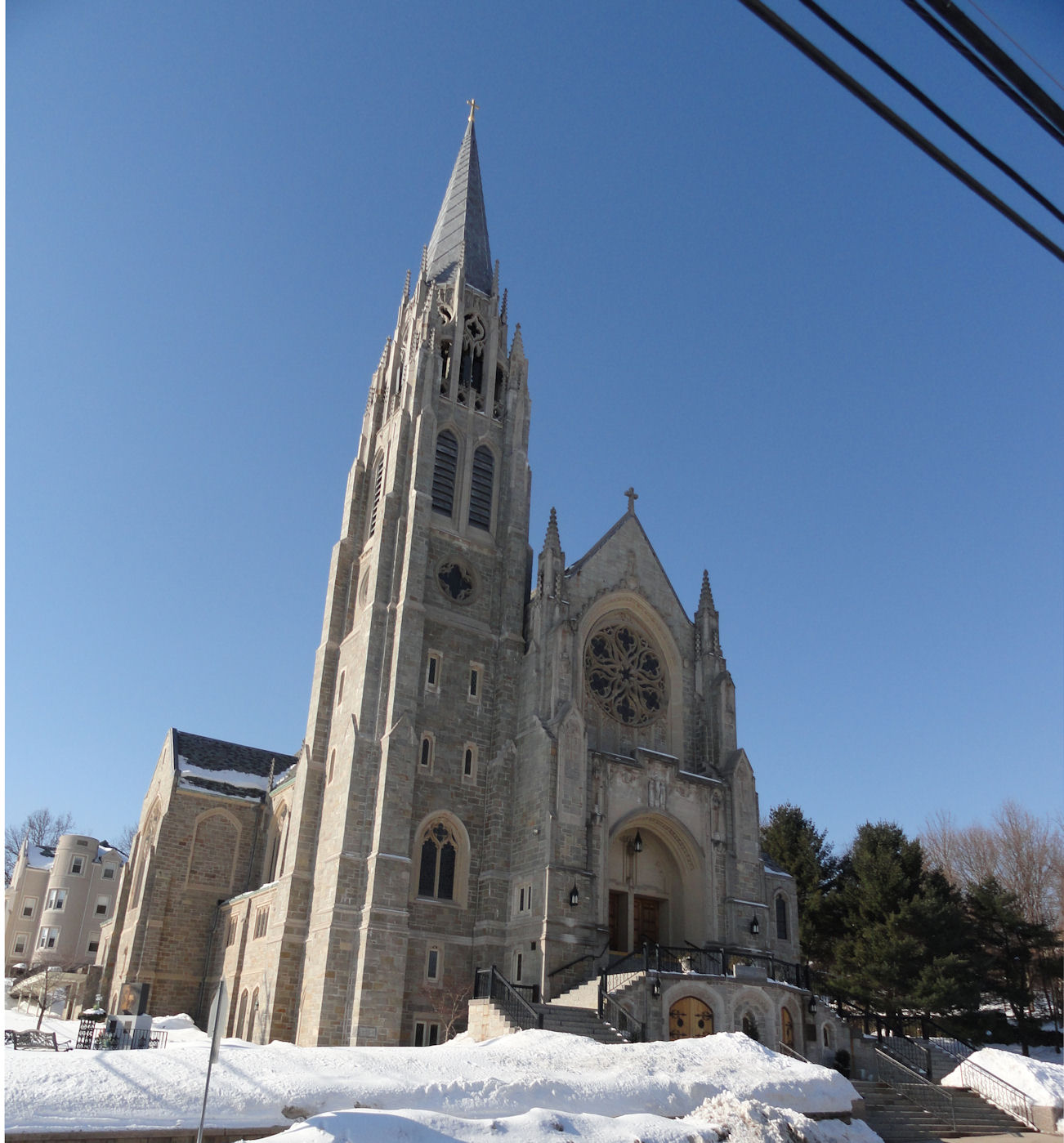
- Holy Cross Church, New Britain CT
- Born: July 13, 1892; Italy
- Died: 1977; New York City
- Known for: Architect

Anthony J. DePace (1892–1977) was an American architect who designed numerous Roman Catholic churches throughout the Northeastern United States area during the mid to late 20th century.

== Early life and education ==
DePace was born on July 13, 1892, in Italy. Shortly thereafter he emigrated to the United States and moved to the Bronx in New York where he lived for the rest of his life. He was educated at Morris High School (Bronx, New York) and studied evenings at the Engineering and Architecture School of New York University, earning a degree there in architectural engineering.

== Early career ==
Upon graduation, he entered the firm of Alfred C. Bossom where he rose to the position of chief draftsman from 1917 to 1920, or alternatively recorded as 1916 to 1921. He then moved to the firm of Cass Gilbert from 1920 to 1923 and served as project manager for the construction of the New York Life Building in New York City, on the hallowed site of Richard M. Upjohn's Madison Square Presbyterian Church, New York City (1854) and later Stanford White's Madison Square Presbyterian Church, New York City (1906).

The NY Life Insurance Tower was erected late in Cass Gilbert's career when the architect had withdrawn from most aspects of design and client relations, even for important projects. While Gilbert was the lead designer of the NY Life, it has been widely reported in his biographies that he appeared very uninterested in the project when meeting with clients and left most of the work to his staff. This might suggest a greater role for DePace.

== DePace and Juster (1923-1947) ==
In 1923, DePace left Cass Gilbert and formed DePace and Juster, in partnership with Samuel Juster. The firm continued in practice until 1947 when the partnership was dissolved.

== Anthony J. DePace, AIA (1947-1977) ==
DePace established his own firm under his own name in 1947 and continued this practice until his death. His office was located at 151 West 46th Street, New York City. However, the firm of Anthony J. DePace, AIA was not listed in the third edition of the American Architects Directory, published 1970.

DePace was a registered architect in Connecticut, Massachusetts, New Jersey, New York, Pennsylvania. He considered his principle works to be St. James's Hospital (Newark, New Jersey) (1960), Cathedral High School (Hartford, Connecticut) (1960), Norwalk Cathedral High School (Norwalk, Connecticut) (1960), Pelham Bay General Hospital (Bronx, New York) (1960), Immaculate Heart Academy (Bergen County, New Jersey) (1961).

== Legacy ==
Over his long career, DePace is remembered as a prolific designer of Roman Catholic churches, schools, rectories and convents. Throughout his career he worked closely with several Roman Catholic Diocese including the Archdiocese of New York (Southern New York), Archdiocese of Newark (Northern New Jersey), Archdiocese of Hartford (Connecticut), Diocese of Brooklyn (Brooklyn and Queens, New York City), Diocese of Bridgeport (Connecticut), and Diocese of Springfield, Massachusetts. Although his work was prolific, he never achieved critical recognition.

== Honors, awards, and publication ==
- 1929: Gold Medal for 5th Ave, 640 Madison Ave
- 1950: Honorable Mention for Holy Year (Rome, Italy) for St. Peter Church (Bridgeport, Connecticut).
- An illustration of his work was published in Illustration of Modern Church Design (1932).

== Works include ==
Archdiocese of New York:

- 1925: St. Dominic Church, Bronx, New York
- 1929-1931: St. Clare of Assisi Church, Bronx, New York
- 1930, 1970: St. Theresa of the Infant Jesus Church, Bronx, New York (both the first church (1930) and its replacement (1970s))
- 1931: St. Roch's Church, Bronx, New York (as DePace & Juster)
- 1939: St. Vincent De Paul Church, New York, New York (façade (1939), church by Henry Engelbert (1857)
- 1949: Our Lady of Mt. Carmel School, Bronx, New York
- St. Valentine Church, Bronx, New York (now St. Thomas Syro-Malabar Church)
- St. Vito Church, Mamaroneck, New York
- Sacred Heart Church, Newburgh, New York
- Nazareth High School, Brooklyn, New York

Diocese of Brooklyn:

- Basilica of Regina Pacis, Brooklyn, New York
- Our Lady of Grace Church, Brooklyn, New York
- St. Adalbert Church, Queens, New York
- Nativity of the Blessed Virgin Mary Church, Ozone Park, New York

Archdiocese of Newark:

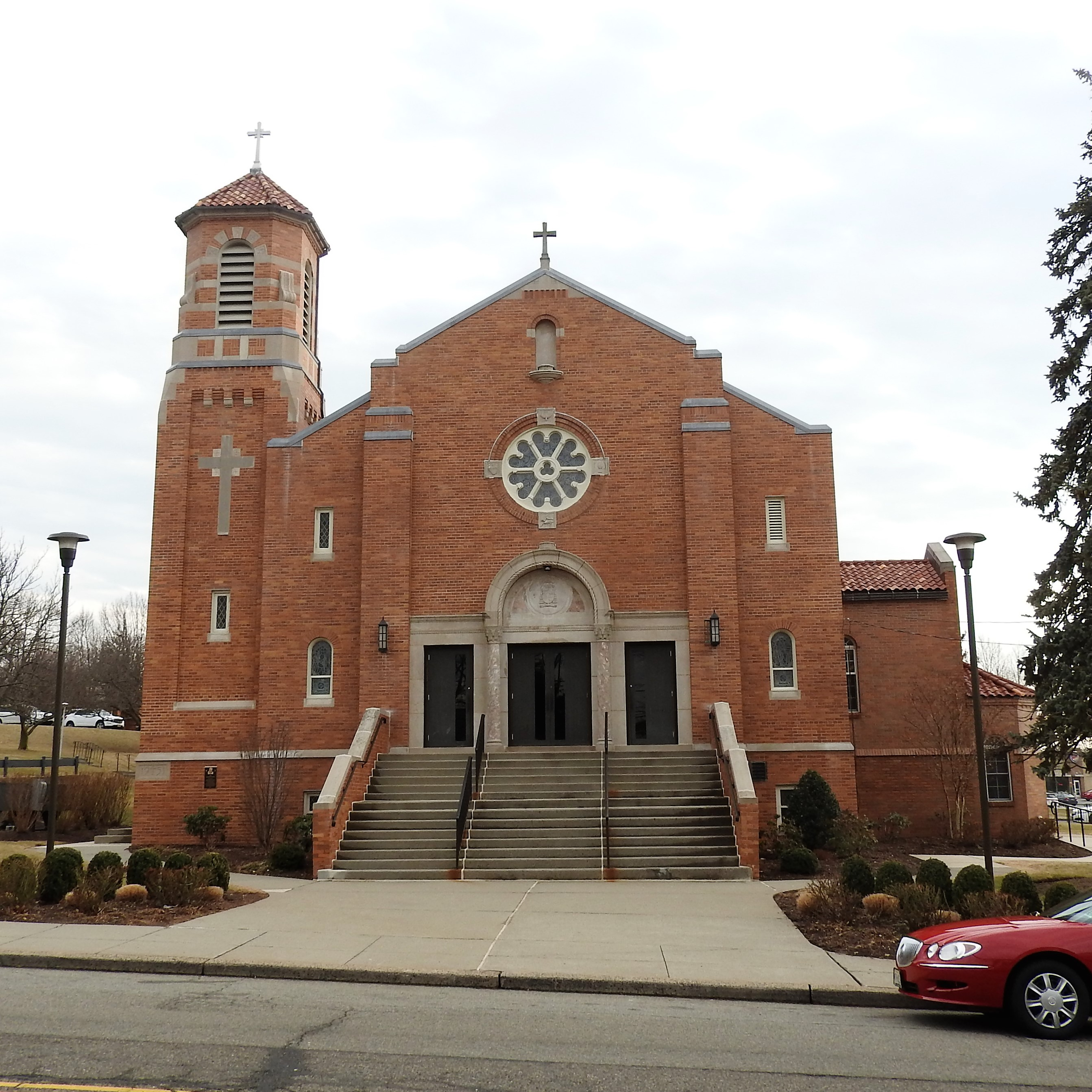
Saint Catherine of Sienna, Cedar Grove

- St. Aloysius Church, Caldwell, New Jersey
- Holy Family Church, Nutley, New Jersey
- St. Thomas the Apostle Church, Bloomfield, New Jersey
- St. Rose of Lima Church, East Hanover, New Jersey
- St. Ann Church Fair Lawn, New Jersey
- Our Lady of Mt. Carmel Church, Montclair, New Jersey
- St. Catherine of Sienna Church, Cedar Grove, New Jersey
- Our Lady of Sorrows Church, Jersey City, New Jersey
- Holy Rosary School, Jersey City, New Jersey
- Sacred Heart of Jesus Church, Irvington, New Jersey
- Our Lady of Mt. Carmel Church, Orange, New Jersey
- Most Holy Name Church, Garfield, New Jersey

Archdiocese of Hartford:

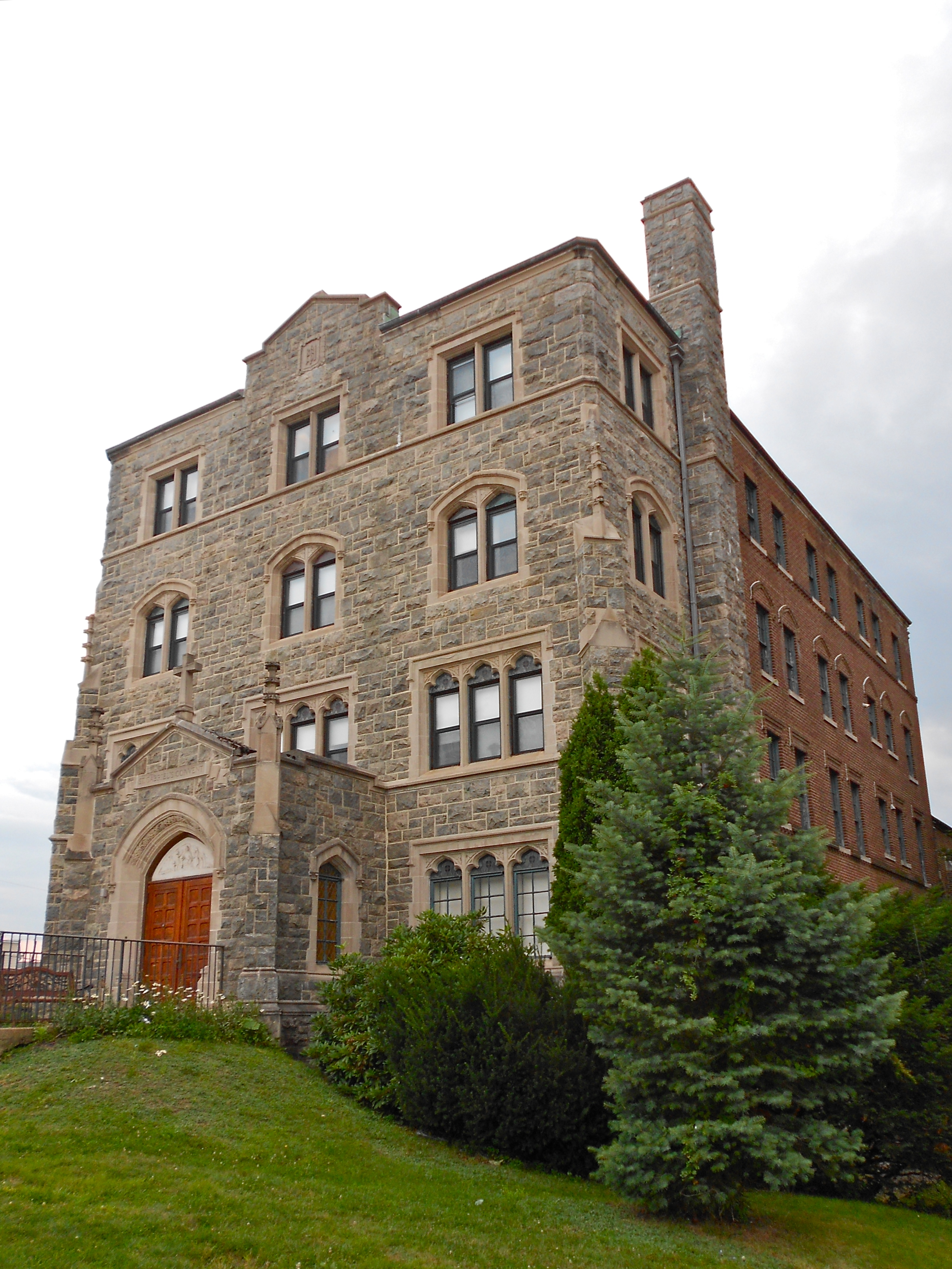
Convent at St. Gabriel's, Hazelton, Pennsylvania

- Holy Cross Church, New Britain, Connecticut
- St. Ann Church, New Britain, Connecticut
- Our Lady of Mt. Carmel Church, Waterbury, Connecticut
- St. Ann Church, Hamden, Connecticut

Diocese of Bridgeport, Connecticut:

- St. Ambrose Church, Bridgeport, Connecticut
- Holy Rosary Church, Bridgeport, Connecticut
- St. Peter Church, Bridgeport, Connecticut
- St. Emery Church, Fairfield, Connecticut
- St. Anthony Church, Fairfield, Connecticut

Diocese of Worcester, Massachusetts:

- Sacred Heart Church Milford, Massachusetts

Diocese of Springfield, Massachusetts:

- Christ the King Church, Ludlow, Massachusetts
- St. Anthony Church, North Adams, Massachusetts
- St. Thomas Church, Palmer, Massachusetts

elsewhere:

- Christ the King Church, Columbus, Ohio
- Liberal Arts Building and Rotunda at Marywood College, Scranton, Pennsylvania (with Professor Gonippo Raggi, artist)
- 1937: convent at St. Gabriel's Catholic Parish Complex, Hazleton, Pennsylvania.
