= Our Lady of Solace Church (Bronx) =

Church building in New York, US

Coordinates: 40°50′45″N 73°51′53″W

The Church of Our Lady of Solace
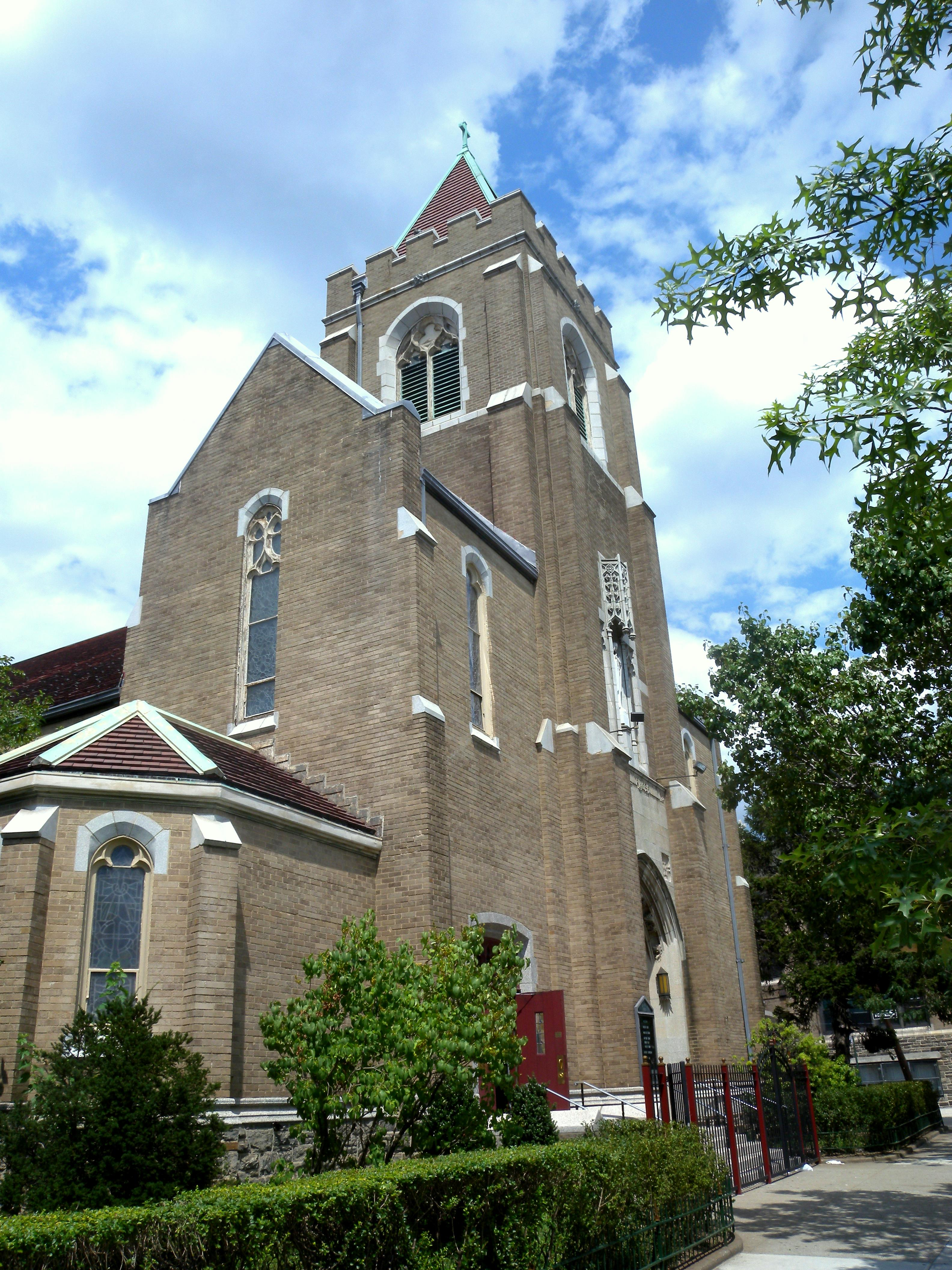
- Interactive map of the The Church of Our Lady of Solace area

General information
- Architectural style: Gothic Revival
- Location: Van Nest, the Bronx, New York City, United States
- Completed: 1929
- Client: Roman Catholic Archdiocese of New York

Technical details
- Structural system: Masonry brick

The Church of Our Lady of Solace is a Roman Catholic parish church under the authority of the Roman Catholic Archdiocese of New York, located at 731 Morris Park Avenue at the intersection with Holland Avenue, the Bronx, New York City in the Van Nest neighborhood.

== History ==
The parish was established 1903. The founding pastor was Daniel Joseph Curley, future Bishop of Syracuse. Construction began on the church in June 1903. The architect was William E. Walsh; the builder, William Maher.

The rectory address is 731 Morris Park Ave., Bronx, NY 10462.

The present church was dedicated in 1929. For many years, the Sisters of the Presentation staffed the parish school. Our Lady of Solace school closed in 2006. Students from the parish then attended St. Dominic's parish school. In 2010 the school building was leased to the Bronx Charter School of Excellence.

St. Dominic's parochial school was among 27 closed by the Archdiocese of New York in 2011. The religious education program of both parishes is conducted at the St. Dominic's Faith Formation Center, the former St. Dominic's convent.

The parish hosts Our Lady Of Solace Food Pantry.

There is a separate shrine to Our Lady of Solace in Brooklyn.
