= Saint Ambrose Catholic School =

Saint Ambrose Catholic School or Saint Ambrose School may refer to:

- Saint Ambrose Catholic School - Tucson, Arizona
- Saint Ambrose Catholic School - Deerfield Beach, Florida - List of schools of the Roman Catholic Archdiocese of Miami
- Saint Ambrose School - Godfrey, Illinois
- Saint Ambrose Catholic School - Cheverly, Maryland - List of schools of the Roman Catholic Archdiocese of Washington
- Saint Ambrose of Woodbury Catholic School - Woodbury, Minnesota
- Saint Ambrose Catholic Elementary School - Saint Louis, Missouri
- Saint Ambrose School - Old Bridge, New Jersey - List of schools of the Roman Catholic Diocese of Metuchen
- Saint Ambrose School - Latham, New York
- Saint Ambrose Catholic School - Brunswick, Ohio
- Saint Ambrose School - Schuylkill Haven, Pennsylvania
- Saint Ambrose Catholic School - Houston, Texas - List of schools of the Roman Catholic Archdiocese of Galveston-Houston
- Saint Ambrose Catholic School - Annandale, Virginia
