= Hudson River Psychiatric Center =

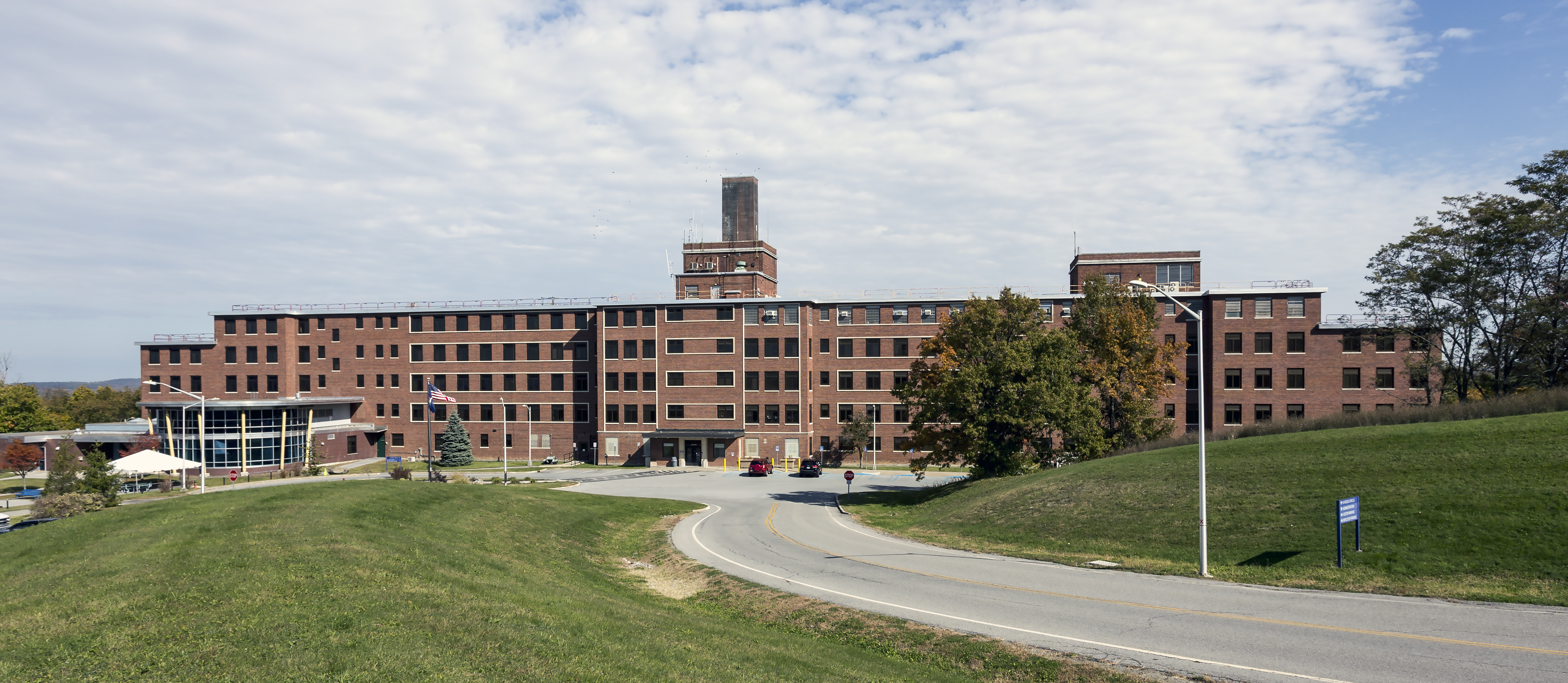
- The former Hudson River Psychiatric Center in 2015

Geography
- Location: 10 Ross Circle, Poughkeepsie, New York, United States
- Coordinates: 41°44′24.1″N 73°54′14.6″W

Organization
- Type: Psychiatric hospital

History
- Closed: January 2012

Links
- Lists: Hospitals in New York State

The Hudson River Psychiatric Center in Poughkeepsie, New York was a building and a psychiatric facility for adults operated by the New York State Office of Mental Health. It was closed in January 2012, and patients were moved to Rockland Psychiatric Center.

It was located at 10 Ross Circle, in Poughkeepsie, not far from the defunct Hudson River State Hospital. The property continues to serve as an Office of Mental Health field office.
