= Louise Caselotti =

American opera singer (1910–1999)

- Born: Marie Louise Caselotti; August 23, 1910; Bridgeport, Connecticut, U.S.
- Died: July 13, 1999 (aged 88); Malibu, California, U.S.
- Occupations: Mezzo soprano; Contralto; Vocal coach; Actress; Voice actress; Singer
- Years active: 1927–1999
- Spouse: Edgar Richard Bagarozy (m. 1938; died 1967)
- Parent(s): Maria Orefice (mother); Guido Caselotti (father)
- Relatives: Adriana Caselotti (sister)

Marie Louise Caselotti (August 23, 1910 – July 13, 1999), also known as Luisa Caselotti, was an American opera singer and vocal coach of Italian descent. A prolific performer who specialized in the mezzo-soprano and contralto repertoire, she was famously noted for singing the title role in Georges Bizet's Carmen over 400 times. Beyond her stage career, she was a pioneer in early Italian-language sound cinema and the primary vocal teacher for the legendary soprano Maria Callas.

== Early life and education ==
Born in Bridgeport, Connecticut, Caselotti was the daughter of the noted music professor Guido Hocke-Caselotti and operatic soprano Maria Orefice. Her younger sister, Adriana Caselotti, would later become famous as the original voice of Disney's Snow White. The family lived in New York before moving to Italy in 1924 for two years, where both sisters received intensive vocal training. Upon their return to the U.S. in 1926, the family settled in Los Angeles, where Guido and Maria established a voice studio.

== Career ==
=== Operatic ===
Caselotti made her professional debut in 1927 with the San Carlo Grand Opera Company at the Los Angeles Philharmonic Auditorium. Her portrayal of Carmen became her signature, and she performed the role throughout the Americas, including a highly acclaimed run in Havana, Cuba, at age 16. She was particularly noted for having sung the title role in Carmen more than four hundred times, and she also appeared notably as Azucena in Il trovatore.

=== Acting ===
She performed in Italian motion pictures in the early 1930s. In 1930, she starred as Giorgina in Sei Tu l'Amore, the first Italian-language "talkie" produced in the United States. She followed this in 1931 with a lead role in Il Grande Sentiero (the Italian version of The Big Trail). During the 1930s, she was a regular performer on CBS radio and experimental television broadcasts. She sang on radio and even experimental television broadcasts in the 1930s for CBS. She dubbed the voices of several leading Hollywood actresses in the late 1930s and early 1940s.

In the 1948, Louise was under contract to play the title role in a film version of Carmen, but the project was eventually canceled by the studio, and the studio made The Loves of Carmen with Rita Hayworth as Carmen.

=== Vocal Coaching of Maria Callas ===
In late 1945, Caselotti met a young, then-up coming singer Maria Callas. From January 1946 to July 1947, Caselotti served as Callas's primary vocal coach in New York City. Callas visited Caselotti's apartment daily for sessions lasting five to six hours. Caselotti helped Callas refine her technique and transition from a heavy "contralto" sound to a more versatile dramatic soprano. This period of study ended when Caselotti's husband, Eddie Bagarozy, arranged for Callas's career-defining debut in La Gioconda at the Arena di Verona in 1947.

Caselotti and Bagarozy managed the career of a promising Greek-American soprano, Maria Callas, and introduced her to the Metropolitan Opera's general director Edward Johnson. Caselotti was Callas' vocal coach during 1946 and 1947.

=== Management and legal dispute ===
Caselotti's husband, attorney Eddie Bagarozy, managed Callas’s early career under a 10% commission contract. When Callas became an international star and discontinued the partnership, Bagarozy filed a high-profile $300,000 lawsuit for breach of contract. The legal battle reached a head in 1955 when a U.S. Marshal famously served Callas with a summons backstage at the Lyric Opera of Chicago—an enterprise Bagarozy himself had helped plant the seeds for. The case was eventually settled out of court in 1957.

=== Later years ===
Following the legal scandal, Caselotti largely retired from public performance to focus on teaching voice. She lived in Malibu, California for many years and survived her husband, who died in 1967, by over three decades.

== Personal life ==
In 1938 she married attorney Edgar Richard "Eddie" Bagarozy son of Anthony Bagarozy and Maria Conti. The couple lived in a Riverside Drive apartment in Manhattan. Bagarozy wanted to start his own opera company, but ultimately found the enterprise beyond his abilities. Nevertheless, he planted the seeds for what ultimately became the Lyric Opera of Chicago.

Caselotti's younger sister, Adriana, was the voice of Snow White in Walt Disney's 1937 Technicolor animated feature.

== Death ==
She died of lung cancer at her home on July 13, 1999, at the age of 88.

== Filmography ==
=== Film ===
Year	Title	Role	Notes
1930	Sei Tu I'Amore	Giorgina	The first Italian-language "talkie" produced in the United States.
1931	Il Grande Sentiero	Rita Alberti	Italian version of The Big Trail

== Stage ==
=== Theatre ===
Year	Title	Role(s)	Venue(s)	Notes
1927	Il trovatore	Azucena	San Carlo Opera Company	Professional debut at Los Angeles Philharmonic Auditorium
1920s	Carmen	Carmen	Columbia Opera Company	Performed in Havana, Cuba; first major success in the role
1934	Carmen	Carmen	New York Hippodrome	Debut at the venue
1935	Carmen	Carmen	New York Hippodrome	Performed for an audience of over 5,000
1927–1940s	Aida	Amneris	Various	Frequent repertoire staple
1927–1940s	Carmen	Carmen	Various	Totaled over 400 lifetime performances in the title role
