= Donald's Ostrich =

1937 Donald Duck cartoon

- Theatrical release poster
- Directed by: Jack King
- Story by: Carl Barks
- Produced by: Walt Disney
- Starring: Elvia Allman; Billy Bletcher; Clarence Nash; Pinto Colvig; Jean Murtagh; Zena Baer; Don Brodie; Jack Clifford; Jack Crosby; Adriana Caselotti
- Music by: Oliver Wallace
- Animation by: Jack Hannah; Paul Allen; Johnny Cannon
- Color process: Technicolor
- Production company: Walt Disney Productions
- Distributed by: RKO Radio Pictures
- Release date: December 10, 1937
- Running time: 9 minutes
- Country: United States
- Language: English

Donald's Ostrich is an animated short film produced in Technicolor by Walt Disney Productions and released to theaters on December 10, 1937, by RKO Radio Pictures. It was the first film to be originally released in the Donald Duck series of short films, although billed on the poster at the time as a Mickey Mouse cartoon.

Donald's Ostrich was directed by Jack King and features the voices of Clarence Nash as Donald Duck, Pinto Colvig as Hortense the Ostrich, and Elvia Allman, Adriana Caselotti and Billy Bletcher as radio voices.

== Plot ==
Donald is working along as a custodian at a whistle stop train station and is responsible for loading and unloading luggage. A train passes the station and dumps a large pile of luggage on Donald without stopping. Donald finds that one of the crates contains an ostrich and tied around the ostrich's neck he finds the following note: "My name is HORTENSE. Please see that I am fed and watered. P.S. I eat anything!"

Hortense begins to eat anything she can find at the station starting with the message. This includes Donald Duck's bottom. She then eats a concertina, a wind-up alarm clock and several balloons. This causes Hortense to have hiccups which Donald tries to cure by scaring her.

Finally Hortense swallows Donald's radio and her body begins to react to what is playing on the radio. Donald realizes Hortense has swallowed the radio and grabs a pair of forceps to try to pull it out (but ends up getting the concertina out instead). When Hortense starts to react to a broadcast car race, Donald is unable to control her. Hortense finally crashes through a door which at last knocks the radio out of her, but she also gives Donald the hiccups.

== Production ==
The idea for the story began in 1933, as a Mickey Mouse cartoon called "The Station Agent". Over time, Donald was added to the outline as a secondary character, and once the studio began producing solo Donald Duck shorts, this became a Donald feature.

While Donald's Ostrich was the first and only time that Hortense the Ostrich appeared in animation, she later appeared as a comic book character as Donald's pet. Her first comic appearance was in the first publication of the Donald Duck Annual in 1938.

Hortense also appeared in the Donald Duck comic strip, first appearing on October 3, 1938 for a few weeks, and then appearing very occasionally until her last appearance on October 30, 1944.

== Deleted scenes ==
One of the scenes involves Donald dressing up as Frankenstein's monster and scaring Hortense. The reason for cutting this out of the official version might have been that the design of the monster was copyrighted by Universal. These scenes were not included for theatrical release in the United States, but they are left intact on a Pathescope 9.5mm release of the film in the United Kingdom, dated from February 1938. The scenes were also compiled as a separate Pathescope release, titled Donald's Disguise.

== Voice cast ==
- Clarence Nash as Donald Duck
- Pinto Colvig as Hortense the Ostrich
- Elvia Allman as Lady Chef on Radio
- Billy Bletcher as Villain on Radio
- Jean Murtagh as Radio Singer
- Adriana Caselotti as Opera Singer
- Zena Bar, Don Brodie, Jack Clifford, and Jack Crosby as Radio Voices

== Home media ==
The short was released on May 18, 2004, on Walt Disney Treasures: The Chronological Donald, Volume One: 1934-1941.

It was also released on VHS on Walt Disney Cartoon Classics Vol. 2: Here's Donald.
