= St. Ambrose Church =

St. Ambrose Church, Saint Ambrose Parish, Sant'Ambrogio, Église Saint-Ambroise, or variations, may refer to:

== Australia ==
- St Ambrose Church, Brunswick, Victoria
- St Ambrose Church, Gilgandra, New South Wales

== Canada ==
- Saint-Ambroise Church, Montreal

== France ==
- Saint-Ambroise, Paris

== Italy ==
- Saint Ambrose, Brugherio, a church in Italy
- Sant'Ambrogio, Florence
- Basilica of Sant'Ambrogio, Milan

== United Kingdom ==
- St Ambrose's Church, Bristol
- St Ambrose's Church, Grindleton, Lancashire
- St Ambrose's Church, Speke, Liverpool
- St Ambrose Church, Westbourne, Dorset

== United States ==
- St. Ambrose Church (Bridgeport, Connecticut)
- St. Ambrose Church (Cheverly, Maryland)
- St. Ambrose Cathedral (Des Moines, Iowa)
- St. Ambrose Church (New York City)
- St. Ambrose Church (St. Nazianz, Wisconsin)
- St. Ambrose Church (West Hollywood, California)

== See also ==
- St. Ambrose Cathedral (disambiguation)
