= Adriana Caselotti =

American actress and singer (1916–1997)

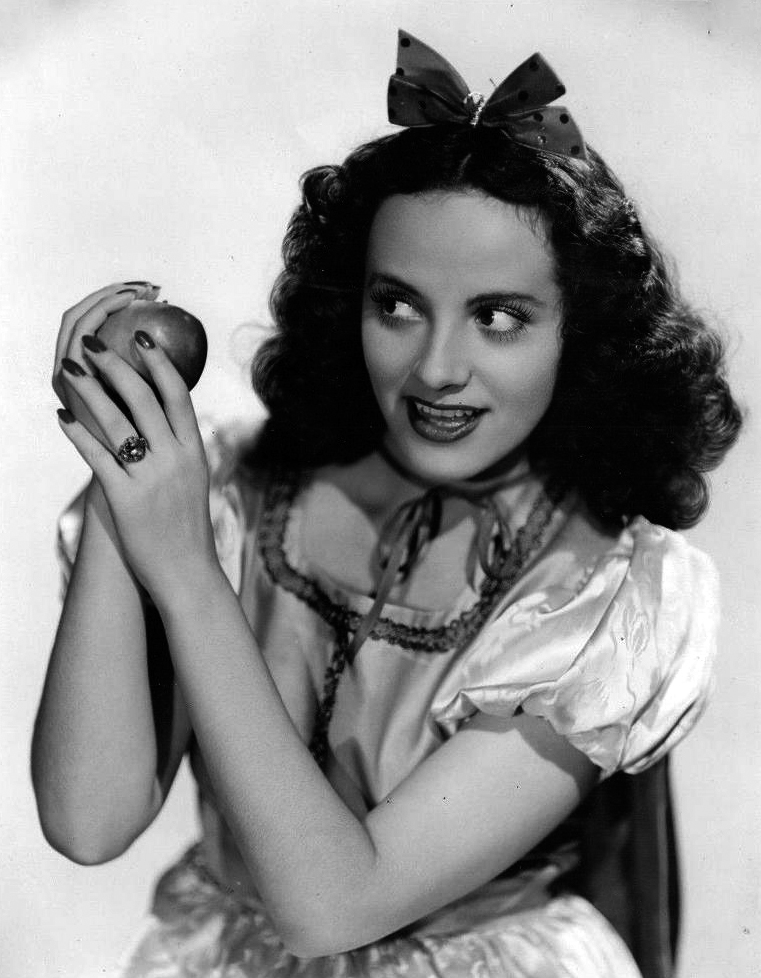
- Caselotti in 1944
- Born: Adriana Elena Loretta Caselotti; May 6, 1916; Bridgeport, Connecticut, U.S.
- Died: January 19, 1997 (aged 80); Los Angeles, California, U.S.
- Education: Hollywood High School
- Occupations: Actress; voice actress; singer
- Years active: 1932–1997
- Notable work: Original voice of Snow White in Walt Disney's Snow White and the Seven Dwarfs (1937)
- Spouses: Robert James Chard (m. 1945, divorced) Norval Weir Mitchell (m. 1952; died 1972) Joseph Dana Costigan (m. 1972; died 1982) Florian St. Pierre (m. 1989, divorced)
- Parent(s): Maria Orefice (mother); Guido Caselotti (father)
- Relatives: Louise Caselotti (sister)
- Awards: Disney Legend (1994)

Adriana Elena Loretta Caselotti (May 6, 1916 – January 19, 1997) was an American actress and singer. Caselotti was best known as the voice of the title character of the first Walt Disney animated feature, Snow White and the Seven Dwarfs (1937), for which she was named a Disney Legend in 1994, making her the first female voice-over artist to achieve this.

== Early life ==
Adriana Elena Loretta Caselotti was born in Bridgeport, Connecticut on May 6, 1916 to an Italian-American family. Her father, Guido Luigi Emanuele Caselotti, was an immigrant from Udine, and worked as a music teacher and vocal coach, and served as the organist for the Holy Rosary Church; and her mother, Maria Josephine (née Orefice) from Casavatore, was a singer (coloratura soprano) in the Royal Opera Theatre of Rome. Her older sister, Louise, sang opera and gave voice lessons—Maria Callas being a student of hers. When Caselotti was seven years old, her family left Connecticut for Italy, while her mother toured with an opera company. Caselotti was educated and boarded at the San Getulio convent, near Rome. When her family returned to New York three years later, Caselotti re-learned English and studied singing with her father. In 1934, Caselotti attended Hollywood High School where she sang in the senior class Girls' Glee Club and had a leading role in the school's annual musical, The Belle of New York.

== Career ==
In 1935, after her brief stint as a chorus girl and session singer at MGM, Walt Disney hired Caselotti as the voice of the heroine, Snow White. She was paid a total of $970 for working on the film (equivalent to $21,724 in 2025). She was not credited for the role, and had trouble finding new opportunities later in life. Jack Benny specifically mentioned that he had asked Walt Disney for permission to use her on his radio show and was told, "I'm sorry, but that voice can't be used anywhere. I don't want to spoil the illusion of Snow White."

After her work in Snow White, Caselotti tried a career in opera at the urging of her family. Her only role on the operatic stage was Gilda in Verdi’s Rigoletto, which she sang in 1944. It wasn’t a very successful affair, according to Caselotti herself.

“I did Gilda in Rigoletto three times. First time, I had a cold. Second time, I was scared to death. Third time, I threw up backstage, and said, 'I'm going back to 'Snow White.’”

Caselotti also had several more jobs in the film business afterwards. The two most well-known were an uncredited role in MGM's The Wizard of Oz (1939) as the voice of Juliet during the Tin Woodman's song "If I Only Had a Heart", speaking the line "Wherefore art thou Romeo?" and an uncredited role in Frank Capra's It's a Wonderful Life (1946), singing in Martini's bar as James Stewart is praying.

Adriana Caselotti appeared in several promotional spots for Snow White and the Seven Dwarfs and signed memorabilia during promotional events. On November 22, 1972 (Thanksgiving Day), she guest-starred on an episode of The Julie Andrews Hour saluting the music of Walt Disney, singing "I'm Wishing" and "Some Day My Prince Will Come" with Julie Andrews. She also made a guest appearance on the syndicated The Mike Douglas Show. Caselotti later wrote a how-to book, Do You Like to Sing?.

In the early 1990s, when the Snow White Grotto at Disneyland was refurbished, Caselotti, at the age of 75, re-recorded "I'm Wishing" for the Snow White Wishing Well exhibit. In 1994, she was named a Disney Legend. She also sold autographs in her later years.

== Personal life ==
Caselotti was married four times. Her first husband was Robert James Chard, a local theater ticket broker whom she married in 1945. The marriage ended in divorce. She later met actor Norval Weir Mitchell, whom she married in 1952. He retired after marrying her and died in 1972. The same year, she was married to a podiatrist, Joseph Dana Costigan, who died in 1982. Caselotti married her last husband, Joseph Laureat Florian St. Pierre, a retired postal employee, in 1989 and they later divorced.

== Death ==
Caselotti died of cancer at her Los Angeles home on January 19, 1997, at the age of 80.

== Filmography ==
=== Television ===
Year	Title	Role	Notes
1950	One Hour in Wonderland	Snow White	Voice actress

=== Television shows ===
Year	Title	Role	Notes
1972	The Julie Andrews Hour	Herself	Aired on Thanksgiving Day
1981	A Gift of Music	Herself	TV special
1983	The Tonight Show Starring Johnny Carson	Herself	Desk - "Vacation Snapshots"
1983	The Magical World of Disney	Herself	Episode: 20
1985	Disney Family Album	Herself	"Voice Actors"
1993	John & Leeza from Hollywood	Herself	Season 1: Episode 14

=== Animation ===
Year	Film	Role	Notes
1937	Modern Inventions	Robot Nurse Maid	Voice actress
1937	Donald's Ostrich	Opera Singer	Voice actress
1944	Donald's Off Day	Singer of Opening Song	Voice actress

=== Film ===
Year	Film	Role	Notes
1935	Naughty Marietta	Dancing Doll	Actress
1936	Toby Tortoise Returns	Bunny Girl	Voice actress
1937	The Bride Wore Red	First Peasant Girl	Actress
1937	Snow White and the Seven Dwarfs	Snow White	Voice actress
1939	The Wizard of Oz	Juliet	Voice actress
1942	We Were Dancing	Opera Singer	Actress
1945	Hobo's Lady	Pom Pom	Voice actress
1946	It's a Wonderful Life	Singer at Martini's	Actress
1946	Two Sisters from Boston	Opera Singer	Actress
1978	Business as Usual	Snow White	Voice actress
1981	Once Upon a Mouse	Snow White	Voice actress
1983	The Fairest of Them All	Herself	TV movie
1990	Celebrating Walt Disney's 'Snow White and the Seven Dwarfs': The One That Started It All	Snow White	Voice actress
1992	The Music of Disney: A Legacy in Song	Snow White	Voice actress
1993	The Best of Disney Music: A Legacy in Song - Part I	Herself	TV movie

=== Radio ===
Year	Title	Role	Notes
1951	Lux Radio Theatre	Snow White / Herself	Lux Radio Theatre Intermission

== Stage ==
=== Theatre ===
Year	Title	Role(s)	Venue(s)	Notes
1934	The Belle of New York	Violet Gray	Los Angeles Unified School District	Debut
1944	Rigoletto	Gilda	Los Angeles	She portrayed the role of Gilda three times.

== Awards and recognition ==
Year	Award	Category	Result	Nominated work	Ref.
1994	Disney Legends	Animation—Voice	Won	Snow White and the Seven Dwarfs	
