= St. Ambrose Church (Bridgeport, Connecticut) =

Coordinates: 41°11′36.47″N 73°09′52.62″W

- St. Ambrose Church
- Location: 1596 Boston Avenue; Bridgeport, Connecticut
- Country: United States
- Denomination: Roman Catholic

Architecture
- Architect: Anthony J. DePace of DePace & Juster

Administration
- Province: Hartford
- Diocese: Bridgeport

Clergy
- Bishop: Most Rev. Frank Caggiano

St. Ambrose Church was a Catholic parish church in Bridgeport, Connecticut, part of the Diocese of Bridgeport. The church was sometimes referred to as the Church on the Hill. St. Ambrose's Church was a landmark in this part of Bridgeport, Connecticut, built in a Romanesque style in 1939 to the designs of Brooklyn architect Anthony J. DePace of DePace & Juster. The parish was closed in 2012. In 2022, the property was announced as the new site of Fairfield Bellarmine, a new campus of Fairfield University.
