= St. Peter Church (Bridgeport, Connecticut) =

Coordinates: 41°10′35.28″N 73°12′49.26″W

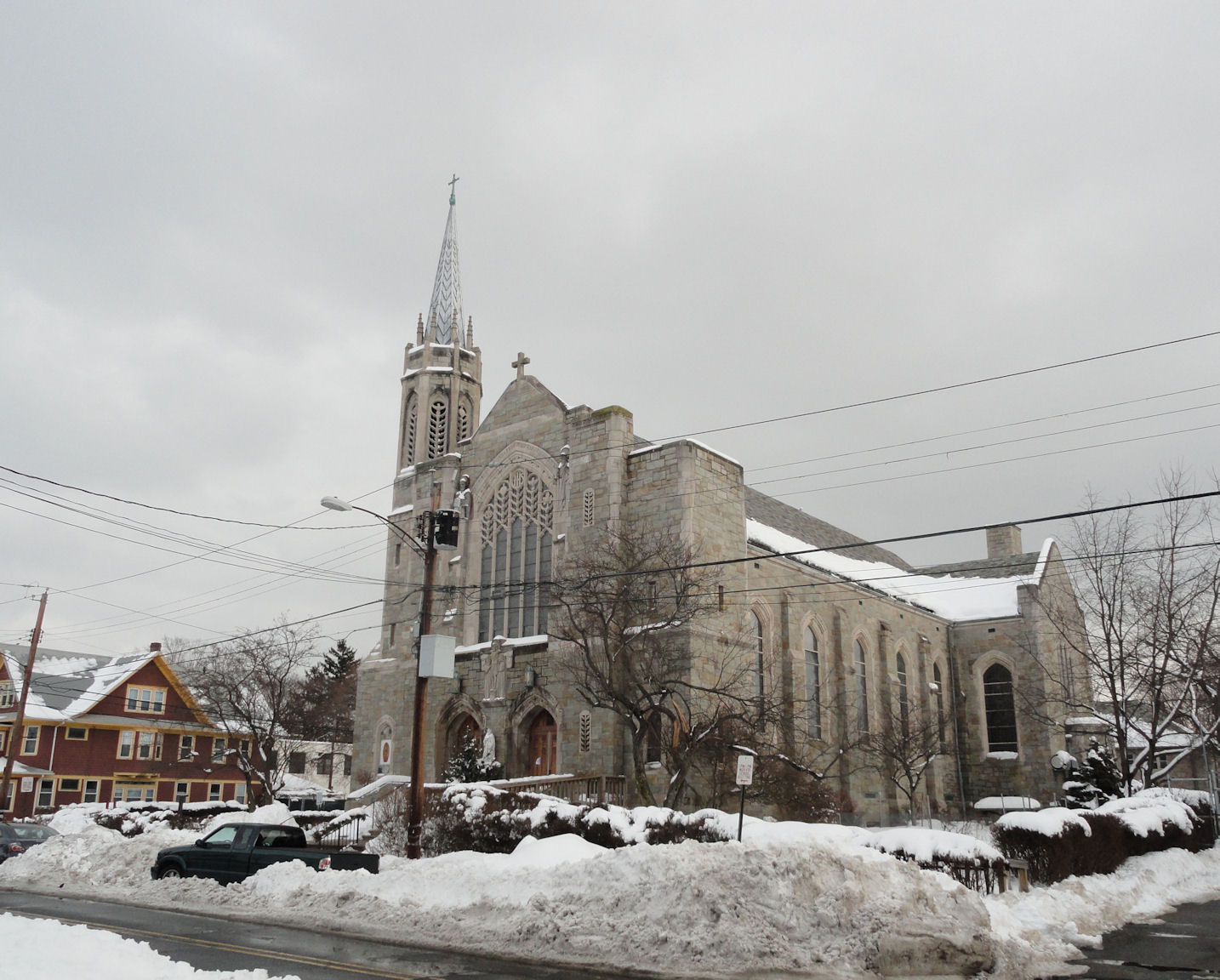
- St. Peter Church
- Location: 695 Colorado Avenue; Bridgeport, Connecticut
- Country: United States
- Denomination: Roman Catholic

Architecture
- Architect: Anthony J. DePace

Administration
- Province: Hartford
- Diocese: Bridgeport

Clergy
- Pastor: Msgr. Aniceto Villamide

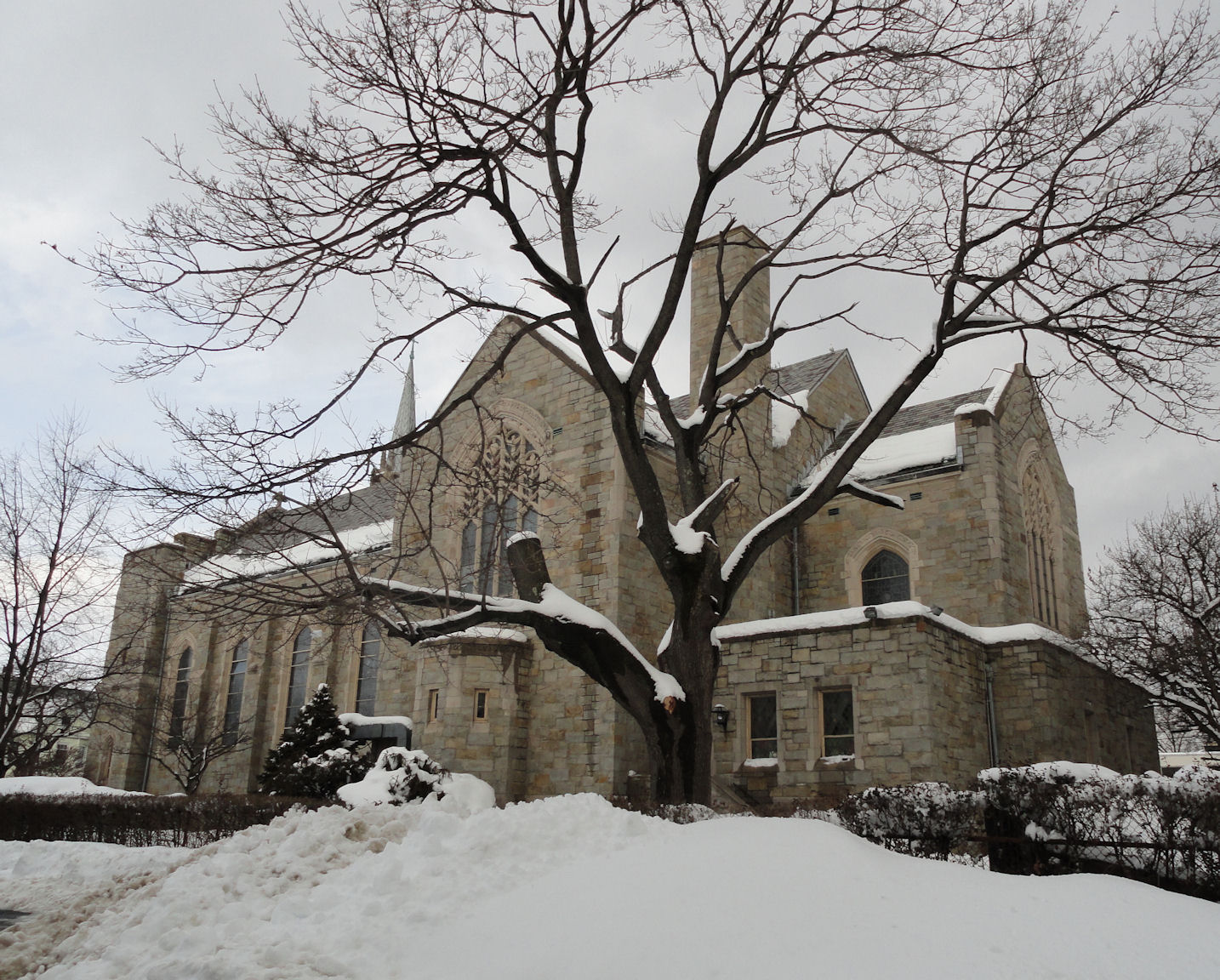
St. Peter Church Bridgeport Connecticut as seen from behind

St. Peter is a Roman Catholic church in Bridgeport, Connecticut, part of the Diocese of Bridgeport.

== History ==
This Gothic Revival church dates from 1940 and was designed by Anthony J. DePace of New York. Mr. DePace was awarded Honorable Mention for Holy Year (Rome, Italy) for his design of this church.
