= The Loves of Carmen =

The Loves of Carmen may refer to three films:

- The Loves of Carmen (1917 film), a silent film starring Pola Negri
- The Loves of Carmen (1927 film), a silent film starring Dolores Del Rio
- The Loves of Carmen (1948 film), a remake of the 1927 film, starring Rita Hayworth
