= Miyoshi Sugimachi =

American soprano singer

- Born: Miyoshi Natori; April 20, 1905; Fujimi, Nagano prefecture, Japan
- Died: July 3, 1983 (aged 78); Seattle, Washington, U.S.
- Other names: Miyoshi Yorita, Mimi Yorita, Madame Sugi Machi
- Occupation: Singer

Miyoshi Sugimachi (April 20, 1905 – July 3, 1983), born Miyoshi Natori and later known as Miyoshi Yorita, was a Japanese-American soprano singer who toured internationally in the 1920s and 1930s.

== Early life and education ==
Natori was born in Fujimi, Nagano prefecture, Japan, and raised in Seattle, Washington, the daughter of Ryoryo Natori and Oriko Ono. She studied voice in Italy, and with Guido Caselotti.

== Career ==
Sugimachi, a lyric soprano, sang on radio programs in Seattle and Los Angeles in the 1920s, and with the Seattle Civic Opera Company. "Sugimachi has a brilliant voice of marvelous range and the operatic airs bring out the purity and quality of her voice in a remarkable manner, more so perhaps over radio than in any other way," reported a Los Angeles Times writer in 1928.

Sugimachi performed and studied in Italy from 1928 to 1931, including a starring role in Madama Butterfly in Milan. She gave a concert in Vancouver in 1930, sang at a Los Angeles reception for Prince and Princess Takematsu in 1931, and starred again as Madame Butterfly in a 1932 Los Angeles and San Francisco productions of the Puccini opera. In 1933 she starred in Sakura, an "opera-pageant" written by her husband, Yaemitsu Sugimachi, and composer Claude Lapham, in its premiere at the Hollywood Bowl. In 1934, she sang at a concert to benefit a Japanese church youth program in Pasadena. She also sang in a production of Sakura in Portland, Oregon, in 1936. Also in 1936, she was in talks to appear in a film about her own career. She made recordings in Japan in the 1930s. In 1937, she was signed to sing the role of Madame Butterfly at New York's Hippodrome Theatre. She sang the role again in Los Angeles in 1939, directed by Caselotti.

== Personal life ==
In 1925, Miyoshi Natori married Japanese-born journalist Yaemitsu Sugimachi. They divorced in the 1930s; their daughter Mikki died in 1958. Her second husband was Goro Yorita; they married in 1947. She became a naturalized American citizen in 1979. Her second husband died in 1982, and she died in 1983, at the age of 78, in Seattle. There is a tape recording of a 1967 interview with Sugimachi in the University of Washington Libraries special collections.
