= St. Clare of Assisi's Church (Bronx) =

Catholic parish church in New York, US

Coordinates: 40°51′3″N 73°51′24″W

The Church of St. Clare of Assisi
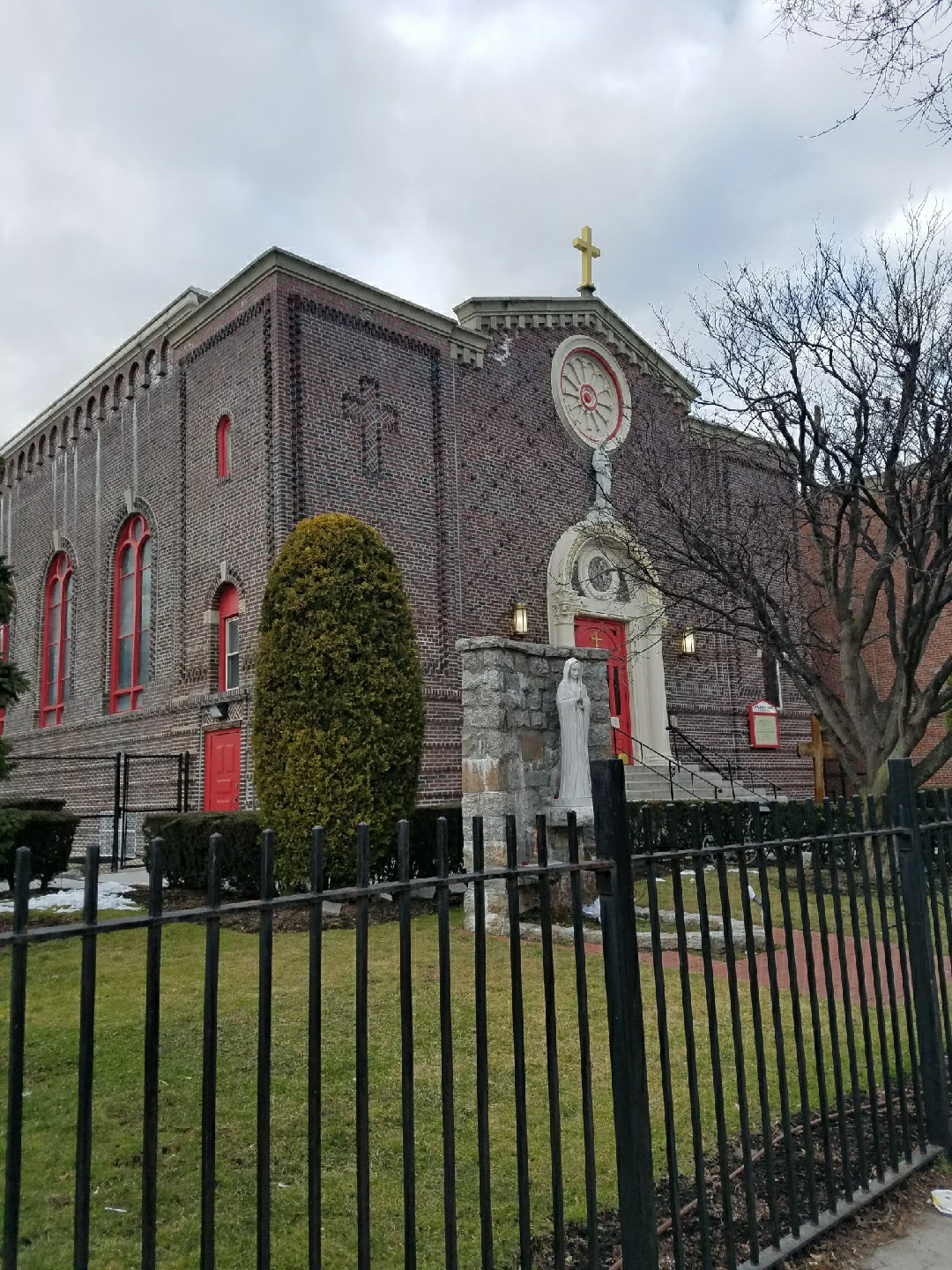
- Church exterior in 2018
- Interactive map of the The Church of St. Clare of Assisi area

General information
- Architectural style: Florentine Romanesque Revival
- Location: Morris Park, The Bronx, New York City, United States
- Construction started: 1929
- Completed: 1930
- Client: Roman Catholic Archdiocese of New York

Technical details
- Structural system: Brick masonry

Design and construction
- Architect: Anthony J. DePace

The Church of St. Clare of Assisi is a parish church under the authority of the Roman Catholic Archdiocese of New York, located at Hone Avenue at Rhinelander Avenue in The Bronx, New York City. It was established in 1929 as a national parish for the Italian American community "at Paulding and Rhinelander Avenue, Morris Park or Williamsbridge."

== Buildings ==
The church was built between 1929 and 1930 to the designs of Anthony J. DePace. "The rectory address is 1918 Paulding Ave., Bronx, NY 10462. The parish school is located at 1911 Hone Avenue, Bronx NY 10461. The school and rectory are back-to-back on parallel avenues (Hone and Paulding), but they seem to be in different zip codes or post office branches. With more than 500 students, the school appears to have two sections per grade."
