= St. Emeric Church (New York City) =

Former Catholic church in New York City

Coordinates: 40°43′36.81″N 73°58′29.03″W

St. Emeric's Church
- Interactive map of the St. Emeric's Church area

General information
- Architectural style: Modernist brick box
- Location: New York City, United States
- Construction started: 1949, 1952
- Completed: 1950
- Client: Roman Catholic Archdiocese of New York

Technical details
- Structural system: Brick masonry

Design and construction
- Architect: Voorhees, Walker, Foley & Smith of 101 Park Ave.

Church of St. Emeric was a Roman Catholic parish church in the Roman Catholic Archdiocese of New York, located at Avenue D, between 12th Street and 13th Street, Manhattan, New York City. The address is 740 East 13th Street. When restoration was completed on St. Brigid's on Avenue B in 2013, the Church of St. Emeric was closed and the parishes merged to form the parish of St. Brigid–St. Emeric.

== History ==
The parish was established in 1949 in anticipation of an increased population in the area due to development of the Jacob Riis Houses and Stuyvesant Town. The Rev. V. J. Brosman had a brick church built in 1949 to designs by Voorhees, Walker, Foley & Smith of 101 Park Ave. for $300,000. The cornerstone was laid in 1950. The church became covered in ivy. A two-storey school building was erected in 1952 to designs by the same architects for $240,000. The property was sold in 2024 for demolition and residential construction.
