= Mount Ambrose =

Coordinates: 50.245°N 5.213°W

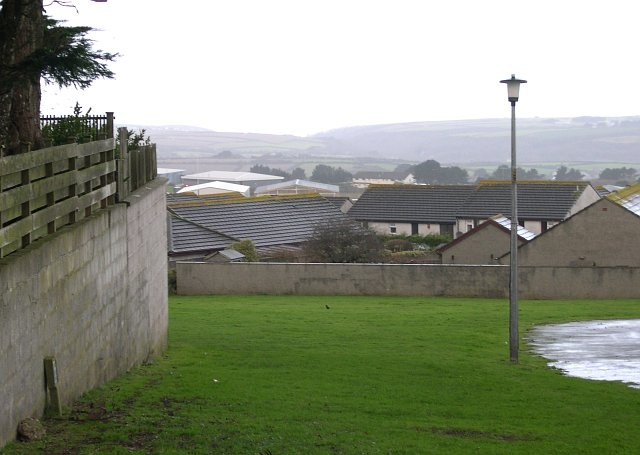

- Location within Cornwall
- OS grid reference: SW7107
- Civil parish: Redruth
- Unitary authority: Cornwall
- Ceremonial county: Cornwall
- Region: South West
- Country: England
- Sovereign state: United Kingdom
- Post town: Redruth
- Postcode district: TR15
- Dialling code: 01209
- Police: Devon and Cornwall
- Fire: Cornwall
- Ambulance: South Western
- UK Parliament: Camborne and Redruth

Mount Ambrose is a northeastern suburb of Redruth in west Cornwall, England. It falls within Redruth Central division on Cornwall Council,

The suburb is 385 kilometres (239 mi) west from the centre of London, 12 kilometres (7.5 mi) west from the centre of Truro, 19 kilometres (12 mi) east from the centre of St Ives, Cornwall and 21 kilometres (13 mi) southwest from the centre of Newquay.

== Recreation ==
- Cricket
  - Mount Ambrose Cricket Club : notable player Andy Hulme
- Football
  - Mount Ambrose FC
- Darts
  - Mount Ambrose Darts
- Table Tennis
  - Mount Ambrose Table Tennis Club
