= St. Ambrose Cathedral =

St. Ambrose Cathedral may refer to:

- St. Ambrose Cathedral, Linares, Chile
- St. Ambrose Cathedral (Des Moines, Iowa), United States

== See also ==
- St. Ambrose Church (disambiguation)
