= List of schools in the Roman Catholic Diocese of Metuchen =

List of schools of the Roman Catholic Diocese of Metuchen.

== High schools ==
- St. Thomas Aquinas High School (formerly Bishop George Ahr High School), Edison
- Immaculata High School, Somerville
- Mount St. Mary Academy, Watchung
- St. Joseph High School, Metuchen (independent)

== Elementary and junior high schools ==
- Immaculate Conception School (Annandale)
- Immaculate Conception School (Somerville)
- Immaculate Conception School (Spotswood)
- Our Lady of Victories School (Sayreville)
- Saints Philip & James School (Phillipsburg)
- School of St. Elizabeth (Bernardsville)
- St. Ambrose School (Old Bridge)
- St. Ann Classical Academy (Raritan) - The first Catholic classical school in the Diocese of Metuchen.
- St. Augustine of Canterbury School (Kendall Park) - 2016 National Blue Ribbon School of Excellence
- St. Bartholomew School (East Brunswick)
- St. Francis Cathedral School (Metuchen) - 2017 National Blue Ribbon School of Excellence
- St. Helena School (Edison)
- St. James School (Basking Ridge) - Recognized as a Blue Ribbon School of Excellence in 2024
- St. James School and Childcare Center (Woodbridge) - After Our Lady of Peace closed in 2014, St. James agreed to accept the OLP students and allow them to wear their legacy school uniforms. There were 265 students in the 2013-2014 school year, and prior to the announcement of OLP's closure, there were 201 students who agreed to attend St. James for 2014-2015.
- St. John Vianney School (Colonia)
- St. Joseph School (Carteret)
- St. Matthew School (Edison)
- St. Matthias School (Somerset) - It opened circa 1966
- St. Stanislaus Kostka School (Sayreville)
- St. Thomas the Apostle School (Old Bridge)

Independent and preschools

- Assumption Catholic School (Perth Amboy)
- Holy Savior Academy (South Plainfield) - Formed from a merger of Holy Family Academy, Our Lady of Fatima School, Our Lady of Mount Virgin School, and Sacred Heart School of South Plainfield.
- Little Friends of Jesus Nursery School (Martinsville)
- Perth Amboy Catholic School (Interparochial) (Perth Amboy) - Includes primary school and upper school divisions

== Closed schools ==
From 2009 to 2014 the archdiocese closed ten schools.

High schools

- St. Pius X High School, Piscataway (closed 1990)
- St. Peter the Apostle High School, New Brunswick (closed 2007)
- Cardinal McCarrick High School (later Cardinal McCarrick/St Mary High School), South Amboy (merged into Raritan Bay Catholic in 2013, closed 2015)

K-8 schools

- Christ the King School (Manville) - From 2010-2015 the congregation spent $1 million to fund the school. The school determined that 250 would be a minimally optimal enrollment but in 2015 it had 125 students. It closed in 2015
- Corpus Christi School (South River)
- Holy Family Academy (Bound Brook) - Merged into Holy Savior Academy
- Msgr. George Everitt Academy (Peapack)
- Our Lady of Fatima School (Piscataway) - Merged into Holy Savior Academy
- Our Lady of Lourdes School (Milltown)
- Our Lady of Mount Virgin School (Middlesex) - Merged into Holy Savior Academy
- Our Lady of Peace School (Fords, Woodbridge) - It had 161 students for the 2013-2014 school year, and for the 2014-2015 school year prospective enrollment was 60% of the previous enrollment as it would have had 97 students. Instead it closed in 2014.
- Sacred Heart School (South Plainfield) - Merged into Holy Savior Academy
- Sacred Heart Elementary School (South Amboy) - It opened in the church's first floor in 1895; the building had been built recently. It moved to another building in July 2012. It merged into Raritan Bay Catholic in 2013, and closed in 2016.
- St. Cecilia School (Iselin, Woodbridge)
- St. Frances Cabrini School (Piscataway)
- St. Joseph Catholic School (North Plainfield)
- St. Mary School (Hackettstown)
- St. Mary and St. Peter Academy (New Brunswick)
