= St. Theresa of the Infant Jesus Church (Bronx) =

Catholic parish church in New York, US

Coordinates: 40°50′59.26″N 73°50′0.11″W

The Church of St. Theresa of the Infant Jesus
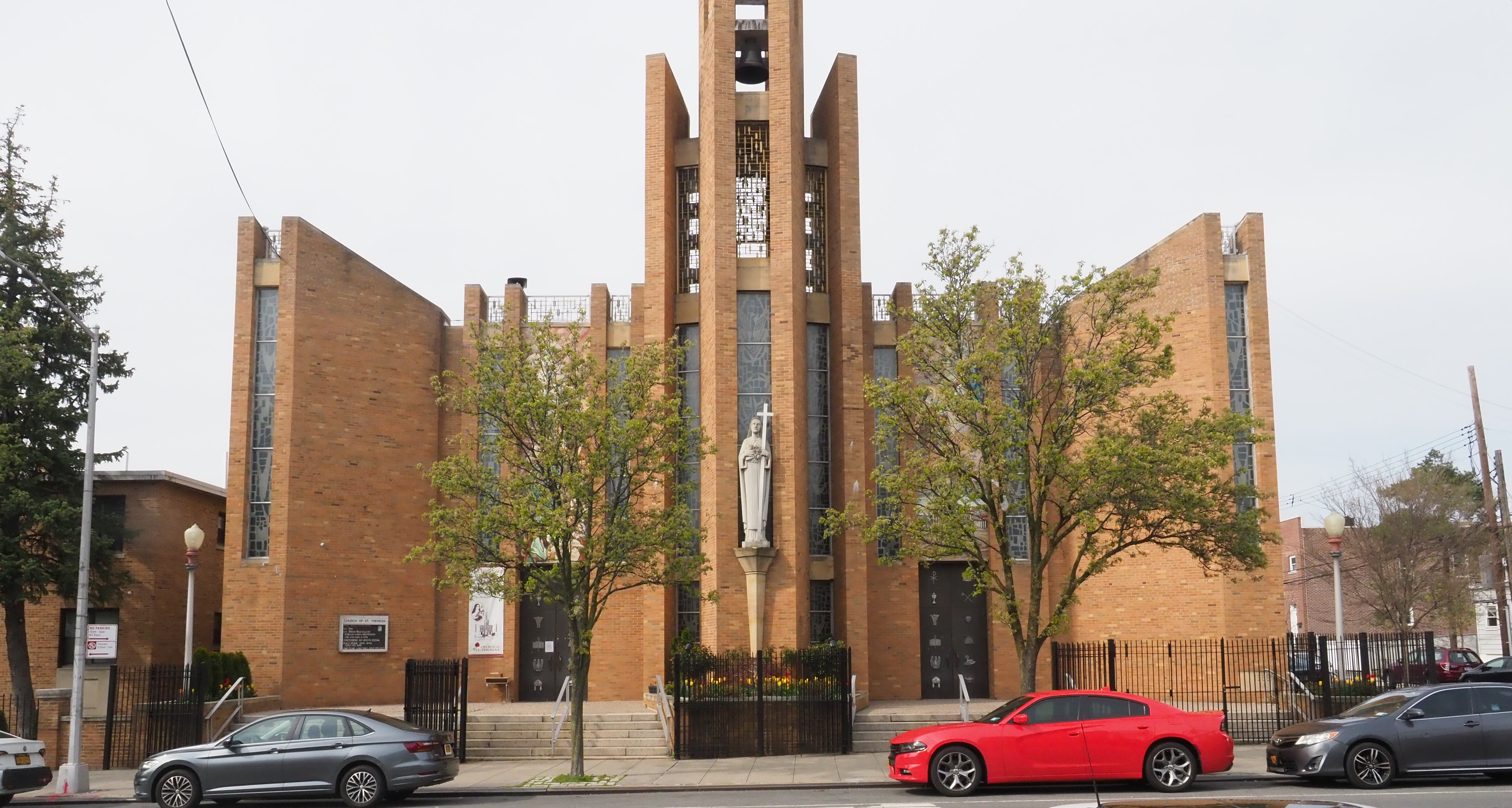
- Interactive map of the The Church of St. Theresa of the Infant Jesus area

General information
- Location: Bronx, New York City, United States of America
- Construction started: 1929
- Completed: 1930, 1970 (rebuilt to new designs)
- Demolished: c.1969 (fire)
- Client: Roman Catholic Archdiocese of New York

Design and construction
- Architect: Anthony J. DePace

The Church of St. Theresa of the Infant Jesus is a Roman Catholic parish church under the authority of the Roman Catholic Archdiocese of New York, located at 2855 St. Theresa Avenue, Bronx, New York City. It was established in 1927.

The plans for the first church for this congregation was drawn up and built 1930 by architect Anthony J. DePace, a Bronx resident who designed many buildings for Catholic clients throughout the Northeastern United States. When the church was destroyed by fire around 1970 it was rebuilt in a modern style by DePace.

The parish also has a school, which was originally run by the Dominican Sisters of Sparkill. Principals included: Sr. Mary Bernard, OP, Sr. Theresa Francis, OP, Elaine F. Ludwig, Anne Gevlin and Josephine Fannelli.

The church holds an annual Summer Feast with activities and events.

== Priests ==
- Monsignor Bonaventure J. Filitti (opening until 1946)
- Fr. Mario J. Ponsiglione (1946-1974)
- Msgr. Mazziotta (1974-1980)
- Msgr. John Guido (1980-1991)
- Fr. Robert Grippo (1991-2014)
- Msgr. Thomas Derivan (2014- )
