= St. Emery Church (Fairfield, Connecticut) =

Coordinates: 41.1683°N 73.2325°W

- St. Emery Church
- Location: 838 Kings Highway East; Fairfield, Connecticut
- Country: United States
- Denomination: Roman Catholic

Architecture
- Architect: Anthony J. DePace

Administration
- Province: Hartford
- Diocese: Bridgeport

Clergy
- Bishop: Most Rev. Frank Caggiano

St. Emery is a Roman Catholic church in Fairfield, Connecticut, part of the Diocese of Bridgeport.

The parish, which is dedicated to St. Emeric (Emery) of Hungary, was formed in 1932 to serve Fairfield's growing Hungarian population. In 1971, the parish of St. Stephen in Bridgeport was merged into the parish of St. Emery. St. Stephen's Church of Bridgeport, which was founded in 1897, was the second Hungarian Catholic church to be formed in the United States.

The Romanesque Revival church building was designed by noted church architect Anthony J. DePace of New York.
