= American Architects Directory =

1956 architect directory

The American Architects Directory is a directory of American architects registered with the American Institute of Architects. It was published by R. R. Bowker LLC. The first edition was published in 1956, second edition in 1962, and third edition in 1970.

== See also ==
- American Institute of Architects
