= Holy Rosary Church (Bridgeport, Connecticut) =

- Church of Our Lady of Pompeii of the Holy Rosary
- Location: 365 E. Washington Avenue, Bridgeport, Connecticut
- Country: United States
- Denomination: Roman Catholic

Architecture
- Architect: Anthony J. DePace of DePace & Juster

Administration
- Province: Hartford
- Diocese: Bridgeport

Clergy
- Bishop: Most Rev. William E. Lori

- Holy Rosary Church
- U.S. Historic district – Contributing property
- Built: 1930
- Architect: Anthony J. DePace
- Architectural style: Romanesque Revival
- Part of: East Bridgeport Historic District (ID79002659)
- Designated CP: April 25, 1979

Holy Rosary Church in Bridgeport was a Catholic Church in Diocese of Bridgeport. It was permanently closed by the diocese in 2011. As of 2025, the building is owned by Shekinah Free Methodist Center.

== History ==
Formally known as Our Lady of Pompeii of the Holy Rosary, the Romanesque Revival-style church was built 1930 to the designs by the Brooklyn architect Anthony J. DePace of DePace & Juster to serve an originally Italian congregation on Bridgeport's East Side.

Holy Rosary Church is listed as a significant contributing property of the East Bridgeport National Register District.
