= DePace & Juster =

DePace & Juster was an architectural firm established in 1923 by architects Anthony DePace and Samuel Juster, who met while working at the firm of Alfred C. Bossom in the late 1910s. Juster left Bossom and DePace left the firm of Cass Gilbert in 1923 to create the partnership, which had a number of commissions for schools, places of worship, institutions and hospitals from Roman Catholic and Jewish clients. DePace was responsible for the Catholic commissions and Juster worked on those for Jewish clients. The firm ceased activities during the Great Depression in the 1930s. The firm continued in practice until 1947 when the partnership was dissolved. Juster claimed in 1956 that the practice was established in 1925 and disestablished in 1948.
