= Our Lady of Victory (disambiguation) =

Our Lady of Victory or Our Lady of Victories is one of several titles for the Blessed Virgin Mary, discussed at Our Lady of the Rosary.

It also may refer to:

== Churches ==
=== Canada ===
- Notre-Dame-des-Victoires, Quebec City, Quebec
- Our Lady of Victory Church (Inuvik), also called the "Igloo Church", Northwest Territories

=== Italy ===
- Santa Maria della Vittoria, PP
- Santa Maria della Vittoria, Rome

=== Malta ===
- Church of Our Lady of Victory, Valletta
- Our Lady of Victories Parish Church, Senglea

=== United States ===
- St. Mary of Victories Church, St. Louis, Missouri
- Our Lady of Victory Basilica (Lackawanna, New York)
- Our Lady of Victory Church (Bronx, New York)
- Our Lady of Victory Church (Brooklyn, New York)
- Our Lady of Victory Church (Manhattan), New York, also called the "War Memorial Church"
- Our Lady of Victory Roman Catholic Church, Rochester, New York
- Our Lady of Victory (Cincinnati), Delhi Township, Ohio
- Notre-Dame-des-Victoires, San Francisco, California

=== Other countries ===
- Church of Our Lady of Victories, Bowen Hills, Queensland, Australia
- Our Lady of Victories Basilica, Camberwell, Victoria, Australia
- Church of Our Lady of Victories at the Sablon, Brussels, Belgium
- Church of Our Lady of Victory, Salvador, Brazil
- Church of Our Lady Victorious, Prague, Czech Republic
- Our Lady of Victories Church, Kolar district, Karnataka, India
- Notre-Dame-des-Victoires, Paris, France
- St Mary, Our Lady of Victories Church, Dundee, Scotland, UK
- Our Lady of Victory Church, Tianjin, China
- Our Lady of Victories Church, Christchurch, New Zealand
- Our Lady of Victories Church, Glasnevin, Dublin, Ireland

== Schools ==
- Our Lady of Victory Academy, Dobbs Ferry, New York, U.S.
- Our Lady of Victory Academy (Fort Worth, Texas), U.S.
- Our Lady of Victory Catholic School, Toronto, Ontario, Canada
- Nolan Catholic High School, formerly named Our Lady of Victory High School, in Fort Worth, Texas, U.S.

== Other ==
- Derham Hall and Our Lady of Victory Chapel, College of Saint Catherine, St. Paul, Minnesota
- Our Lady of Victory (film), an alternate title for the film The Mighty Macs
- Franciscan Sisters of Our Lady of Victory
- Original name for the feast of Our Lady of the Rosary
- Alternative name for the Soldiers' and Sailors' Monument in Portland, Maine, U.S.

== See also ==
- Our Lady of Victory Cathedral (disambiguation)
