= Our Lady of Victory Church (Bronx) =

Roman Catholic parish church in New York City, USA

Coordinates: 40°50′18.9″N 73°54′20.1″W

The Church of Our Lady of Victory
- Interactive map of the The Church of Our Lady of Victory area

General information
- Architectural style: Romanesque Revival
- Location: Tremont, Bronx, New York City, United States of America
- Client: Roman Catholic Archdiocese of New York

Design and construction
- Architect: John Vredenburgh Van Pelt

The Church of Our Lady of Victory is a Roman Catholic parish church under the authority of the Roman Catholic Archdiocese of New York, located at Webster Avenue, Tremont, Bronx, New York City. The parish was established in 1909.

== Buildings ==
The church complex consists of a church-and-school and separate rectory. The address is 1512 Webster Avenue, at East 171 Street, a block south of Claremont Parkway. The present dark brown brick Lombardo Romanesque-style church building dates from 1911, apparently providing for a parish school above; the parish does not currently have a parish school but offers a vigorous CCD program. The architect was John Vredenburgh Van Pelt, who designed the similar Guardian Angel Church (Manhattan) in 1930.

== History ==
Reverend Bartholomew J. Galligan formed the parish and said the first mass in a temporary chapel on September 12, 1909. The church and school were opened on December 25, 1911, after construction was completed. The Reverend John F. Quinn was rector at this church until he was transferred to Holy Name of Mary (Montgomery, New York) in 1919 and replaced by the Rev. Thomas B. Brown.

The parish of St. Augustine merged with Our Lady of Victory to form the parish of St. Augustine - Our Lady of Victory. St. Augustine's was closed in 2011 and demolished in 2013.

== Dedication ==
The church's "Victory" dedication is not clear, it is believed to celebrate the Battle of Lepanto (1571).

There are at least two other Our Lady of Victory Roman Catholic churches in New York City:

- Brooklyn's appears to be the oldest, with the present church building, located at Throop Avenue and McDonough Street, Brooklyn, built 1891-1895 to the designs by Thomas E. Houghton.
- Manhattan's is the most recent, being founded during World War II in 1944 by Francis Cardinal Spellman, Archbishop of New York and Apostolic Vicar for the U.S. Armed Forces; the present church was built 1944-1946 to the designs by the prominent New York City architectural firm of Eggers & Higgins
