= Our Lady of Victory Church (Manhattan) =

Catholic church in New York City

Coordinates: 40°42′25″N 74°00′32″W

The Church of Our Lady of Victory
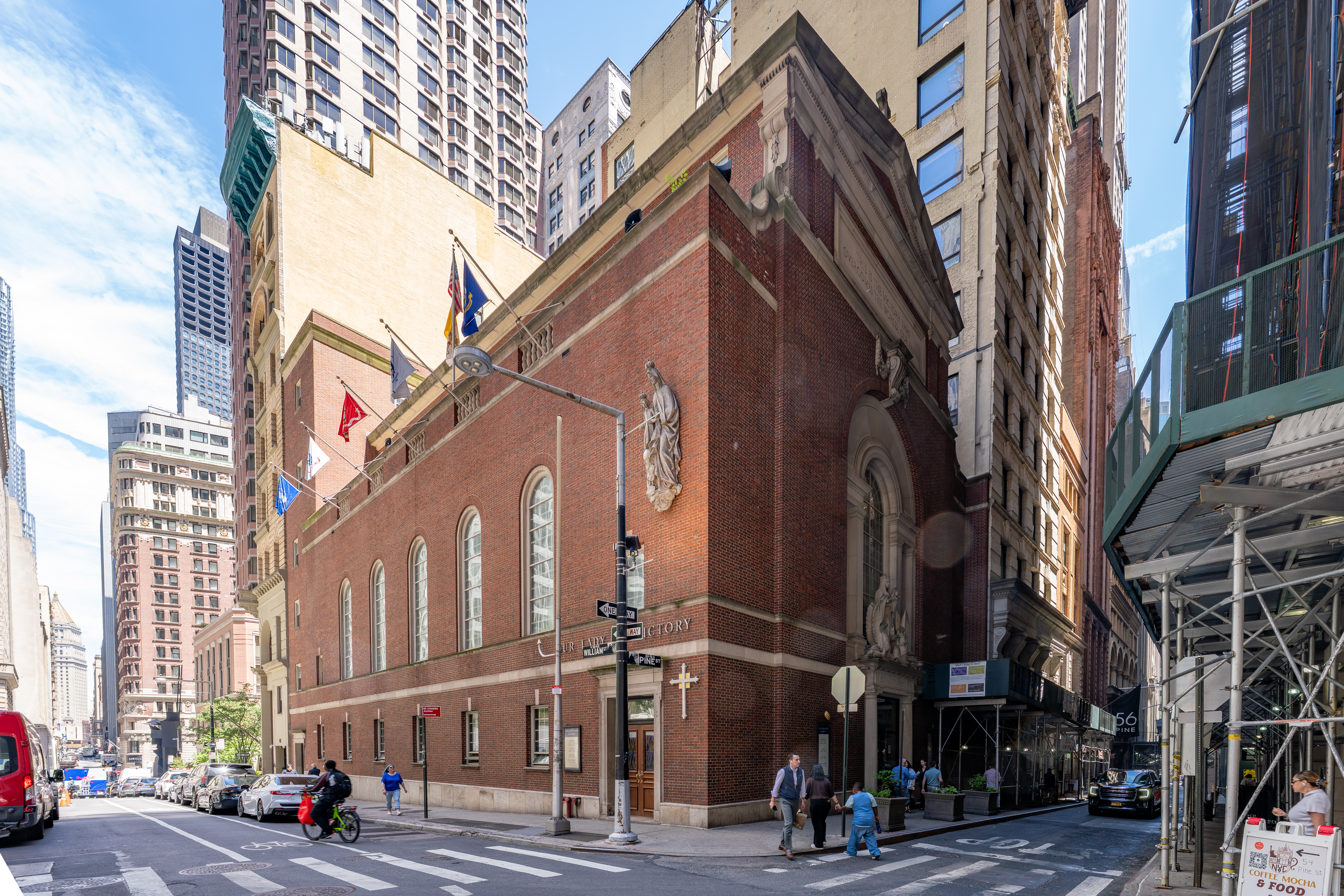
- Front gable, with entrance on broad elevation fronting William Street
- Interactive map of the The Church of Our Lady of Victory area

General information
- Location: New York, New York, United States
- Construction started: 1944
- Completed: 1946
- Cost: $430,000
- Client: Archdiocese of New York

Design and construction
- Architect: Eggers & Higgins of 542 Fifth Avenue

Website
- Our Lady of Victory Church, Manhattan

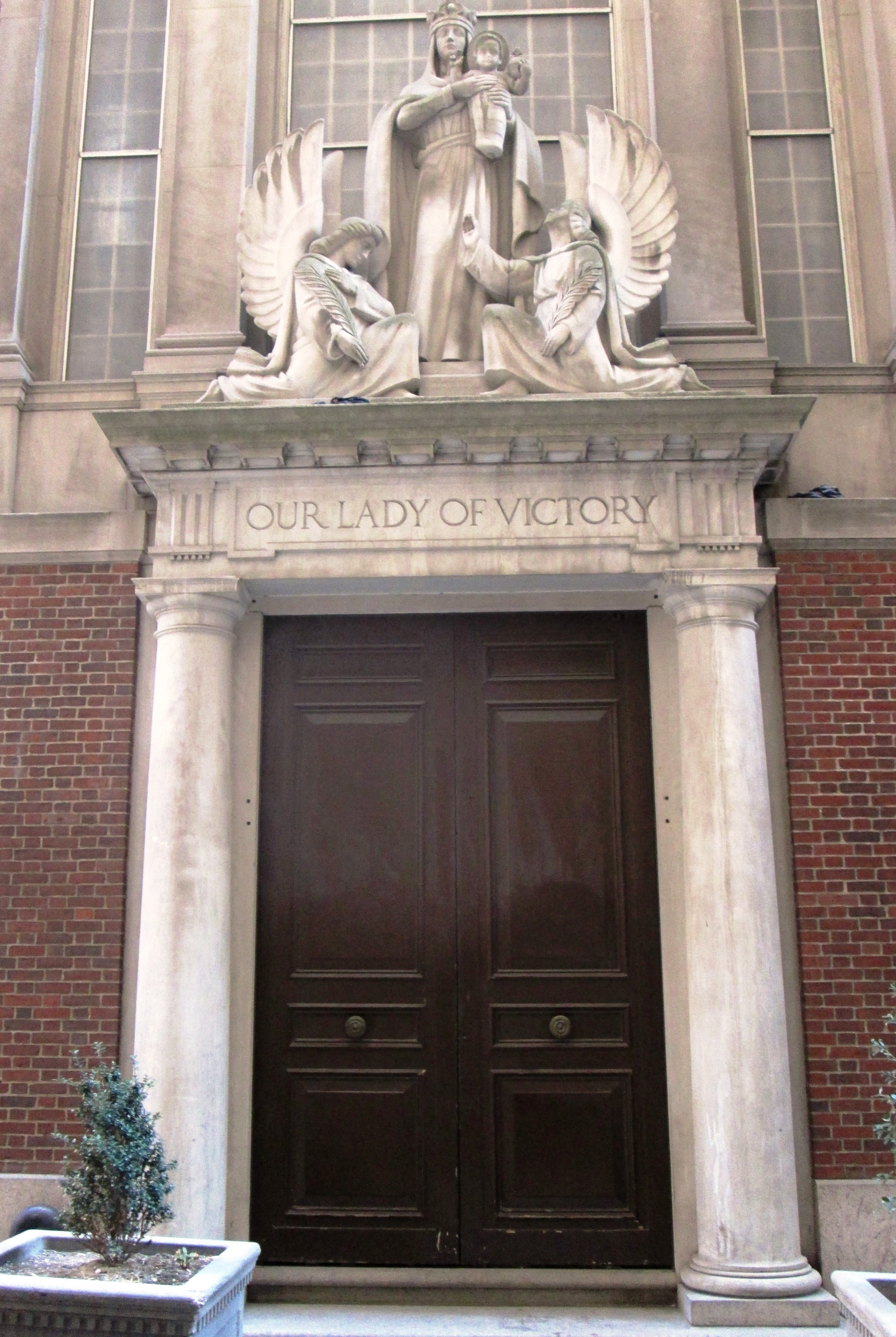
The entrance on Pine Street

The Church of Our Lady of Victory, also known as the War Memorial Church, is a Catholic parish church in the Archdiocese of New York, located at 60 William Street on the northeast corner of William Street and Pine Street in the Financial District of Manhattan, New York City. It was established in 1944, during World War II, by Cardinal Francis Spellman, Archbishop of New York and Apostolic Vicar for the U.S. Armed Forces from December 11, 1939, to December 2, 1967, at a time when "victory in the war was in sight but not yet assured." A quote from Cardinal Spellman greets worshipers at the front door: "This Holy Shrine is dedicated to Our Lady of Victory in Thanksgiving for Victory won by our valiant dead, our soldier’s blood, our country’s tears, shed to defend men’s rights and win back men’s hearts to God."

A Soldier's Shrine is in the lower chapel, and the Teresa Benedicta Auschwitz Memorial in the lobby commemorates a victim of the Holocaust. A September 11th Remembrance Book is displayed.

Today, the church primarily serves as a place for daytime worship, rather than as a neighborhood church.

== History ==
Between 1944 and 1945, the church occupied a temporary premise at 23 William Street. The present brick Georgian Revival church was built in 1944–1946 to the designs by the prominent New York City architectural firm of Eggers & Higgins at a planned cost of $430,000. The land was donated by Major Edward Bowes. The style of the church has also been described as "basilican." Construction was completed in 1946 and the church dedicated by Cardinal Spellman on June 23, 1947.

== Organ ==
The church currently has an organ from c.2010 manufactured by the Allen Organ Company of Macungie, Pennsylvania. An earlier organ was produced for the church by George Kilgen & Son of St. Louis, Missouri in 1955.

== Dedication ==
The church's "Victory" dedication is commemorates the then ongoing actions during the Second World War. There are at least three Our Lady of Victory Roman Catholic churches in New York City. Brooklyn's appears to be the oldest, with the present church building, located at Throop Avenue and McDonough Street, built from 1891–1895 to the design of Thomas E. Houghton. The parish in Tremont, Bronx was established in 1909 and is believed to commemorate the Battle of Lepanto (1571). Manhattan's establishment in 1944 is the most recent.

== Memorials ==
Among the memorials in the church are a number of bronze plaques in the narthex:

- (Above the central aisle door) "This Holy Shrine is dedicated to Our Lady of Victory in Thanksgiving for Victory won by our valiant dead, our soldier’s blood, our country’s tears, shed to defend men’s rights and win back men’s hearts to God." (Archbishop Spellman's dedication speech).
- (To the left of the central aisle door) "War Memorial Church / Our Lady of Victory / In Prayerful Remembrance / of / Right Reverend Monsignor / Richard J. Pigott, P.A. / Born January 22, 1895 / Ordained May 21, 1921 / Died November 17, 1963" (Wall-mounted bronze memorial)
- (To the right of the central aisle door) "The Main Altar of this Church / Donated by / Mr. & Mrs. Christopher J. Devine / In Memory of / The Kirby & Devine Families / Church Dedicated on June 23, 1947 / by / Francis Cardinal Spellman / Archbishop of New York / Rev. Richard J. Pigott, Pastor" (Wall-mounted bronze memorial). Devine was founder and Senior Partner of C.J. Devine & Co. a noted dealer in United States Government securities, who led the funds drive to build the church.
- (Below the above-mentioned Devine Memorial) "The site of this Church / of Our Lady of Victory / Was donated by / Major Edward Bowes / To Francis Cardinal Spellman / Archbishop of New York" (Wall-mounted bronze memorial)
- (To right of William Street Entrance)"The Statue of / Our Lady of Victory / On the William Street / Façade has been / Donated in Memory of / Wallace Gilroy." (Wall-mounted bronze memorial)
- (Below the above-mentioned Gilroy Memorial) "The Carillon / has been donated by / George Doty / in memory of his sister / Josephine Jaburg." (Doty of Goldman Sachs) (Wall-mounted bronze memorial)
- (Far wall opposite William Street entrance) "Teresa Benedicta of the Cross / Her Calvary was Auschwitz / Gift of the Edith Stein Guild / New York, 1978 A.D." (Wall-mounted bronze memorial)
- Stained glass fanlight above Pine Street entrance depicting Downtown New York Skyline with World Trade Center, inscribed "September 11th Year 2001."
