= Notre-Dame-des-Victoires =

Notre-Dame-des-Victoires may refer to:

- the name of Ali Bitchin Mosque, Algiers, between 1843 and 1962
- Notre-Dame-des-Victoires, Paris
- Notre-Dame-des-Victoires, Quebec City
- Notre-Dame-des-Victoires, San Francisco

== See also ==
- Our Lady of Victory (disambiguation)
