= Mary Jane Wilson =

English nun (1840–1916)

Venerable Mary Jane Wilson
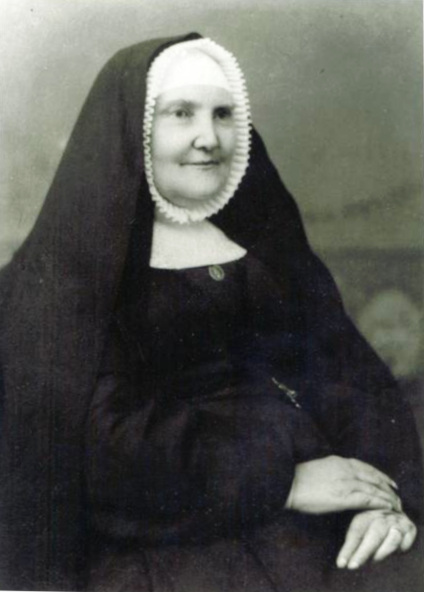
- Born: 3 October 1840; Hurryhur, Mysore, Karnataka, British Raj
- Died: 18 October 1916 (aged 76); Câmara de Lobos, Madeira, Portugal

Mary Jane Wilson DamTE (3 October 1840 – 18 October 1916), also known as Sister Maria of Saint Francis (Portuguese: Irmã Maria de São Francisco), was an Englishwoman born in India who founded the Congregation of the Franciscan Sisters of Our Lady of Victories. Wilson was declared venerable by Pope Francis.

== Early Life ==
Wilson was born in Hurryhur, Mysore to Anglo-Irish parents, her father serving as a Quartermaster and Interpreter to the '32nd Regiment'. This is presumably a reference to the 32nd Regiment of the Bengal Native Infantry, where the Quartermaster / Interpreter's duty was to look after the Indian troops and act as a translator between them and the senior British officers.

Wilson's mother died when she was eight months old and in 1842 Wilson was shipped back to England, with her six-year old brother, to be cared by their mother's sister, Ellen James, and her husband Sir Henry James, at their home in Cornwall. They were brought up up in the Anglican faith.

As Wilson grew up, she became increasingly dissatisfied with the disunity of the Protestant church and attracted to Catholicism. Her interest was fuelled by visits to Europe. In Boulogne she first developed a devotion to Our Lady of Victories. She later recorded in her memorandum-book that "On the 30th April, 1873, I received the gift of Faith." Aged 32, she travelled back to Boulogne by herself and was received into the Catholic Church on 11 May 1873 at the Church of St Alphonsus, Boulogne-sur-Mer, by Father Chierici, who had acted as her spiritual advisor. This was a Redemptorist convent on the Rue Faidherbe, opened in 1860 and designed by the English architect, Charles Hansom. Wilson was confirmed on 8 June, taking the name of saint Francis de Sales. After this, she spent years learning more about her new religion, visiting various confraternities and orders, while also going on pilgrimage to Lourdes and the Holy Land. On return, she decided to devote her life to helping the poor and sick, training as a nurse in Boulogne, Paris and London.

== Madeira ==
In 1881, aged 40, Wilson moved to Madeira, in Portugal, to pursue her vocation. On her passage she nursed a young invalid Englishwoman and after arriving in Funchal she worked initially as a private nurse.

Having observed the lack of religious training among the common people, Wilson opened a Sunday school in Torreão in 1883 (now Adegas do Torreão), Funchal, where she also started giving food and shelter to abandoned children and orphans. From there, her activities expanded to other parts of Funchal and its outlying communities, such as Monte. Drawing on her medical training and with an increasing band of followers and supporters, she became known as "The lady with the black cloak and travelling pharmacy". She established more schools in and around Funchal, including St George's High School. This later transferred to Santa Cruz, where Wilson moved in 1884. She also established an orphanage, which provided critical relief during a famine in 1888. Wilson proved adept at fundraising, attracting support and patronage from both local people and visitors to the island.

== The Congregation ==
On her conversion in 1873, Wilson had joined the Third Order of St. Francis. After arriving in Madeira and commencing her mission, she came to feel that she and her followers would better achieve their aims as part of a unified religious community. To that end, on 15 January 1884 she co-founded, with Amélia Amaro de Sá, the Congregation of the Franciscan Sisters of Our Lady of Victories (FNSV, in Portuguese: Congregação das Irmãs Franciscanas de Nossa Senhora das Vitórias). This received the official sanction of the local bishop, being known externally as the Sisters of St. Francis of Funchal. They adopted a habit consisting of a black dress and white veil, covering their hair. In 1891 they held the first public professions and Wilson took the name Sister Mary Francis. They continued to expand the area of their activities, albeit Wilson struggled to recruit sisters from abroad with formal nursing qualifications.

The rules of the order were quite strict, with high standards expected of both the Mother Superiors of the Congregation's houses and the sisters. The Congregation and its activities expanded during the 1890s and 1900s, including the provision of an isolation ward for Smallpox victims during an outbreak in 1907, which Wilson ran personally. For this she was awarded the honour of Tower and Sword (Torre e Espada) by the King of Portugal, Carlos I.

== Final years ==
Following the 5 October 1910 revolution and the establishment of the First Portuguese Republic, many religious houses in Portugal were closed down. Wilson was forced her to leave Madeira, returning to England, where she lived with her sister. A year later she was granted permission to return, as the government's anti-clerical policies began to moderate.

Wilson arrived back in Madeira on 11 November 1911, picking up and further developing her Congregation and its work. She died suddenly in Madeira on 18 October 1916, while working on the opening of a new preparatory school for boys at Câmara de Lobos. She was 76 years old. In 1939 her remains were transferred to the Mother House of the Congregation in Quinta das Rosas, Madeira.

After Wilson's death, the co-founder of the Congregation, Sister Amélia Amaro de Sá, became its head. The Congregation survived and expanded over the following decades. By 1950 there were fifty-two houses, spread across Europe. Since then it has opened houses in many other parts of the world, including Wilson's birthplace of India.

== Commemoration ==
On 9 October 2013, Wilson was declared venerable by Pope Francis. This is the first step on the road to sainthood, which can be followed by beatification and canonisation.

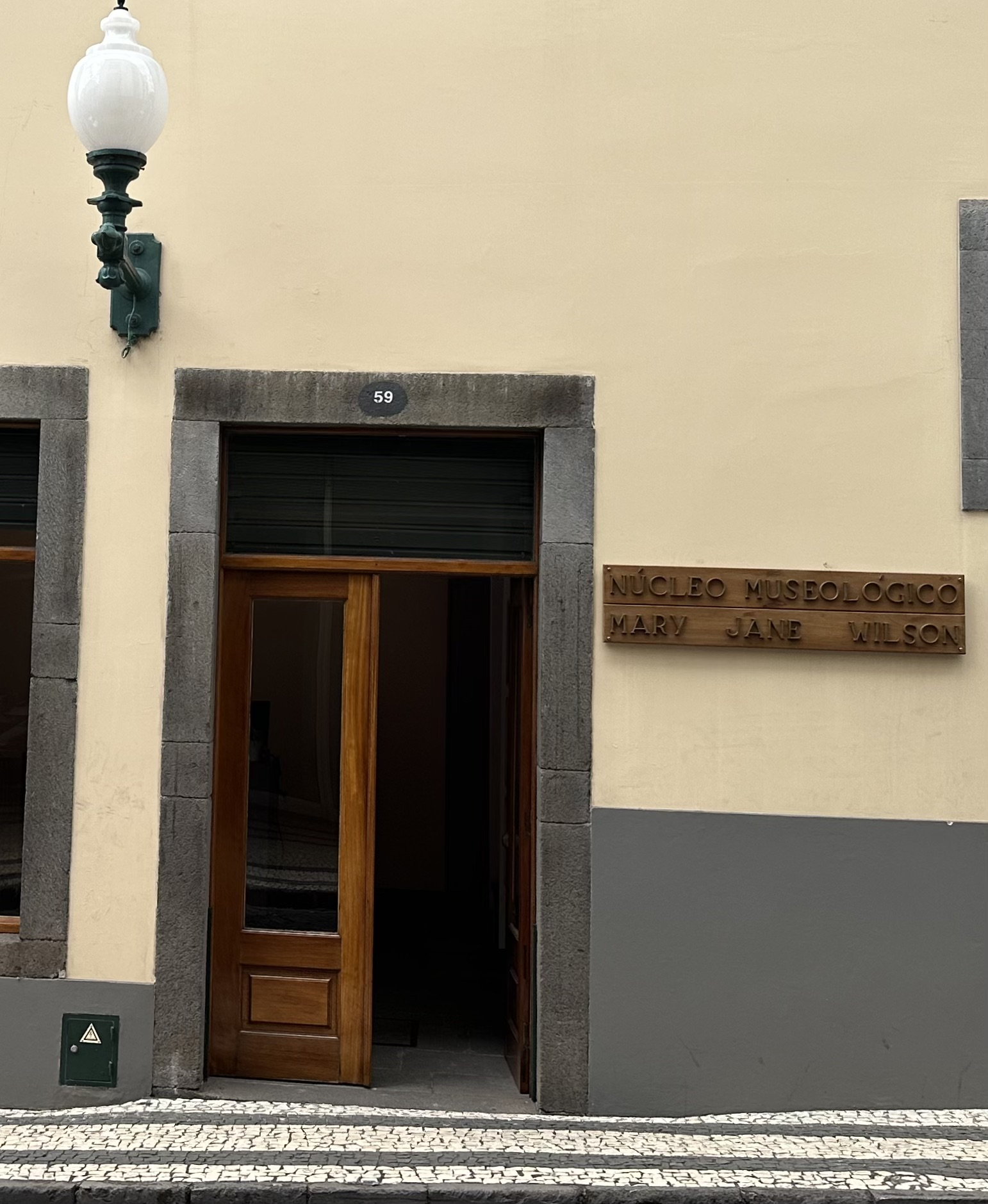
Entrance to Mary Jane Wilson Museum Centre, Rua do Carmo, Funchal

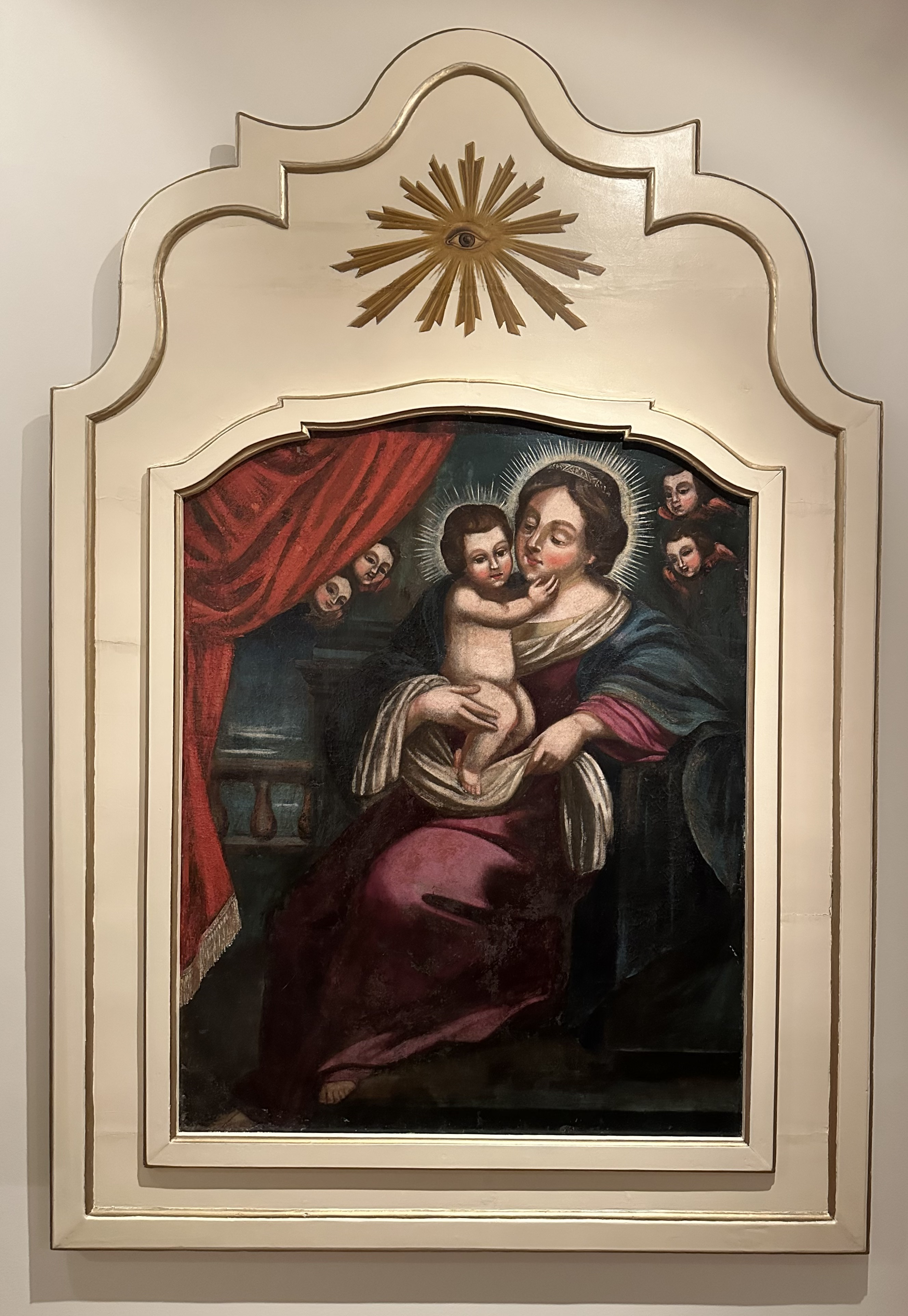
Personal devotional painting of 'Divine Providence' inherited by Wilson, now on display in the Mary Jane Wilson Museum Centre

There is a devotional museum in Funchal dedicated to Wilson's life and work 'Mary Jane Wilson Museum Centre'. This includes many objects associated with her life, such as an 18th-century painting of Divine Providence, inherited from her family, with the Eye of Providence above it. This was the origin of Wilson's favourite saying: "God sees everything".

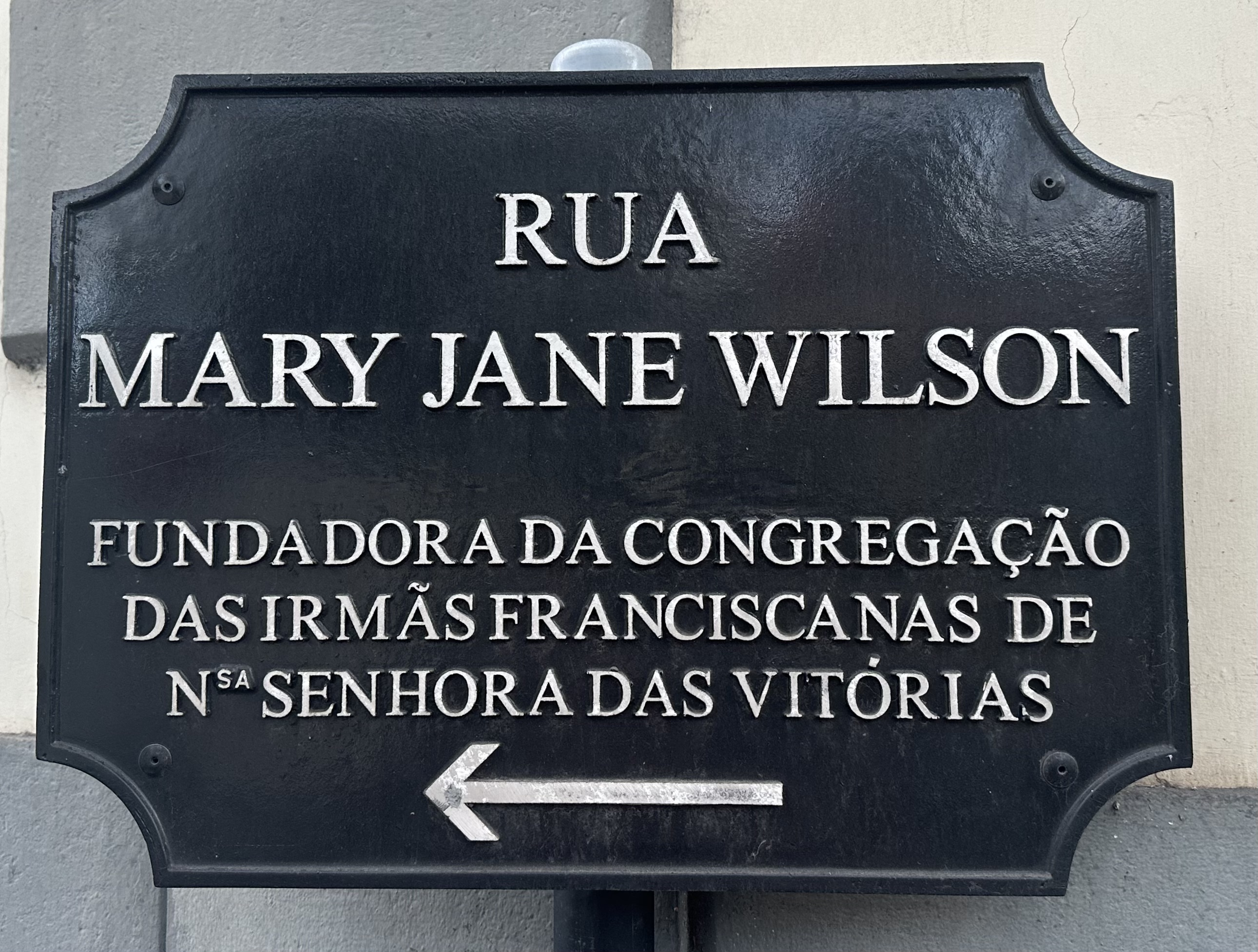
Street named after Mary Jane Wilson

The street Rua Mary Jane Wilson, near the museum, is named after her. In Largo Severiano Ferraz, also in Funchal, there is a bronze statue of Wilson, sculpted in 2006 by Ricardo Velosa. A sculpture of her, by Luís Paixão, is in the municipal gardens in Santa Cruz.

In about 1950, the Franciscan Sisters of Our Lady of Victories published a 32-page biography of Wilson by Terry Dunphy: The Invincible Victorian: the Life of Mary Jane Wilson. Even at this time there was apparently a belief that Wilson might be canonized, the booklet ending with a request that:

Details of favours granted through the intercession of Mary Jane Wilson will be gratefully received by: The Reverend Superior, Quinta Das Rosas, Rua Do Carmo 61, Funchal, Madeira, Portugal.

== Honours ==
- Dame of Order of Tower and Sword, Portugal (1907)
