= Church of St. John Nepomucene =

Roman Catholic parish church in Manhattan, New York City, USA

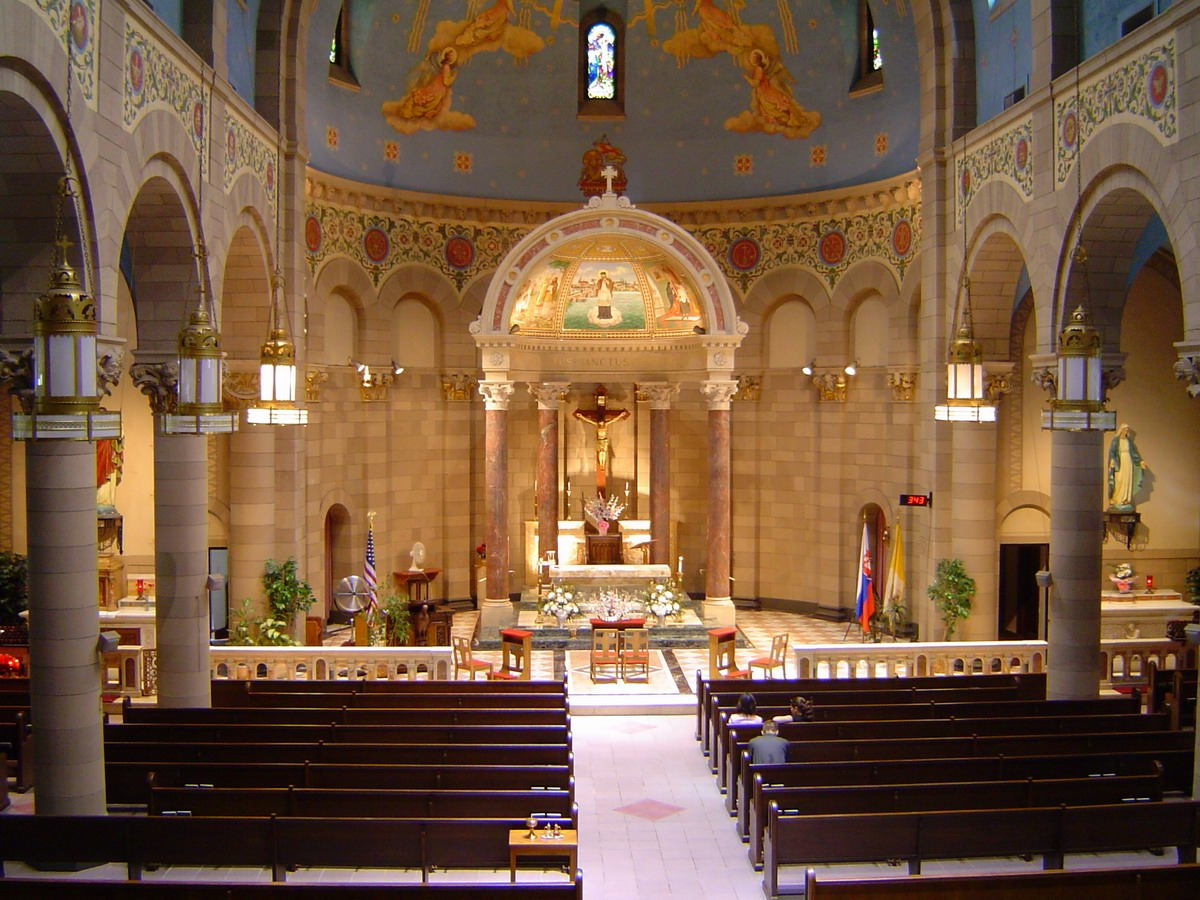

Religion
- Affiliation: Roman Catholic
- Province: New York

Location
- Location: 411 East 66th Street, Upper East Side, New York, NY, USA
- State: New York
- Interactive map of Church of St. John Nepomucene
- Coordinates: 40.764005°N 73.95847°W

Architecture
- Architect: John V. Van Pelt
- Type: Church, school and rectory
- Style: Romanesque Revival

The Church of St. John Nepomucene
- (2026)
- Interactive map of the The Church of St. John Nepomucene area

General information
- Architectural style: Romanesque Revival
- Location: Upper East Side, New York, NY, USA, United States of America
- Cost: $300,000 (for church, school, and rectory)
- Client: Roman Catholic Archdiocese of New York

Design and construction
- Architect: John V. Van Pelt

The Church of St. John Nepomucene is a Roman Catholic parish located on East 66th Street and 1st Avenue in Manhattan, New York City. The founders of the church were recent immigrants from Slovakia, who began meeting in St. Brigid's Parish at 8th Street and Avenue B in about 1891 and established the Society of St. Matthew to organize their own parish.

The parish was established in 1895 from within St. Elizabeth of Hungary parish, which was centered on its church on 83rd Street. The church, school and rectory were built for $300,000.

== See also ==
- St. John Nepomucene
