= Holy Rosary Church (Manhattan) =

Former Catholic parish church in Manhattan, New York

Coordinates: 40.7973°N 73.9326°W

- Church of the Holy Rosary of the Blessed Virgin Mary
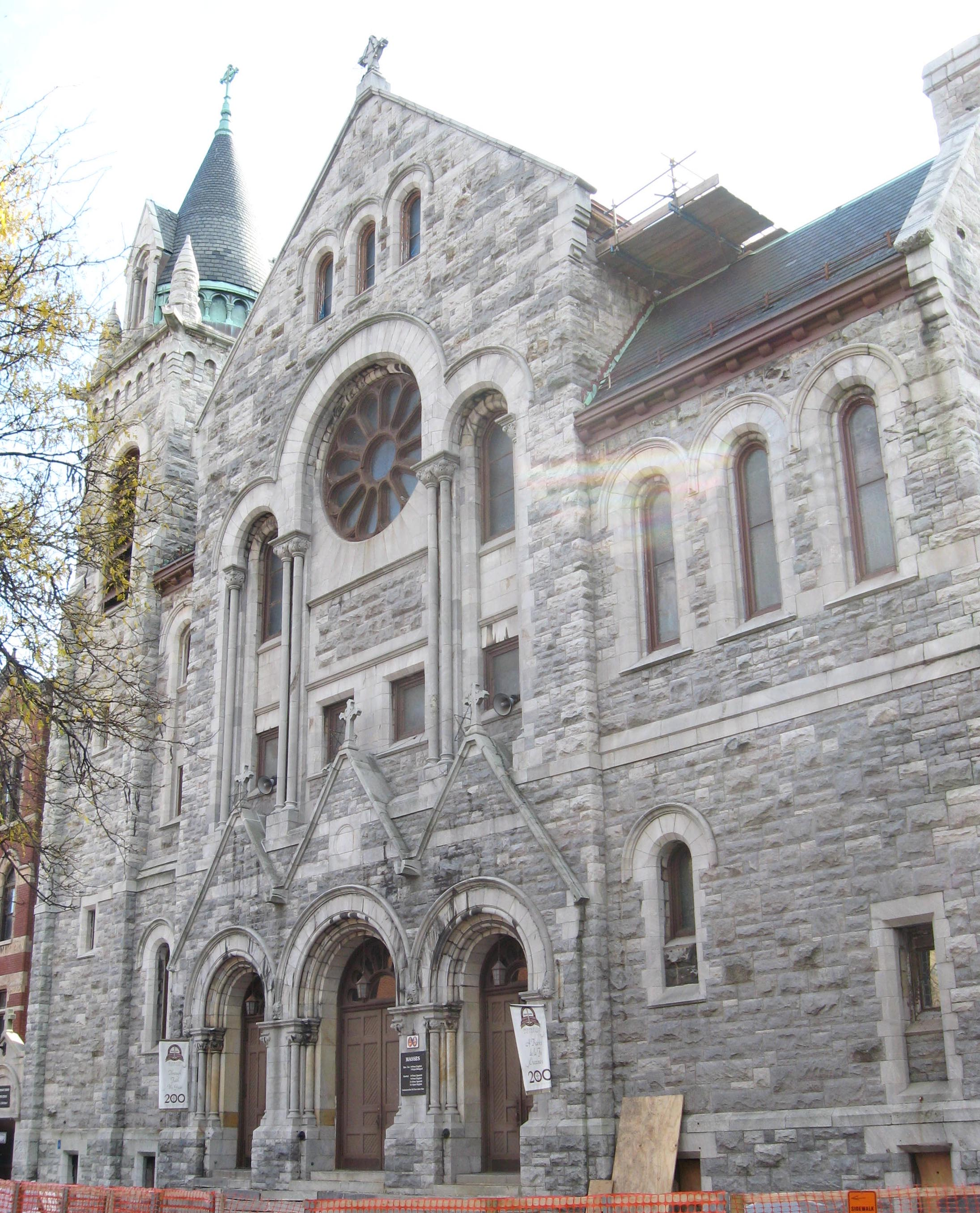
- The facade of Holy Rosary Church
- Holy Rosary Church
- Location: East Harlem, Manhattan, New York
- Address: 444 East 119th Street
- Country: United States
- Denomination: Catholic
- Religious order: Order of St. Augustine (1972-2015)

History
- Founded: 1884
- Founder: The Rev. Joseph A. Byron
- Dedication: Our Lady of the Rosary
- Dedicated: (First church) October 5, 1884; (Second church) February 11, 1900
- Events: Deconsecration June 30, 2017

Architecture
- Functional status: Closed
- Architect: Thomas Houghton (for church)
- Style: Romanesque Revival
- Years built: (First church) Summer 1894; (Second church) October 1898
- Closed: 2015
- Demolished: (First church) Summer 1898

Specifications
- Materials: Masonry

Administration
- Archdiocese: New York

The Church of the Holy Rosary of the Blessed Virgin Mary was a Catholic parish church of the Archdiocese of New York located at 444 East 119th Street, in the East Harlem neighborhood of Manhattan in New York City.

In November 2014, the archdiocese announced that Holy Rosary was one of 31 parishes which would be merged into others. It was merged with the Parish of St. Paul, based at 113 East 117th Street, and the church ceased to operate in 2015. The church was deconsecrated on June 30, 2017.

== Parish history ==
The parish was established in 1884 by Joseph A. Byron under the direction of John McCloskey, Cardinal, Archbishop of New York, for the Germans and Irish of the newly developed neighborhood to the east of Third Avenue near the East River. The area had been served by St. Paul's Church on East 117th Street and by St. Cecilia's on East 106th Street. Since both older parishes were some distance from the newer settlement along the river, it was inevitable that the rapidly developing area would see the founding of two ethnic churches: Our Lady of Mt. Carmel on 115th St. for the Italians and Our Lady of the Holy Rosary on East 119th St. for the Germans and the Irish.

The new parish was placed under the patronage of Our Lady of the Holy Rosary. A 35-year-old New Yorker, Joseph A. Byron, was appointed as first pastor with neither a church nor a rectory. He conducted a door-to-door census of his prospective parishioners seeking their support for his plan to create a church of their own. In March 1884, he purchased four lots on East 119th Street, between First and Pleasant Avenues, where the present parish buildings stand.

Michael Corrigan, Coadjutor Archbishop of New York, presided over the dedication of the new church on Rosary Sunday, October 5, 1884. The address previously listed in older records for the same church building was 442 E 119th Street.

Byron and his two assistants, Charles A. Meridith and James T. McGovern, lived in a rented house at 365 Pleasant Avenue until the completion of the present rectory. On March 29, 1893, Byron, 44, died from a cold caught during the building of the new rectory. Francis H. Wall, another native New Yorker, assumed the pastorship of Holy Rosary in 1894. He encouraged the establishment of Rosary Society, Sacred Heart League, Holy Name Society, St. Vincent de Paul and Young Men's Lyceum.

The year 1898 saw the rise of the present stone church that Corrigan dedicated on Feb. 11, 1900. Sports became part of parish life, and the Boys Club was set up in 1903. When William J. Guinan succeeded Wall in 1909, he established a training course for CCD teachers. Thomas F. Kane became pastor in 1916. He got the support of the Pallotine Sisters who had begun in 1908 St. John's Settlement at 361-371 Pleasant Avenue. Staffed at the time by nine Sisters, it counted 42 girls and 35 boys as its wards.

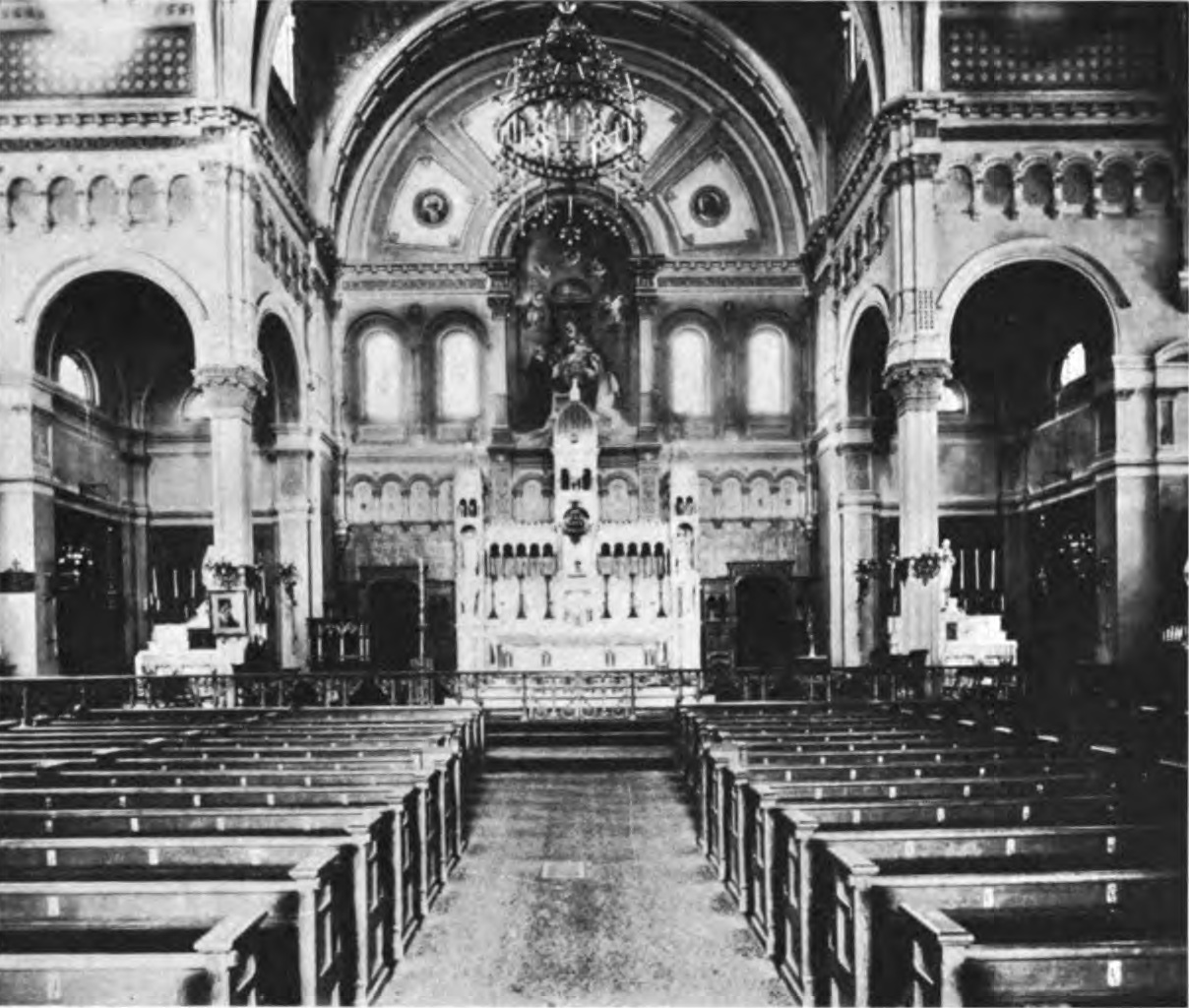
The interior of the church around 1914

From 1918 to 1925, two separate congregations existed in the same building. Kane and his two Irish assistants maintained the regular parish upstairs while Gaetano Arcese, assisted by several Italian priests, maintained the Italian one downstairs. The increasing Italian population in East Harlem had made it necessary to provide a priest at Holy Rosary who spoke their language. Arcese was chosen to minister to them in the lower church. Arcese, a native of Alpino, Italy, came to the United States at 17 years of age and studied for the priesthood at St. Joseph's Seminary, Dunwoodie. He was named monsignor in 1937 and as prothonotary apostolic and ecclesiastical superior to the Pallotine nuns in 1943. He arranged for the training of the nuns at Fordham University and for their teaching accreditation. He likewise moved St. John's Settlement, a children's home, to smaller quarters. In 1949, he opened the Holy Rosary School to an initial enrollment of 160 pupils with the help of two Sisters.

Upon the death of Arcese in 1953, Bonaventure Filitti from St. Patrick's Old Cathedral replaced him. Filitti added a wing to the parochial school and embellished the interior of the church and the rectory. Two years later he was transferred to Our Lady of Grace Parish in the Bronx.

Salvatore Cantatore, who had served as curate for six years under Arcese, was installed pastor in 1956. One of the significant developments taking shape during this period was the influx of Spanish-speaking immigrants around East Harlem. The first to serve their specific needs was Robert Banome who, prior to his priestly ordination, had worked in Puerto Rico. From 1968 to 1969 the pastor was Raphael Lombardi. In 1975, the School of Mt. Carmel under Terzo Vinci, a Pallotine and pastor of Our Lady of Mt. Carmel Parish, was merged with the Holy Rosary School under Pavis.

In 1975, masses were said in English, in Spanish and in Italian. There were evening devotions to Our Lady of Miraculous Medal, Our Lady of Perpetual Help and St. Anthony. Various organizations flourished, including Senior and Junior Legions of Mary, Holy Name, St. Anne and Sacred Heart societies, Senior and Junior Sodalities of Our Lady, St. Therese and St. Aloysius, Fathers and Mothers Clubs, St. Vincent de Paul, Boys and Girls CYOs, Boy and Girl Scouts, drum and bugle corps, choir, altar boys and ushers. There was a CYO Center next to the rectory. School enrollment rose to 727 and the number of faculty members to 16.

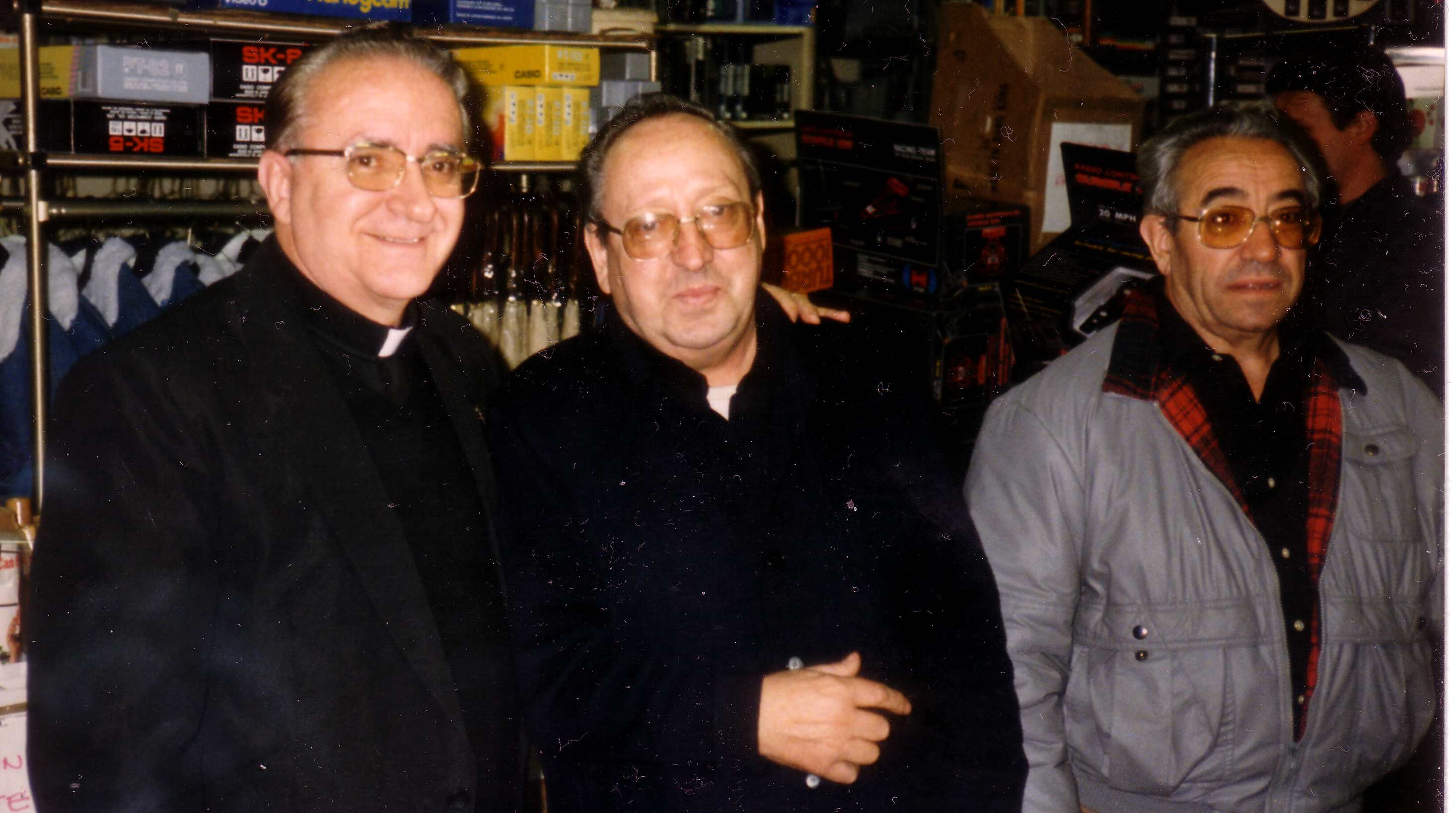
Three Augustinian priests who have served at Holy Rosary Parish: (From left) Nicanor L. Lana (1923–2006), Angel S. Dulanto and José H. Herrero

In 1976, Ronald Ciaravolo was appointed pastor. Renovation and painting of the church marked his term. Two years later, the Parish was entrusted by Terence Cooke, Archbishop of New York, to Nicanor L. Lana, former rector of the University of San Agustin in Iloilo City, Philippines, administered at the time by Augustinian friars affiliated to the Augustinian Province of the Most Holy Name of Jesus of the Philippines. When Lana was recalled by his religious superiors to head the Augustinian house in Neguri, Bilbao, Spain, Angel S. Dulanto succeeded him. Gilbert Luis R. Centina III was nominated pastor by Carlos F. Moran, Augustinian Father Provincial on Sept. 20, 2006. He was appointed pastor of Holy Rosary Church by Edward Egan, Archbishop of New York, on Dec. 1, 2006.

== Buildings ==
Byron purchased the site of the present church in March 1884, and soon learned of a recently vacated and unused church building that had formerly served the parishioners of St. Cecilia's. He arranged to have the building dismantled into its separate building materials, transported those materials by wagon to the banks of the East River, and then floated upstream to East 119th Street, where they again were hauled by wagon to the site purchased for Holy Rosary. All through the summer of 1884, parishioners and laborers reassembled old St. Cecilia's. On Rosary Sunday, October 5, 1884, Michael Corrigan, Coadjutor Archbishop, presided over the dedication of the church.

In the spring of 1898 a small chapel was built on 122nd St. and the church demolished. On Rosary Sunday, auxiliary bishop John Murphy Farley laid the cornerstone for the new church which was designed by architect Thomas Houghton in Byzantine-Romanesque style. The church was dedicated February 11, 1900. The church was renovated and repainted in 1976 during the pastorship of Ronald Ciaravolo.

=== Adaptive reuse ===
In June 2016, Catholic Charities established the Holy Rosary- Stabilization Bed program at Holy Rosary's former convent. The program provides comprehensive case management services to residents, formerly homeless adults with severe mental illness and substance abuse addiction.

== Pastors ==
- 1884–1892: Joseph A. Byron
- 1893–1909: Francis H. Wall
- 1909–1925: William J. Guinan
- 1916–1925: Thomas F. Kane
- 1918–1925: Gaetano Arcese (Italian congregation)
- 1925–1953: Gaetano Arcese
- 1953–1958: Bonaventure Filitti
- 1956–1968: Salvatore Cantatore
- 1968–1969: Raphael Lombardi
- 1969–1976: Victor Pavis
- 1976–1978: Ronald Ciaravolo
- 1978–1994: Nicanor L. Lana
- 1994–2006: Angel S. Dulanto
- 2006–2012: Gilbert Luis R. Centina III
