= Louis H. Giele =

American architect

- Born: May 1861; Hanover, Kingdom of Hanover
- Died: October 4, 1932 (aged 71); Jersey City, New Jersey
- Known for: church architecture

Louis Heinrick Giele, AIA (1861–1932) was a German-born American architect, who designed a number of Catholic churches, schools, convents and rectories in New York, New Jersey, Pennsylvania, Massachusetts, and elsewhere.

== Personal life ==
Giele was born "Ludwig Heinrich Giele" in Hanover and emigrated to the United States in January 1882 as a carpenter. He married Linda Holder in July 1884 in Jersey City and set up an architectural practice there.

== Architectural practice ==
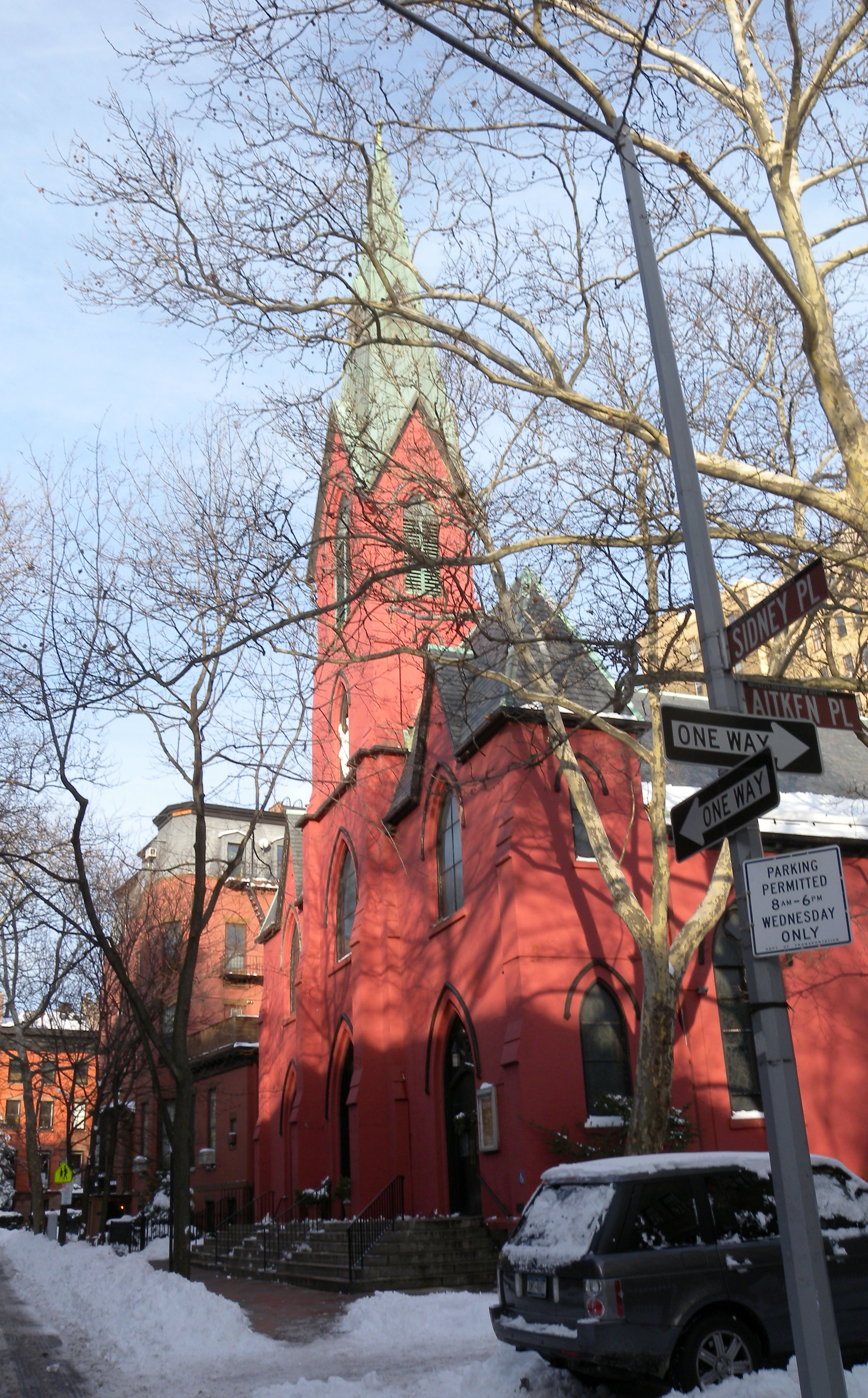
St Charles Borromeo, Brooklyn

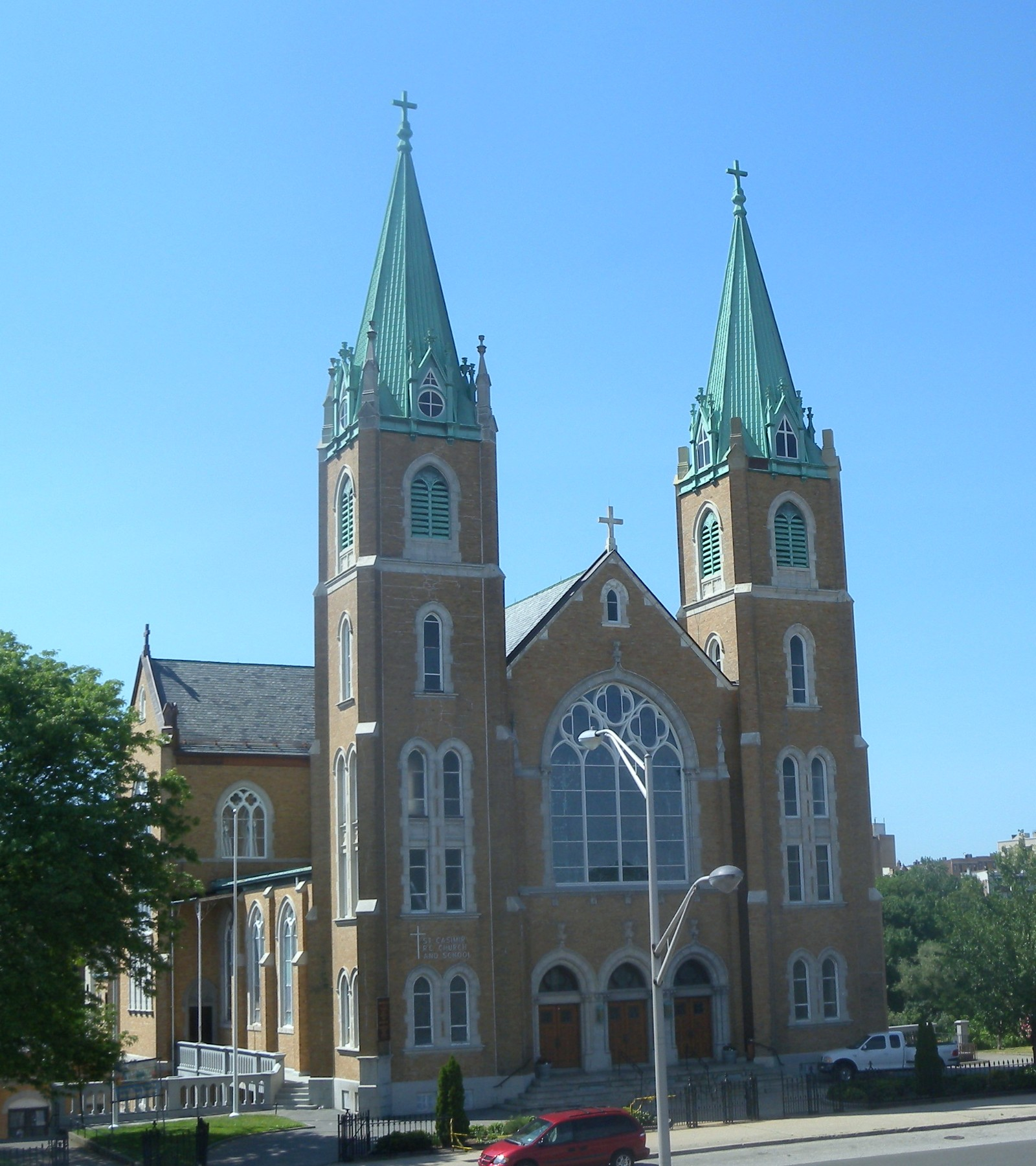
St Casimir, Yonkers

Although Giele was not a particularly prolific architect, his buildings were highly regarded, and at least two are listed on the National Register of Historic Places.

== Works include ==
- St Charles Borromeo Church, Brooklyn, New York
- St. Josephat School, Philadelphia, Pennsylvania
- St. John the Baptist Church, Allentown, Pennsylvania
- St. Casimir Church, Yonkers, New York
- Sacred Heart Hospital, Allentown, Pennsylvania
- St. Augustine Church, Bronx, New York
- St. Anne Church, Jersey City, NJ
- St. Anthony of Padua Church, Jersey City, New Jersey
- Sisters of Peace building, Jersey City, New Jersey
- Our Lady of Perpetual Help Church, New Bedford, Massachusetts
- St. John Cantius Church, Philadelphia, Pennsylvania
- St. Adalbert Church, Philadelphia, Pennsylvania
- St. Adalbert School, Philadelphia, Pennsylvania
- Assisium Institute, New York, New York
- Christ Temple of the Apostolic Faith, Harlem, New York
