= John Vredenburgh Van Pelt =

American architect (1874–1962)

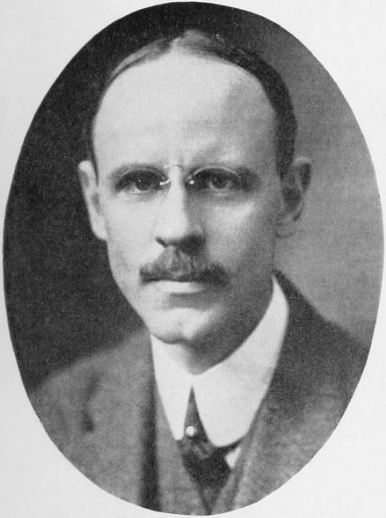
- Born: February 24, 1874; New Orleans, Louisiana, US
- Died: May 30, 1962 (aged 88); East Patchogue, New York, US
- Other names: John Van Pelt
- Occupation: Architect

John Vredenburgh Van Pelt, F.A.I.A., A.D.G.F., (February 24, 1874 – May 30, 1962) was an architectural historian, author, and American architect active in early to mid-twentieth-century New York City. He was a partner in Green & Van Pelt (1906), in Thompson & Van Pelt (1925), and Van Pelt, Hardy & Goubert (1928–1930). He had his offices in New York City and Patchogue, Long Island.

== Biography ==
Van Pelt was born in New Orleans and attended private schools there until attending the Ecole des Arts Decoratifs and the Ecole des Beaux Arts in Paris. In 1904, he worked for Carrère and Hastings.

His offices were on 45 West 45th Street, New York City (sharing office space with the architectural firm of Weiskopf & Pickworth), and Roe Boulevard, West, Patchogue, Long Island, New York.

During World War I, he was chairman of inspection committees and later in charge of computing the budget. He was a member and fellow of the American Institute of Architects and chairman of the Public Information Committee, a member of the Societe des Architectes Diplomes, Paris, member of the Beaux Arts Society of New York, and for several years secretary of the Finer Arts Federation, and Patchogue Chamber of Commerce.

Van Pelt died at Brookhaven Memorial Hospital in East Patchogue on May 30, 1962.

== Works ==
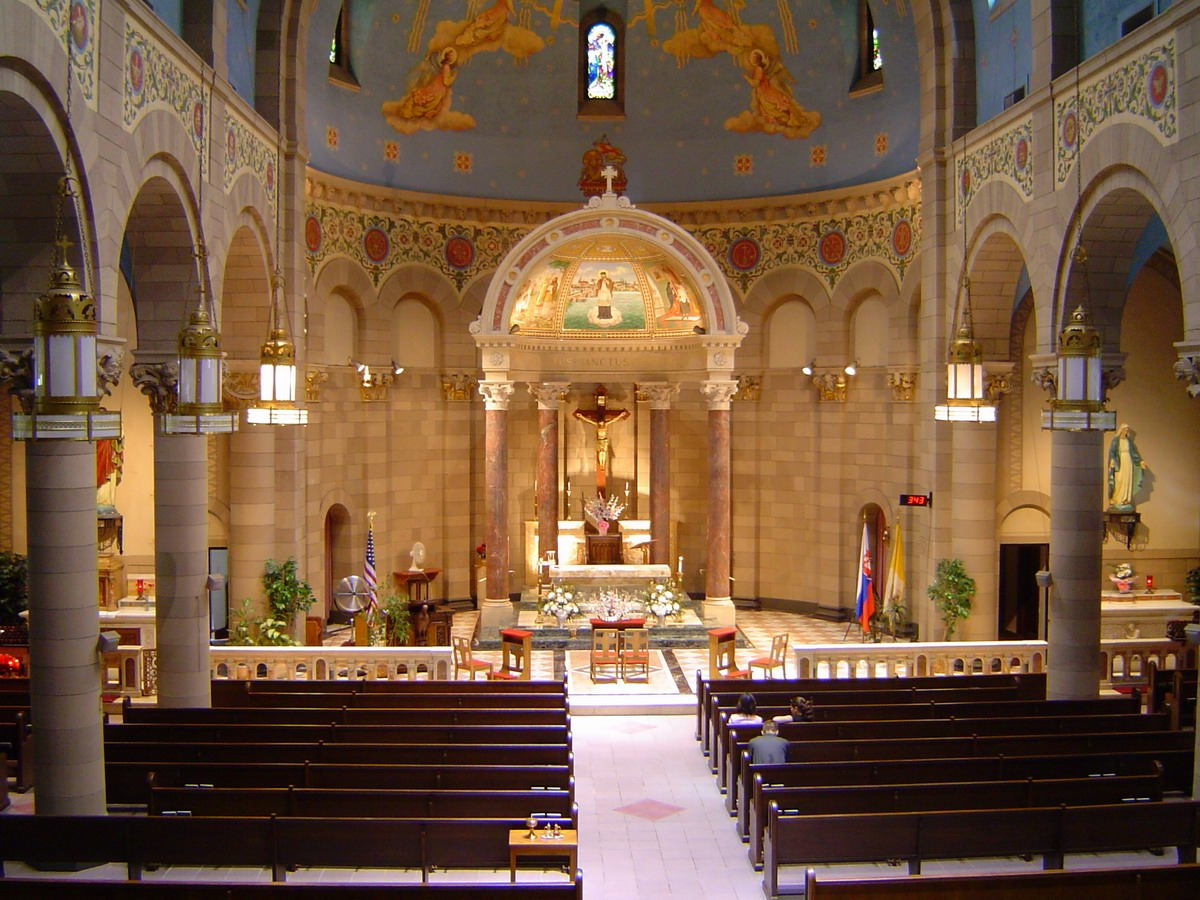
Church of St. John Nepomucene, New York

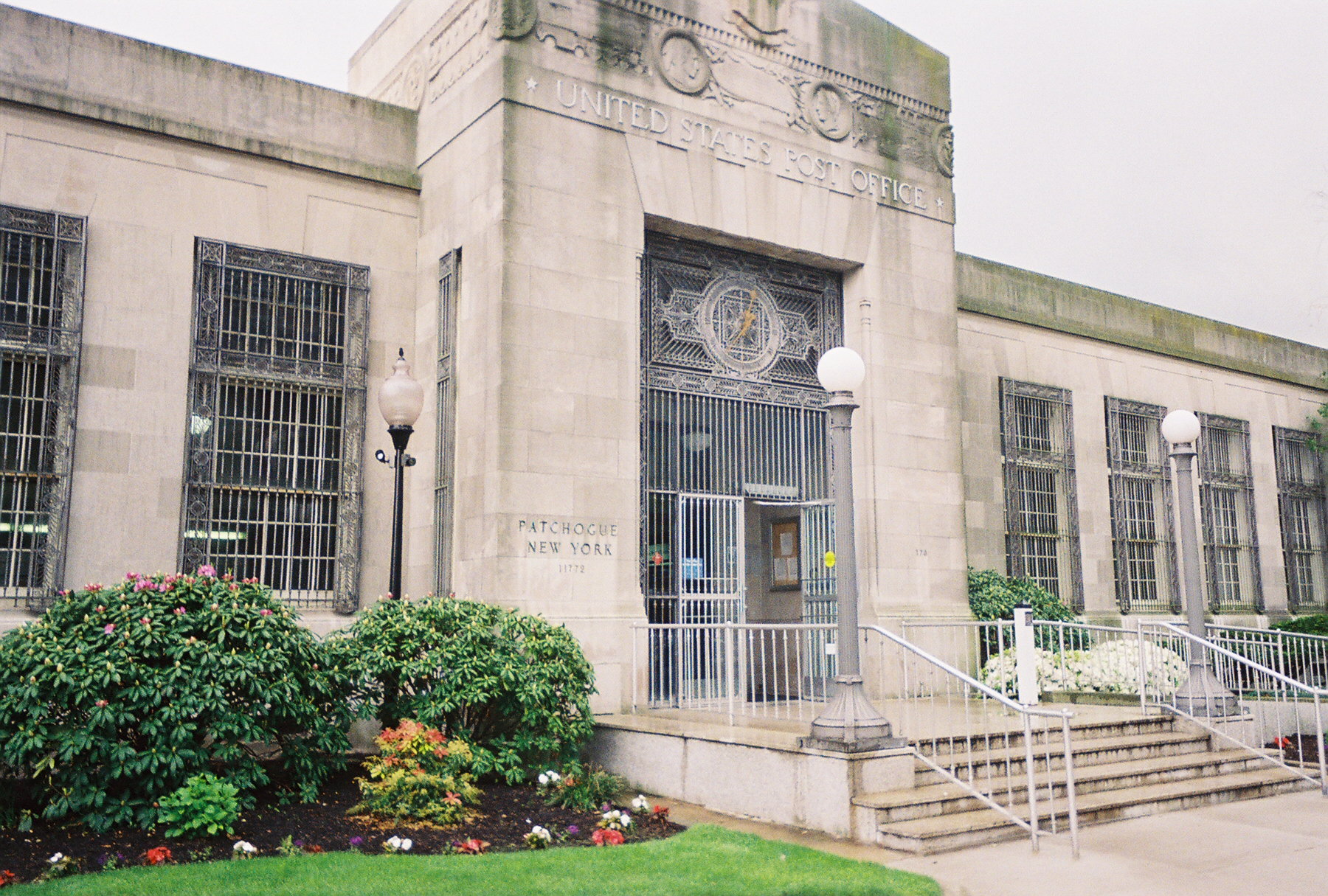
Lieutenant Michael P. Murphy Post Office, Patchogue, New York (1930)

- St. John the Evangelist Parish School SWC of First Avenue and 56th Street, a four-story brick and stone school, with fellow architect Franklin A. Green, NYC (1907)
- Patchogue Village Library Building, Patchogue, New York (1908)
- Our Lady of Victory Church (Bronx, New York) (1911)
- Nippon Club, at 161 West 93rd Street, NYC (1912)
- plinth, Joan of Arc Monument on Riverside Drive, 93rd Street, Upper West Side, New York City (Anna Hyatt Huntington, sculptor) (1915)
- Church, School and Rectory of Church of St. John Nepomucene, NYC, built for $300,000 (1925)
- The Gennadius Library and Residences for the American School of Classical Studies at Athens, built for $375,000 in Greece (but if in America would have cost $1,150,000 with marble carving being done by refugees from Smyrna) (1926)
- United States Post Office (Patchogue, New York) (1930)
- Church of the Guardian Angel (New York City) (1930), 10th Avenue at 21st Street.
- Residence of Newton Fassett, in Elmira, New York, built for $45,000
- Residence of George E. Hardy, Fishers Island, built for $150,000.
- school, Our Lady of Mercy, Webster Avenue, Bronx, New York, built for $200,000
- Our Lady of the Rosary Church (Yonkers, New York)
- St. Ambrose Church (Manhattan)

== Published writings ==
- A Discussion of Composition, Especially as Applied to Architecture, 1902.
  - Later edition: The Essentials of Composition as Applied to Art. New York: The Macmillan Company, 1913.
- Architecture Toscane-the Library of Architectural Documents, Volume 1-Palais, Maisons Et Autres Edifices De La Toscane, Volume 2-D'Espouy-Fragments D'Architecture Antique (preface and introduction). New York: Pencil Points Press, 1923.
- Selected monuments of French gothic architecture: one hundred plates from the Archives de la Commission de monuments historiques. The Pencil Points Press, inc. 1924.
- Masterpieces of Spanish Architecture. New York: Pencil Points Press, 1925.
