= United States Post Office (Patchogue, New York) =

- US Post Office — Patchogue
- U.S. National Register of Historic Places
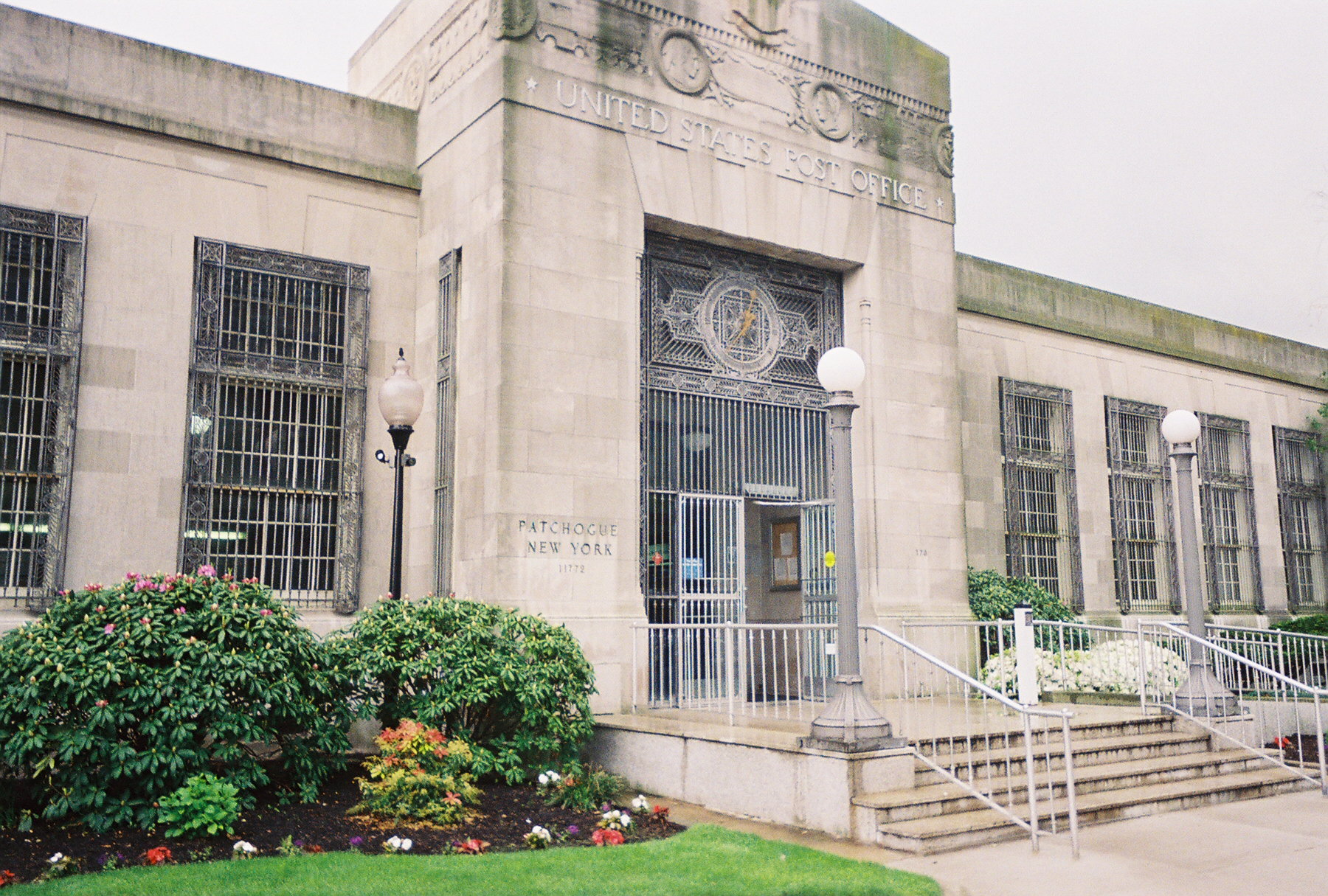
- The front of the Patchogue Post Office

- Location within Long Island Location within the United States
- Interactive map showing the location for U.S. Post Office-Patchogue
- Location: 170 East Main Street; Patchogue, New York
- Coordinates: 40°45′55″N 73°0′42″W
- Area: less than one acre
- Built: 1932
- Architect: John V. Van Pelt of Van Pelt, Hardy & Goubert
- Architectural style: Art Deco, Classical Revival
- MPS: US Post Offices in New York State, 1858-1943, TR
- NRHP reference No.: 88002397
- Added to NRHP: May 11, 1989

The U.S. Post Office in Patchogue, New York is located at 170 East Main Street in the Suffolk County village. It serves the ZIP Code 11772, covering the entire Village of Patchogue, as well as the hamlets of North Patchogue and East Patchogue.

== History ==
Patchogue Post Office was built 1930 to the designs by architect John Vredenburgh Van Pelt of Van Pelt, Hardy & Goubert, and combines Art Deco & Classical Revival architecture. The front building facade is boldly scaled in limestone, and is highlighted with relief sculpture and large monumental windows with decorative aluminum grillage. A matching analog clock sites over the front entrance doors. The rest of the building is made primarily of brick. Long Island-based stamp collectors have often considered the Patchogue Post Office to be one of several sources for stamps with obscure denominations.

The building was added to the National Register of Historic Places on May 11, 1989. Three other post office buildings in Suffolk County were listed on the NRHP on the same day, but neither of them were designed by the same architect, nor were they designed in the same style as the one in Patchogue. In 2005, the United States Congress enacted legislation renaming the building the Lieutenant Michael P. Murphy Post Office Building, commemorating the heroism of Medal of Honor recipient Michael P. Murphy.

== See also ==
- United States Post Office (Port Washington, New York)
