= St. Ambrose Church (New York City) =

Church in Manhattan, United States

Coordinates: 40°46′5.04″N 73°59′29.9″W

The Church of St. Ambrose

General information
- Location: Manhattan, New York, United States of America
- Client: Roman Catholic Archdiocese of New York

Design and construction
- Architect: John V. Van Pelt

The Church of St. Ambrose is a former Roman Catholic parish church under the authority of the Roman Catholic Archdiocese of New York, located at 539 West 54th Street in Manhattan, New York City. The parish was established in 1897. The church was designed by John Vredenburgh Van Pelt in the Gothic Revival style.

In 1938, the congregation disbanded. The building became the Sisters of Mary Immaculate's Centro Maria, a woman's residence. Founded in 1920, Centro Maria provides care and a temporary, transitional home for women from different countries that come to work or to study in New York. It also provides information, referrals, and assistance in job placement for the young women who stay there and celebrate Mass in its chapel.
