= Our Lady of Mercy's Church (Bronx) =

Church building in New York, US

Coordinates: 40°51′39.6″N 73°53′36″W

The Church of Our Lady of Mercy

General information
- Architectural style: Gothic Revival
- Location: Fordham, Bronx, New York City, New York, United States
- Completed: 1910 (for church)
- Cost: $200,000 (for parochial school)
- Client: Roman Catholic Archdiocese of New York

Design and construction
- Architect: John V. Van Pelt (for parochial school)

The Church of Our Lady of Mercy is a Roman Catholic parish church under the authority of the Roman Catholic Archdiocese of New York, located at 2496 Marion Avenue, Fordham, Bronx, New York City, New York.

== Parish history ==
The parish was established in 1907. "The old Church of Our Lady of Mercy on the grounds of Fordham University, having reverted to the use for which it was originally intended, it became necessary to provide a church for the Catholics of that vicinity, who had for years attended the old church within the college gates. Rev. C. Rigney, formerly pastor of St. Joseph's Church, Rossville, Staten Island, was appointed to organize the parish, and began his work in 1892. He secured the old club-house of the Tammany Society and altered it into a church structure. His first assistant was the Rev. Edmund W. Cronin, and he was afterward assisted by the Rev. Michael F. Horan and James A. Collins. The rector, the Rev. Patrick N. Breslin, is assisted by the Rev. Justin J. Lyons and Martin P. O'Gara." The address listed for this mission was not given in 1892 but it was listed as being in Fordham. In 1914, the congregation numbered around 1,000, and the church property was valued at $65,000, with a dept of $11,000.

== Buildings ==
The present Gothic Revival-style church building opened in 1910.

== Pastors ==
- The Rev. C. Rigney
- The Rev. Edmund W. Cronin, assisted by the Rev. Michael F. Horan and the Rev. James A. Collins
- The Rev. Patrick N. Breslin, assisted by the Rev. Justin J. Lyons and the Rev. Martin P. O'Gara

== Our Lady of Mercy Elementary School ==
In 1914, the parochial school, Our Lady of Mercy School, was conducted by 7 Ursuline Nuns and 2 lay teachers, and had 132 boys and 193 girls. The school, located on Webster Avenue, was built for $200,000 to the designs of architect John V. Van Pelt The official address given for the elementary school is 2512 Marion Avenue, Bronx, New York City. The school has around 300 students from Prekindergarten to 8th Grade. In June, 2013, the Our Lady of Mercy parish school at 2512 Marion Avenue closed.
