= Our Lady of Victory Cathedral =

Our Lady of Victory Cathedral or Our Lady of Victories Cathedral may refer to:

Brazil

- Our Lady of Victory Cathedral, Vitória

Cameroon

- Our Lady of Victories Cathedral, Yaoundé

Japan

- Our Lady of Victory Cathedral, Fukuoka

Lesotho

- Our Lady of Victories Cathedral, Maseru

Senegal

- Our Lady of Victories Cathedral, Dakar

United States

- Our Lady of Victory Cathedral (Victoria, Texas)

== See also ==
- Our Lady of Victory (disambiguation)
