= St. Paul Church (New York City) =

Catholic church in Manhattan, New York

Coordinates: 40°47′59.46″N 73°56′30.08″W

St. Paul's Church
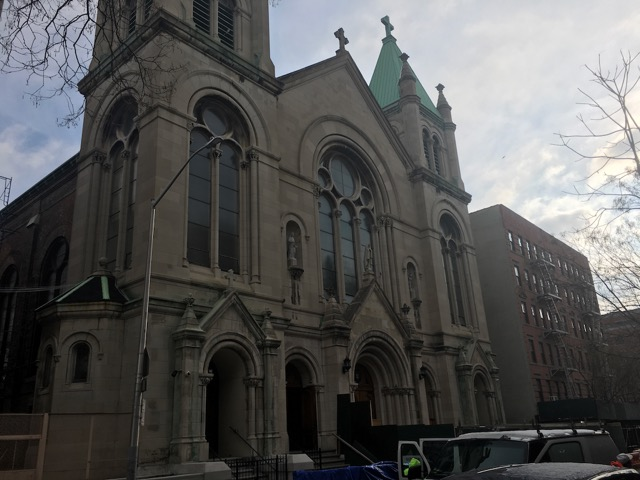
- (2018)

Religion
- Affiliation: Roman Catholic
- Province: Archdiocese of New York
- Leadership: Fr Pablo Waldman

Location
- Location: 113 East 117th Street; Manhattan, New York City
- Country: United States
- Interactive map of St. Paul's Church

Architecture
- Completed: 1834

Website
- stpaulchurchhive.org

The Church of St. Paul is a Catholic parish in the Archdiocese of New York, located in the East Harlem neighborhood of Manhattan, New York City. The sixth parish established in New York City, it was designated a New York City Landmark on June 28, 2016.

== History ==
Before 1834 the only Catholic north of Canal Street was St. Patrick's Old Cathedral. Rev. James Walsh and others said Mass in houses and barns in the outlying areas when a congregation could be gathered. Bishop John Dubois decided to establish a parish on 117th Street and asked Rev. Michael Curran to take charge. Curran had been a missionary in the mountains of Pennsylvania and had come highly recommended by Father Demetrius Augustine Gallitzin. His knowledge of Gaelic served him well among his widely scattered parishioners. The cornerstone of St. Paul's church was set June 29, 1835. In 1843, Curran resigned the pastorate in order to return to Ireland for a time.

During Fr. Maguire's tenure the church was substantially enlarged and rededicated by Archbishop John McCloskey on July 9, 1871. Dr. McQuirk had the old school demolished in 1905 and a new one built on the site. While a new church was being built, services were held in the school auditorium. A new rectory was also built. The demographics of the area, which had been predominantly Irish, gradually changed to reflect more Spanish speaking Catholics. Msgr. Drew initiated a Spanish program.

It has been staffed by the Institute of the Incarnate Word Fathers since 1998. In 1892, the parish address was 121 E 117th St. In 2015 the parish of Holy Rosary was merged with St. Paul's.

=== Pastors ===
- Fr. Michael Curran, 1834-1843
- Fr. John Walsh, 1843-1853
- Fr. George R. Brophy, 1853-1866
- Fr. Eugene Maguire, 1866-1883
- Fr. John McQuirk D.D., 1883-1924
- Fr. Thomas F. Kane, 1924-1940
- Msgr. Cornelius J. Drew, 1940-1943
- Msgr. John c. Mulcahy, 1943-1946
- Rev. James V. Hart, 1946-
- Fr. Ray Burn 1964-

=== Building ===
The church is of brick over a steel frame, with a limestone façade. Completed in 1908, it was designed in the Romanesque Revival style by the firm of Neville & Bagge. During Fr. Kane's tenure a marble altar rail and a solid oak reredos were installed.

== St. Paul's School ==
In 1870 Father Eugene Maguire established the parish school, which was under the care of the Sisters of Charity of New York. Since 1850 the Sisters, from the mother house at McGowan's Pass, had taught catechism at St. Paul's. The Carmel Hill Program, established by philanthropist Aiden Ruane provides tuition assistance to over 30 students.

== See also ==
- List of New York City Designated Landmarks in Manhattan
- National Register of Historic Places listings in New York County, New York
