= St. Augustine's Church (Bronx) =

Former church in New York

Coordinates: 40°49′45″N 73°54′18″W

The Church of St. Augustine
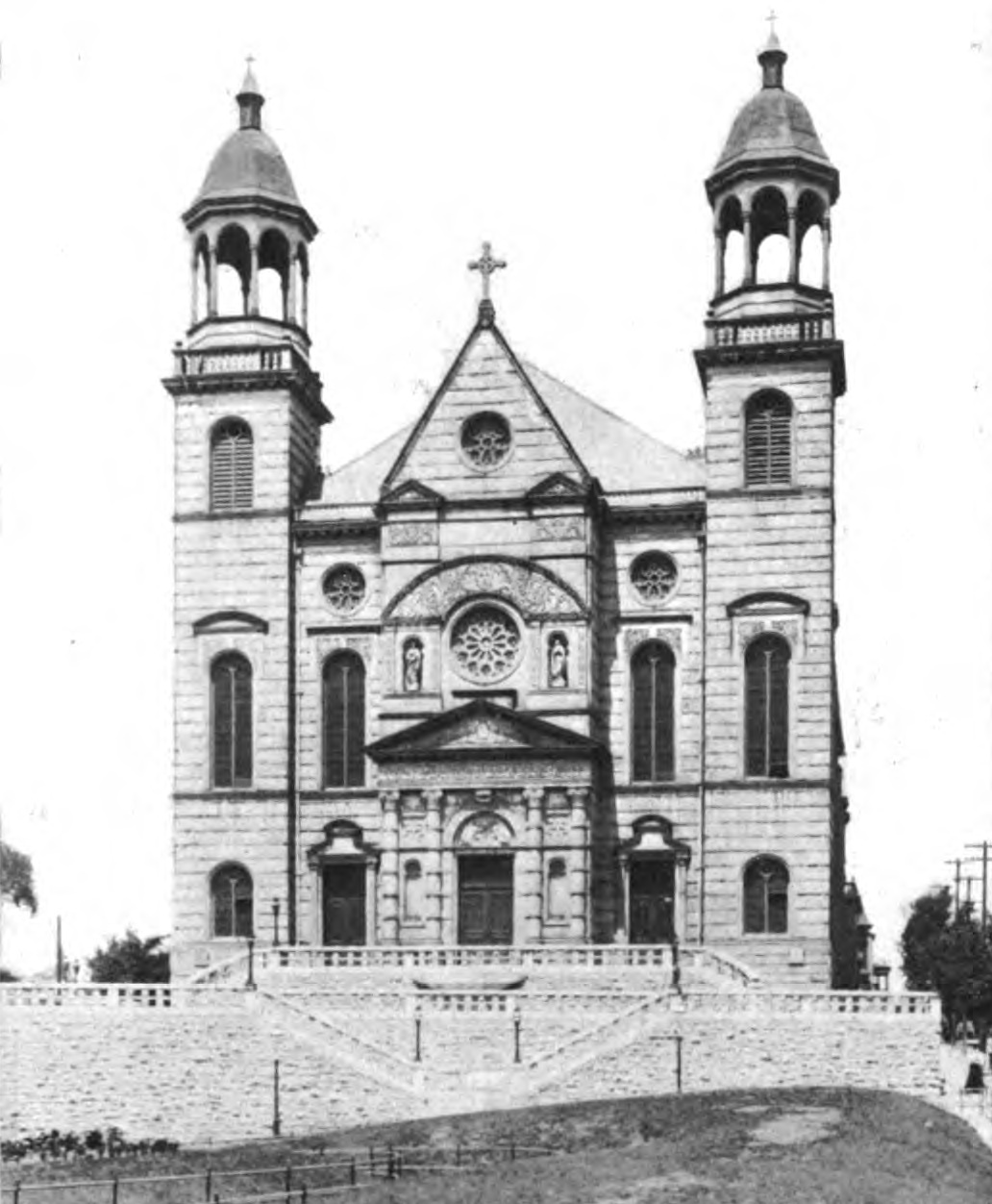
- The church as it appeared in 1914
- Interactive map of the The Church of St. Augustine area

General information
- Architectural style: Baroque Revival; Renaissance Revival
- Location: Morrisania, the Bronx, New York City, United States
- Construction started: 1906 (school)
- Completed: 1850 (timber church); 1858 (brick church); 1894 (third and present church); 1904 (school)
- Cost: $50,000 (for 1906 school)
- Client: Roman Catholic Archdiocese of New York

Technical details
- Structural system: Brick masonry with terra-cotta trim (churches and school)

Design and construction
- Architects: Louis H. Giele (1894 church); J. O'Connor (1906 school)

The Church of St. Augustine was a Roman Catholic parish church under the authority of the Roman Catholic Archdiocese of New York. It was located at 1183 Franklin Avenue between East 167th Street and East 168th Street in the Morrisania neighborhood of the Bronx, New York City. St. Augustine's merged with Our Lady of Victory to form the parish of St. Augustine - Our Lady of Victory. St. Augustine's was closed in 2011 and demolished in 2013.

== Buildings ==
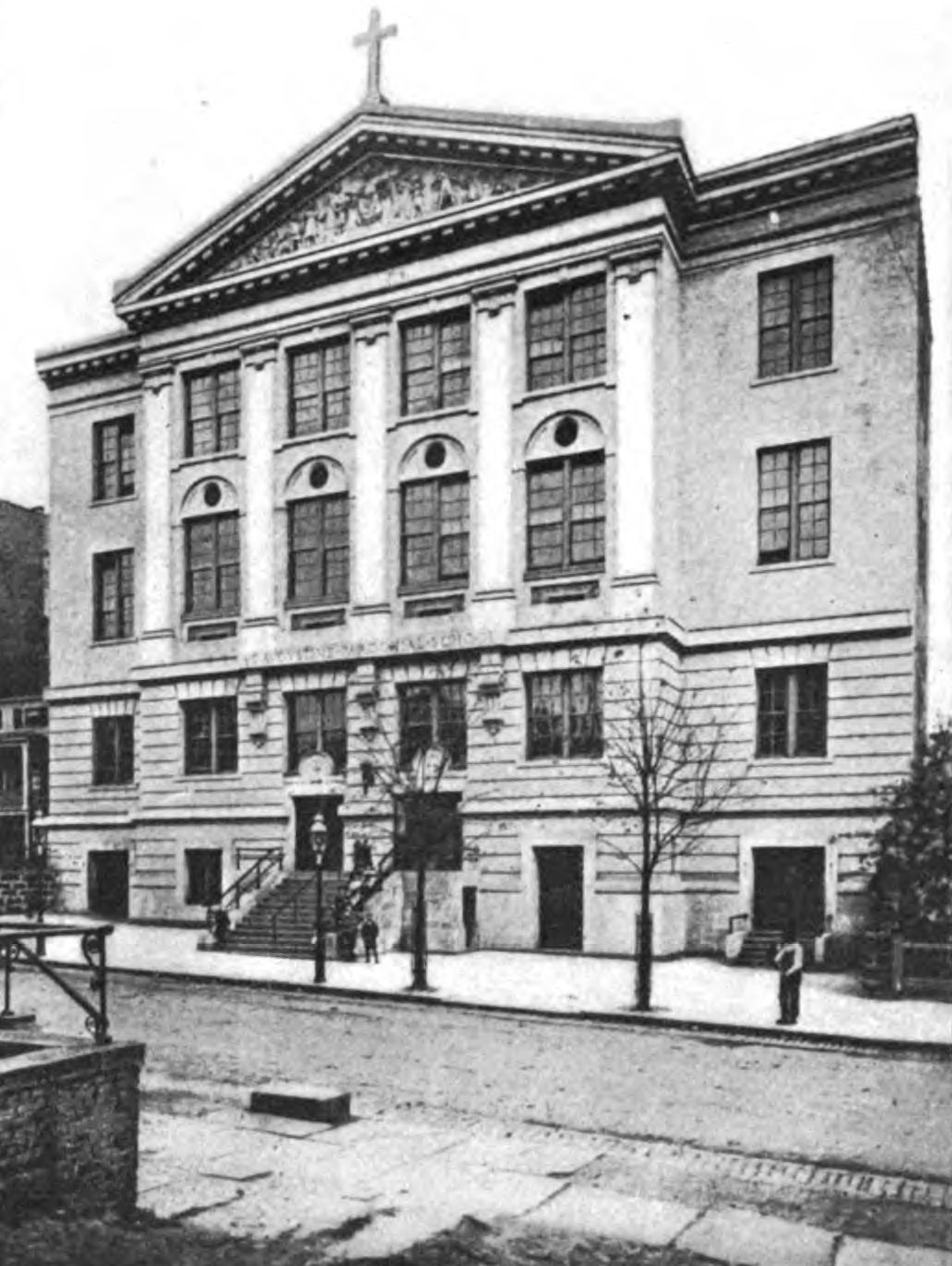
The school as it appeared in 1914

The church was built in 1894 to the designs of architect Louis H. Giele with Baroque Revival and Renaissance Revival design elements. It was dedicated in 1895 by the Archbishop of New York. The parochial school nearby was completed in 1904. The AIA Guide to New York City (2010) described the church's architecture as: "Renaissance and Baroque elements combine in this somber but imposing facade. The parish school across the street to the north is distinguished by glazed blue and white terra-cotta sculpture set into the tympanum of its Classical pediment." Plans were filed by owner the Augustine Society of Tompkinsville, Staten Island, in April 1906 for a site on the southeast of Andrew Avenue, 200 feet south of Fordham Road. The structure would be a two-storey brick school, 54x100 feet, to the designs by architect J. O'Connor for $50,000.

The church developed leaks and was deemed unsafe in the summer of 2009, with worship services continuing in the auditorium of St. Augustine's Parochial School. Funds from the school had been helping pay the church building's upkeep. The Rev. Thomas Fenlon, pastor of the church, sought a developer to demolish St. Augustine's Church and build affordable housing on the site, constructing a new smaller church next door. In late 2013, the church, rectory and convent were demolished.

== Parish history ==
The parish was canonically established in 1849 as the Bronx began attracting German and Irish residents. The first mass was held in a private residence on Boston Road. The Morrisania site for the present church on the northeast corner of Franklin Avenue and Jefferson Street was purchased in 1850 with a small wooden church immediately being erected. This in turn was replaced in 1858 by one of brick construction and dedicated by Archbishop John Hughes. In 1892, the parish address was at 867 Jefferson Street. That structure was destroyed in 1894 during a fire and the present structure was dedicated in 1895.

As the Bronx grew in the early 20th century, Irish, German, and Italian immigrants swelled the congregation. To serve this enlarged parish, a parochial school (see below) was established in 1906.

Ongoing construction with the parish school and significant debt accumulated towards the management of the church necessitated the parish to establish the Diamond Jubilee Campaign, which proved inadequate "to cope with the poor structural condition of the church" during the 1930s and 1940s. The post-World War II white flight from Morrisania and the South Bronx in general and the community's replacement with many African Americans from Harlem led to the congregation dwindling and becoming overwhelmingly African American by the late 1950s. By the late 1960s, the parish was reduced by a third again as drug-related issues affected the neighborhood.

== Outreach ==
St. Augustine's held weekly masses in three languages. It sponsored many community programs, including a food pantry, a men's society, Alcoholics Anonymous, and youth dances. By the early 1970s, parish leaders, including the Rev. Robert Jeffers, began to strategize on how to improve the community. During that decade, a group of Franciscans began administering specifically "to children, elderly, and anyone else in need." St. Augustine's School of the Arts was established in 1979 to provide neighborhood youth an arts-based curriculum. The church also established the Alpha Housing Coalition to provide assistance to neighborhood tenants and residents. Since the mid-1980s, the church was a member of the SHARE (Self-Help and Resource Exchange) Program, providing families with food packages in exchange for community service. The church was a founding member in the 1987 establishment of South Bronx Churches (SBC), an organization providing area residents with housing and other services. As of December 2010, Sister Dorothy Hall ran the food pantry.

== St. Augustine's School ==
St. Augustine's School is located at 1176 Franklin Avenue on the east side between East 167th Street and East 168th Street. According to the AIA Guide to New York City, the structure was completed in 1904. However, a New York Times article indicates the building permit was only filed in 1906, which would agree with the school's own history of its founding. (Alternatively, different buildings might be in question.) The parish history dates the parochial school's establishment to 1906. The original building was designed for 1,200 students but a new schoolhouse was constructed on Fulton Avenue in 1913 to accommodate greater numbers.

It was reported in December 2010, that St. Augustine School was "one of six Bronx parochial schools facing closure by the New York Archdiocese because of dwindling enrollment and mounting deficits." The school was also serving as the place of worship since the church building was deemed unsafe. "St. Augustine enrolled only 170 students this fall, down from 252 in 2008, with [school board member Michael] Brady blaming the bad economy and a tuition hike ordered by the Archdiocese. The school's families earn just an average of $16,000 per year, he said, but 100% of its students graduate on time and 98% go to college....The school is 10% Muslim." Efforts to keep the school open included teachers agreeing to cut their salaries by 10% and the school launching a registration drive, which enrolled "45 new students in less than two weeks." Tuition was 3% of their annual family income. Archbishop Timothy Dolan visited the church in August 2010, and the school was among 27 whose closure he announced on 11 January 2011.
