= Church of the Guardian Angel (Manhattan) =

Church in Manhattan, New York

Coordinates: 40°44′48.03″N 74°0′19.34″W

The Church of the Guardian Angel
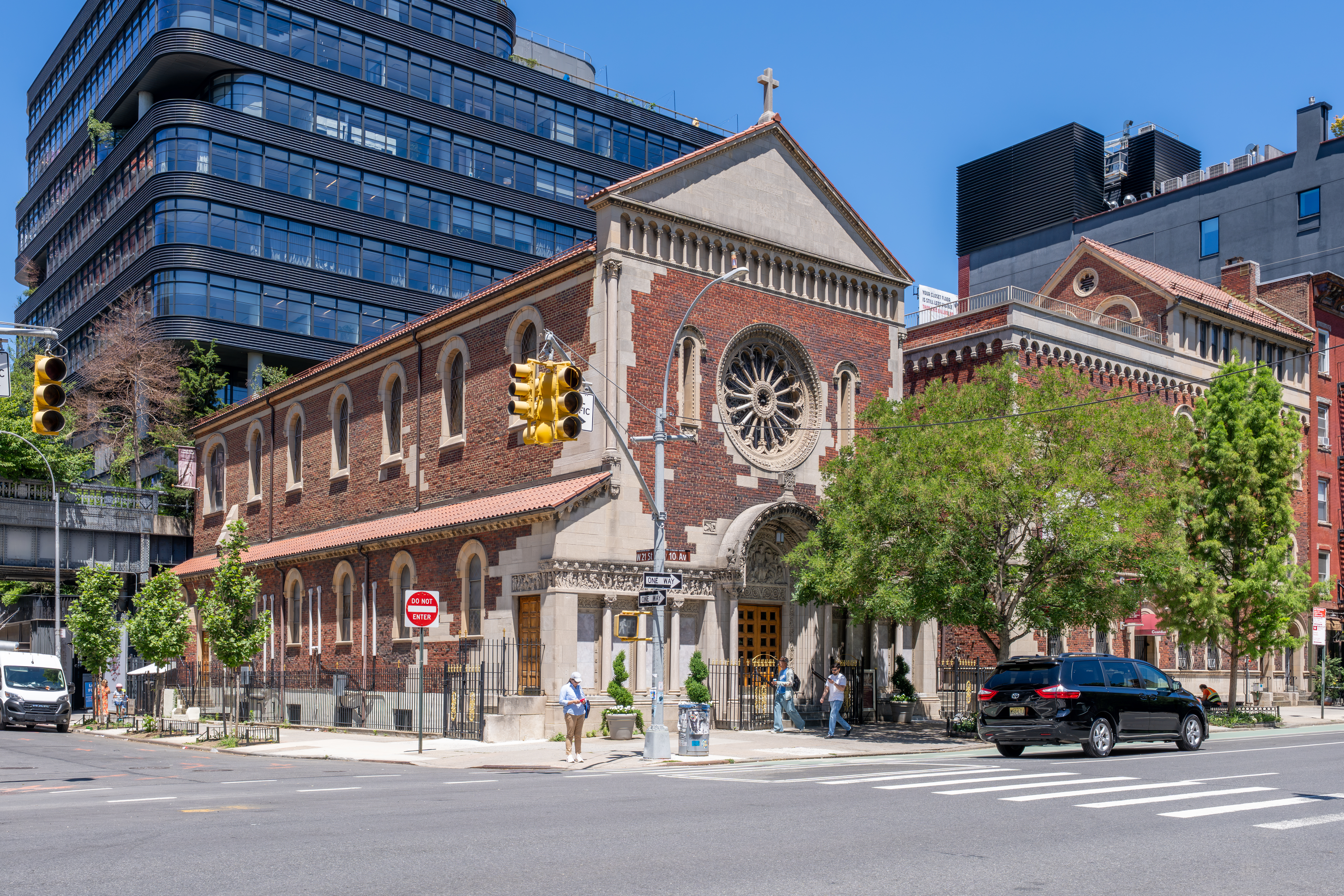
- Interactive map of the The Church of the Guardian Angel area

General information
- Architectural style: Southern Sicilian Romanesque (for 1930 church)
- Location: Chelsea, Manhattan, New York City, New York, United States
- Construction started: 1888 (for first church); 1929
- Completed: 1888 (for first church); 1910 (for second church); 1930 (for present church)
- Demolished: 1910 (for 1888 church); 1930 (for 1910 church)
- Client: Roman Catholic Archdiocese of New York

Technical details
- Structural system: Brick masonry (for 1930 church)

Design and construction
- Architects: George H. Streeton (for 1910 church); John V. Van Pelt of Van Pelt, Hardy & Goubert (for present 1930 church)

Website
- https://guardianangelstcolumba.org/guardian-angel

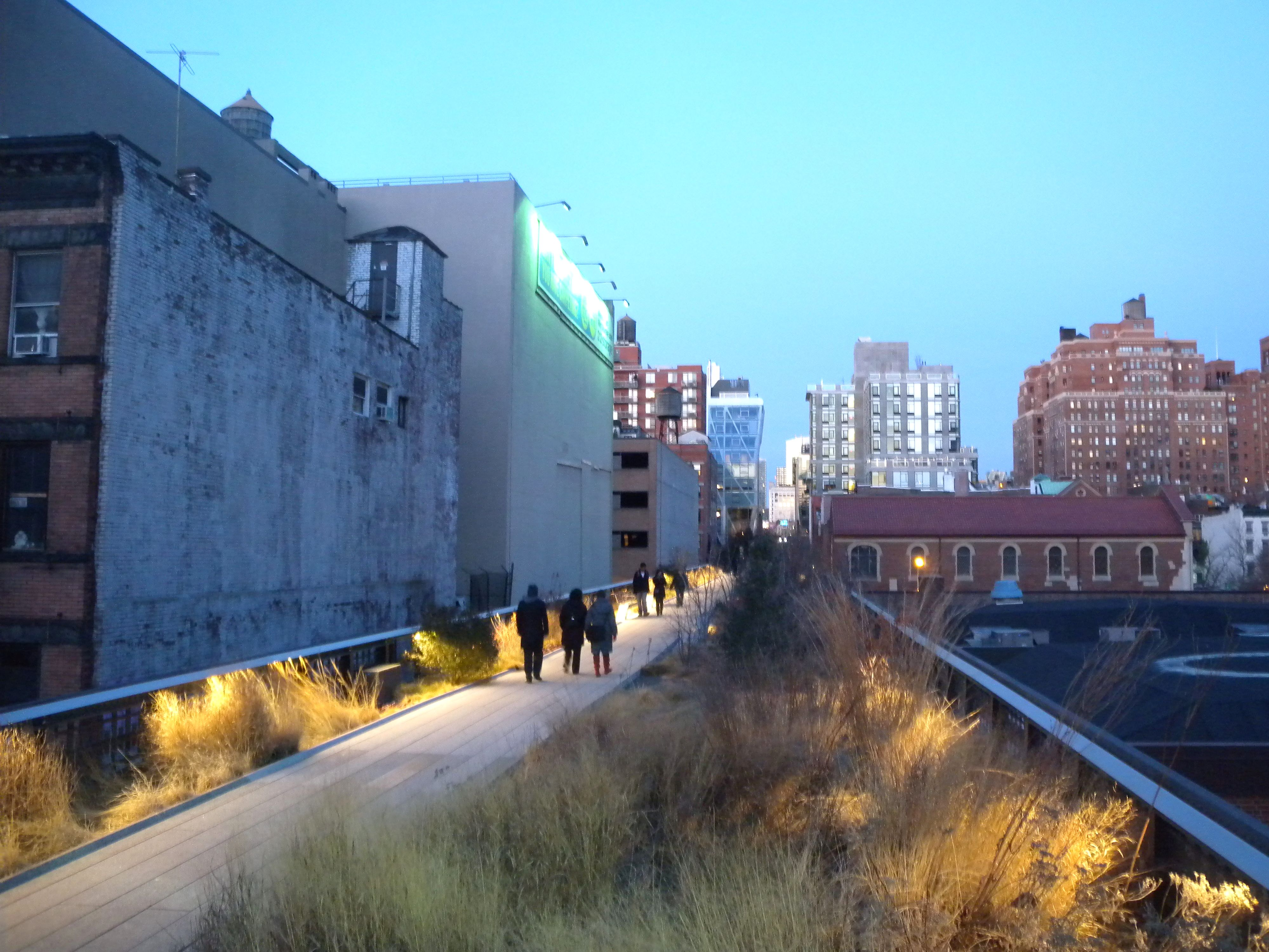
Church on right as seen from the High Line

The Church of the Guardian Angel is a Roman Catholic church in the Roman Catholic Archdiocese of New York, located at 193 Tenth Avenue, Chelsea, Manhattan, New York City, New York.

== Buildings ==
The present Southern Sicilian Romanesque-style brick church at 193 Tenth Avenue was built 1930 to the designs of John Van Pelt of Van Pelt, Hardy & Goubert. Plan were filed in 1929, and it was likely begun that year. Stylistically, it is similar to Van Pelt's other churches in Manhattan and the Bronx. The church design "is reminiscent of the early Romanesque sculpture at the abbey of Moissac. Both churches have a scalloped profile that seems to incorporate a bit of Moorish influence. Both the human and animal forms are treated with the same incredible flexibility...." The AIA Guide to New York City (1988) writes "The church's simple brick and limestone Southern Sicilian Romanesque facade merges with the Tuscan village forms of auxiliary buildings to the north in a well- related group." AIA Guide to New York City (2010) describes the church as "lush brick and limestone, Italian Romanesque, backed up snug against the High Line. Despite the obvious difference in style and materials, the two were built around the same time."

== Parish history ==
The parish was founded in 1888 by the Rev. William A. O'Neill, who remained pastor until 1895 when he was transferred to St. Ann's as rector. The first church was dedicated June 10, 1888 by Bishop Conroy. The address for the first church was located at 513 West 23rd Street, as recorded in 1892.

The parish was founded to minister to workers at the bustling waterfront piers on the nearby Hudson River. A new church was completed in 1910 to the designs of George H. Streeton also at 513<My great grandmother married her second husband there in 1906. The address on the Certificate Of Marriage is 511 W. 23rd St. NOT 513 W. 23rd St.> West 23rd Street, replacing the 1888 church building. "In 1911, a parochial school was opened." In 1914, the following was reported: "The Catholic population numbers 3,000, and the church property is valued at $60,000, all out of debt."

That area's redevelopment in the 1930s with the construction of the elevated freight railroad, the High Line, by the New York Central Railroad necessitated the church's removal. Similar to the story of nearby St. Michael, the church's demolition and removal for redevelopment in the interests of a railroad were allegedly paid for by that developing railroad, which in this case was the New York Central. The architecture of the new church (see Buildings section) both seemingly ignores and stands in stark contrast, almost antagonistically to that of the High Line, perhaps reflecting this early relationship.

Although threatened with closure, the Archdiocese announced on January 19, 2007 that Guardian Angel would retain its parish status.

== Pastors ==
- 1888–1895: Rev. William A. O'Neill, transferred 1895 as rector of St. Ann's
- 1895–1909: Rev. John C. Henry, former pastor of St. Mary's Church. He had been assisted until 1904 by the Rev. Anthony J. Morgan (transferred to the Mission of Our Lady of the Rosary), replaced by the Rev. Francis A. Kiniry.
- 1909–1930: Rev. James F. Raywood (Dec 7, 1854 – Apr 6, 1930), a former assistant at St. Columba, a pastor of St. Mary’s Church (Newburg, New York), and founding pastor at a Monticello, New York, parish. In 1914, Fr. Raywood was assisted by the Revs. Timothy J. O'Brien and Daniel J. Fant.
- 1930–1934: Rev. Grogan (d.1934)
- 1934–1967: Rev. John J. O'Donnell, former assistant at Holy Trinity Church
- Rev. Francis X. Quinn, assistant pastor in 1939 and 1940 who was awarded a Congressional Gold Medal for bravery
- 1971–1983: Msgr. Thomas J. McGovern, pastor of Guardian Angel Church and chaplain for the Port of New York. Ordained 1950. Ref: New York Times Obituaries 6-20-1986.
- 2009–2014: Msgr. Michael F. Hull, S.T.D. (also a Professor of Sacred Scripture at St. Joseph’s Seminary (Dunwoodie) in Yonkers, New York, and a Censor Librorum of the Archdiocese of New York, assisted by the Rev. Philip S. Phan (also Director of the Archdiocese's Vietnamese Apostolate).

== Parish School ==
The school was founded in 1911 and has always been run by a professional lay staff and the Dominican Sisters of Newburgh. "In 1911, a parochial school was opened; its school roll in 1914 shows an attendance of 132 boys and 130 girls." Five Sisters of St. Dominic ran the school, as reported in 1914. Along with the church's relocation in 1930, the school relocated to its current location at 193 Tenth Avenue, New York, NY 10011. The style of the schoolhouse is the same as the church, indicating that the complex was built by Van Pelt concurrently with the church building in 1930, or thereabouts. The former principal is Miss Maureen McElduff.

In 2016, Guardian Angel School was featured in the HBO Documentary Class Divide. This documentary showcases what it means to grow up in Chelsea and the power of education.

In 2018, the Manhattan Region released a video called "We are One" featuring different Guardian Angel staff and families.

On February 15, 2023 the Archdiocese of New York announced that Guardian Angel School would close at the end of the school year.
