= Our Lady of Victories Church, Glasnevin =

Our Lady of Victories Church
- Church of Our Lady of Victories
- The Church of Our Lady of Victories

- Location in Dublin
- 53.387766°N 6.263963°W
- Address: Ballymun Road, Dublin 9 D09 Y925
- Country: Ireland
- Denomination: Catholic
- Website: olv.ie

History
- Founder: Fr. Bernard Brady

Administration
- Archdiocese: Roman Catholic Archdiocese of Dublin
- Parish: Ballymun Road

Side view of the Our Lady of Victories Church on a cloudy day

The Church of Our Lady of Victories, or the Our Lady of Victories Church, is a Catholic church on the Ballymun Road in Glasnevin, on the Northside of Dublin, Ireland. It is the only church in the Ballymun Road parish, and is the parish pastoral centre of Ballymun Road.

== Background ==
In the 1960s, after the collapse of several tenements in Dublin, the Irish Government decided to rehouse those living in Dublin's tenement areas in Ballymun on Dublin's Northern outskirts. Dublin Corporation purchased lands from the Albert Agricultural College, and the Department of Local Government decided that a building consortium would constructed prefabricated flats and houses in Ballymun. The Ballymun housing project was completed on 19 December 1986. The scheme, which started in May 1965 and took nearly 4 years to complete, included 2,616 flats and 452 two storey buildings.

== History ==
A sod-cutting ceremony was performed in 1965 by Father Bernard Brady, and the foundation stone of the church was laid on the Feast of Christ the King in 1967. The church started construction in 1967 and was completed on 2 February 1969. It was built alongside a series of other churches to accommodate the people moving into the housing project. It was opened by then-Archbishop of Dublin, John Charles McQuaid, on 2 February 1969. It was originally in the Larkhill parish, before being moved to the Ballymun Road parish later in 1969. It is the only church in the Ballymun Road parish, and is the Parish Pastoral Centre of Ballymun Road. Mother Teresa visited on 4 June 1993.

== Architecture ==
It was designed by Richard Guy of Guy Moloney & Associates, made out of concrete from Clondalkin, Dublin. Its style was inspired by the Second Vatican Council, intended to cater it more to "modern life". Its axis of rotation is centered on one of its altars. It contains two "crying rooms" intended for young couples to hide crying infants inside of. Hearing aids are available, so elderly people can hear mass, with the building also being sound proofed to outside noise. Two side chapels connected to the main church building are used for funerals and weddings. Although funerals where human remains are present are held, it does not contain a morgue. In 2021, RTÉ compared it to a "landed spaceship with its antennae topped with a simple crucifix".
