= Thomas Houghton (architect) =

American architect

Thomas F. Houghton
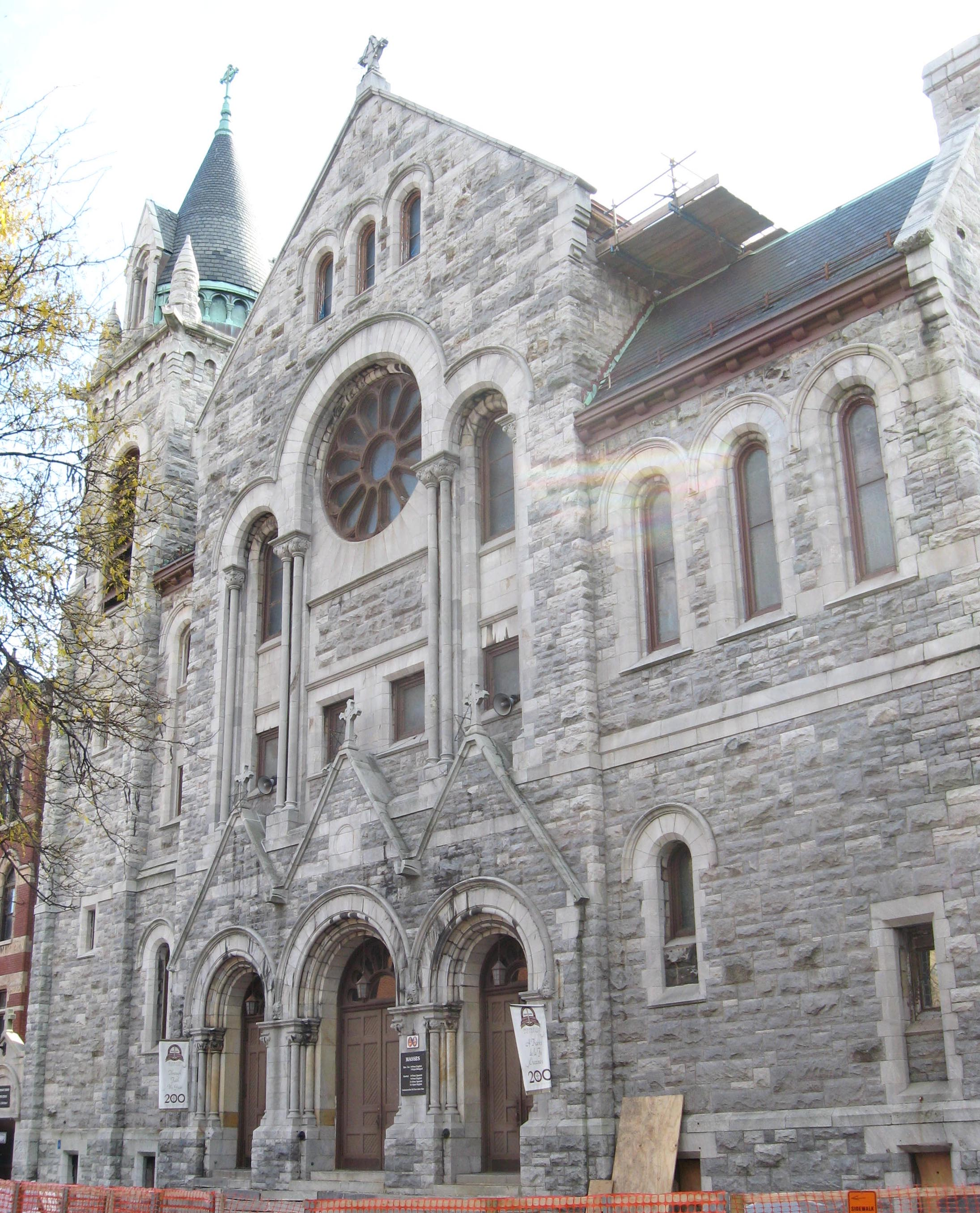
- Front Facade of Holy Rosary Church, East Harlem, New York City
- Born: 1842
- Died: 1913 (aged 70–71); Brooklyn, New York
- Known for: Thomas Houghton, Architect; Patrick Keely, architect

Thomas F. Houghton (1842 – December 6, 1913) was an Irish-born American architect who was for many years the chief draftsman for the firm of Patrick Keely.

== Early life and education ==
Houghton was born in Wexford, Ireland in May 1841, and emigrated with his family to Brooklyn in 1853. He was educated in the public schools there. He taught at St. Pauls' parish school before joining Patrick Keely's architectural firm in the 1850s as an apprentice carpenter. At that time Houghton lived at 57 Nelson Street in Brooklyn. In 1853, he worked on the Church of St. Mary Star of the Sea on Court Street. During the American Civil War he served as a paymaster for the United States Navy.

Around 1870, Thomas Houghton married Mary E. Keely, daughter of Patrick Keely; his sister Mary Houghton, married Keely's son William A. Keely. Thomas Houghton died at his house at 311 President Street on March 5, 1913, aged 72 years. He was buried at Holy Cross Cemetery, Brooklyn, Kings Co., NY.

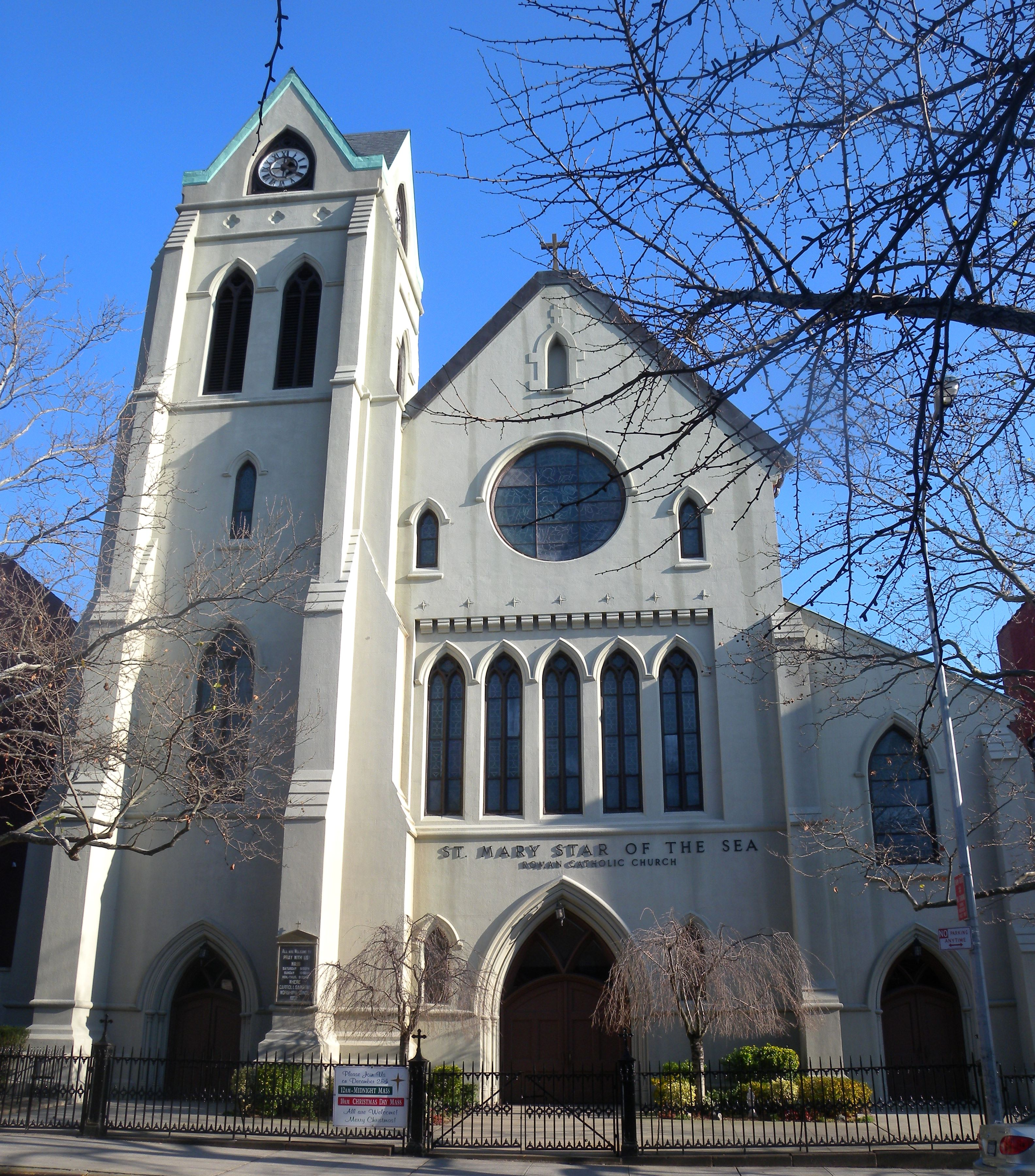
St Mary Star of the Sea, Brooklyn

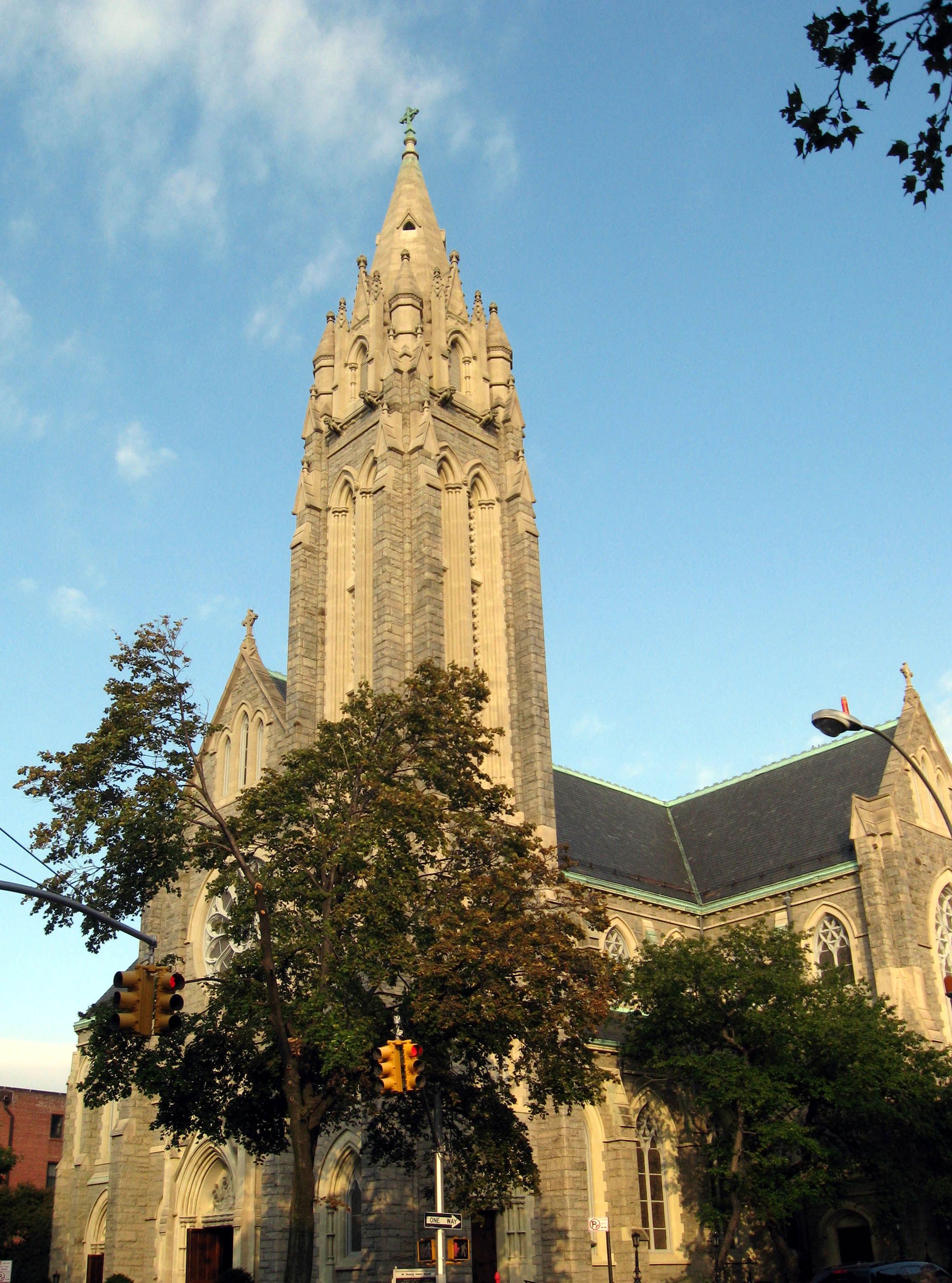
St Francis Xavier, Brooklyn

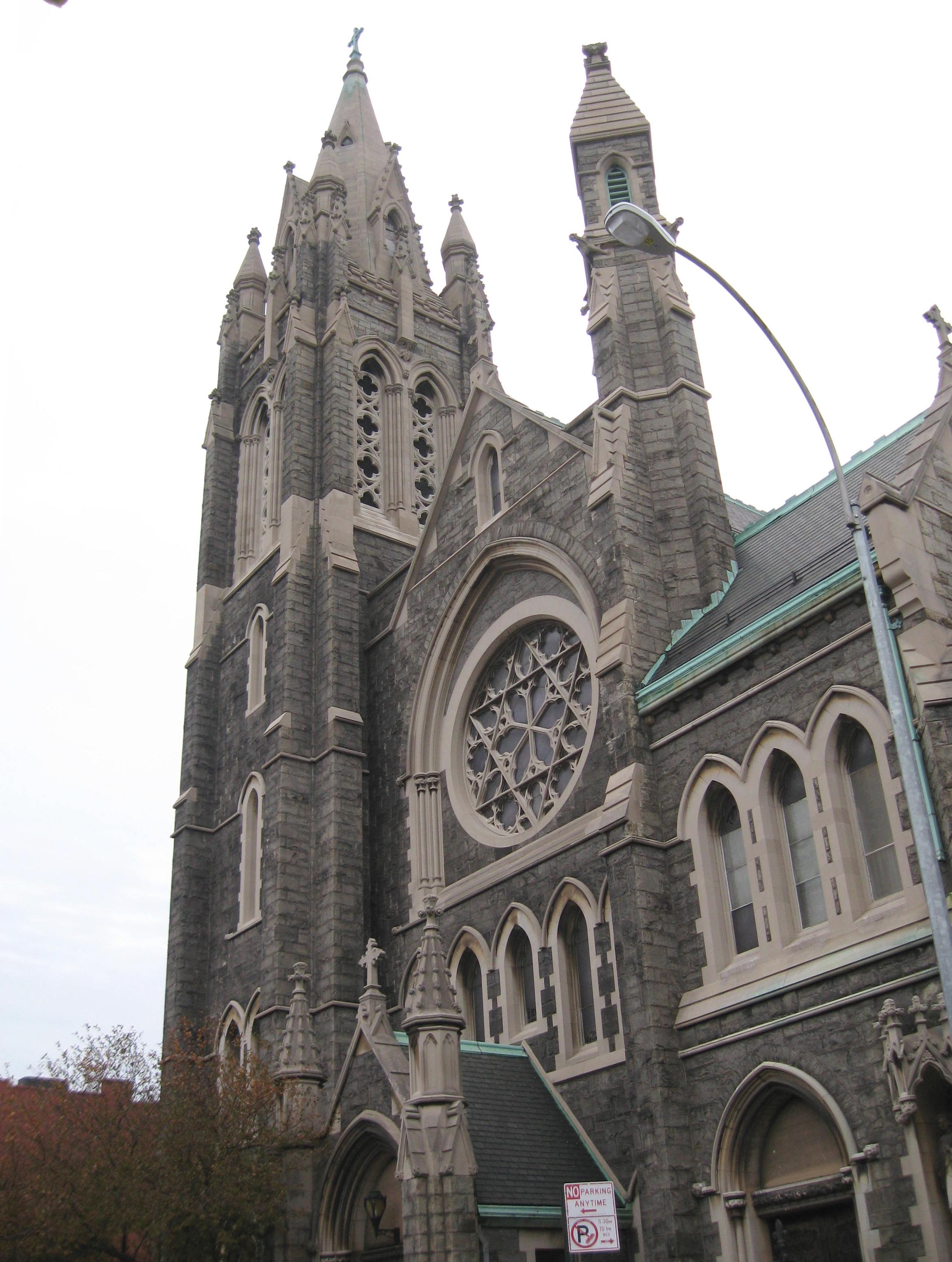
St Agnes, Brooklyn

== Architectural practice ==
After the war he entered the architectural firm of Patrick Keely. He rose to the position of main draftsman and in this capacity was involved in the design of churches, schools, convents and rectories for many Roman Catholic clients throughout the Eastern United States. Houghton also designed row houses in Stuyvesant Heights and elsewhere.

By the 1890s Keely and Houghton formed a partnership known as Keely and Houghton. Most of the buildings designed during that time are attributed to that firm. After Keely’s death in 1896, Houghton continued the practice under his own name.

== Works by Houghton ==
- Our Lady of Victory Church (Brooklyn, New York) (1891-1895), Throop Avenue and McDonough Street
- St. Agnes Church (Brooklyn, New York)
- St. Leonard's Academy, South 4th St. Brooklyn (1884)
- St. Francis Xavier Church (Brooklyn) (1904)
- Holy Family Chapel, Sisters of Charity of St. Elizabeth, Convent Station, New Jersey
- St. Mary of the Annunciation Church, Melrose, MA
- Holy Rosary Church, New York City
- St. James Church, Salem, MA
- St. Ann Church, Somerville, MA
- Our Lady of Mt. Carmel Church, New Bedford, Massachusetts
- St. Peter Church, Lowell, Massachusetts (with P. Keely)
