= Our Lady of Victory Church (Brooklyn) =

Coordinates: 40.68136°N 73.94028°W

Our Lady of Victory
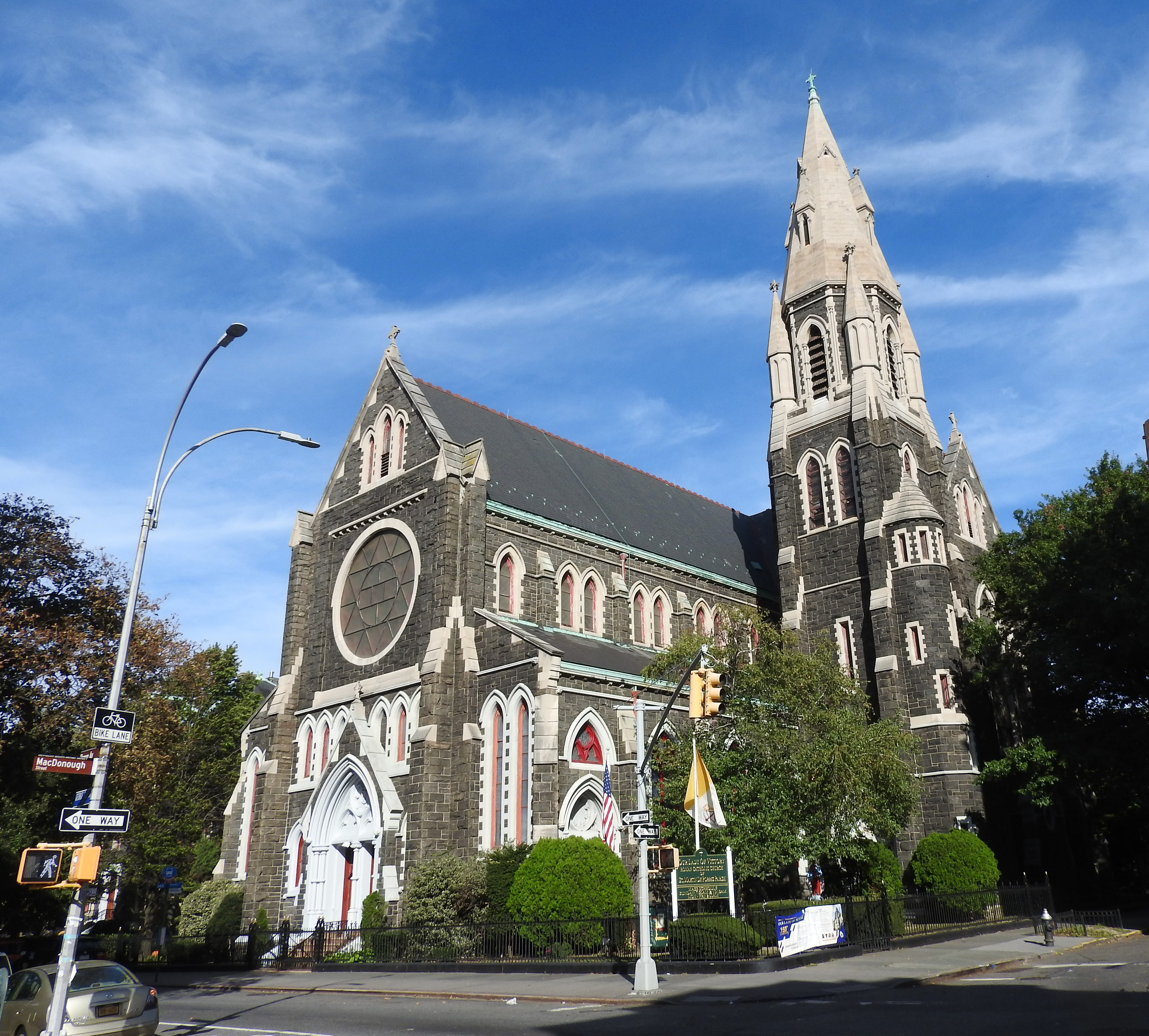
- Our Lady of Victory
- Location: Brooklyn, New York City, New York
- Denomination: Catholic Church
- Website: https://stmartindeporresparish.org/

Architecture
- Architect: Thomas F. Houghton
- Style: Gothic
- Completed: 1895

Clergy
- Pastor: Fr Alonzo Cox

The Church of Our Lady of Victory is a Black Catholic parish in the Diocese of Brooklyn, located at Throop Avenue and Macdonough Street in New York. The parish was established in 1868.

== History ==
The church was built between 1891 and 1895 to the designs of architect Thomas F. Houghton. OLOV is a classic Gothic style church, made of dark Manhattan schist trimmed with white limestone.

Due to a decrease in the population at nearby parishes, in 2011 Bishop Nicholas DiMarzio ordered for the church to be merged with Holy Rosary and St. Peter Claver, forming a new parish: St. Martin De Porres. The current pastor is Fr Alonzo Cox, at one point the youngest pastor in the diocese. In 2017-2018, the church marked its 150th anniversary.
